= List of My Little Pony comics issued by IDW Publishing =

This is a list of the tie-in comics to Hasbro's My Little Pony: Friendship Is Magic as issued by IDW Publishing. See My Little Pony (IDW Publishing) for more information.

In addition to monthly single issue releases, IDW has also published collected volumes covering the individual story arcs, multiple story arcs, or larger portions of the series.

== My Little Pony: Friendship Is Magic (November 2012–October 2021) ==
This is a list of My Little Pony: Friendship Is Magic issues.

No.	Title	United States release date	United States ISBN
01	My Little Pony: Friendship Is Magic - Volume 1	May 15, 2013	978-1613776056
The Return of Queen Chrysalis: Issue 1 (released November 28, 2012); Issue 2 (released January 2, 2013); Issue 3 (released February 6, 2013); Issue 4 (released March 6, 2013)
The Changeling Queen Chrysalis plans to exact revenge on Twilight Sparkle for her defeat by absorbing her magic. Twilight and her friends discover that changelings have captured and replaced the citizens of Ponyville, and are able to rescue all of them except the Cutie Mark Crusaders, whom Chrysalis has imprisoned in her kingdom. Chrysalis challenges the six friends to save the fillies in three days time. Unable to contact Princess Celestia, Twilight worries that the deadline coincides with the passing of the Secretariat Comet, which will amplify her magic. En route, Chrysalis uses her changelings to cause rifts between the six and separate them. The six overlook the fight and reach Chrysalis, who traps Twilight's friends with the fillies. Chrysalis decides to make Twilight her pupil instead of absorbing her magic, threatening to kill her friends if she does not accept. Twilight opts to save her friends and, empowered as the comet flies overhead, defeats Chrysalis and her minions with a powerful burst of magic, and traps them in her castle. Twilight and the freed ponies are rejoined outside by Princess Celestia and Spike, who have been battling a horde of giant cockatrices in Canterlot.: Katie Cook (story); Andy Price (art); Heather Breckel (coloring); Robbie Robbins (lettering, 1–2); Neil Uyetake (lettering, 3–4); Bobby Curnow (editor)
02	My Little Pony: Friendship Is Magic - Volume 2	October 16, 2013	978-1613777602
Nightmare Rarity: Issue 5 (released March 27, 2013); Issue 6 (released April 24, 2013); Issue 7 (released May 15, 2013); Issue 8 (released June 12, 2013)
Twilight Sparkle and her friends have been suffering from nightmares for a week, and decide to hold a slumber party together to figure out what is going on. During the night, Rarity is abducted by a dark miasma. The others learn from Princess Luna that Rarity has been taken by the same forces that transformed her into the evil Nightmare Moon to serve as their queen. Accompanied by Luna and Spike, the five friends venture into the forces' domain to rescue Rarity. When they arrive, they find that Rarity has been transformed into the nightmare forces' new queen, Nightmare Rarity, after being convinced that her friends care little for her. The friends are overwhelmed by the nightmare forces and locked up. Twilight urges Luna to return to Ponyville to prepare the citizens there. Spike manages to elude Nightmare Rarity as she departs for Ponyville with her forces, and rescues the others. Luna and the other citizens of Ponyville defend themselves against Nightmare Rarity, giving enough time for Twilight, Spike, and the others to arrive. Using the power of their friendship, the friends revert the corrupted nightmare creatures into docile moon creatures. They turn this and their thoughts of Rarity to Nightmare Rarity, and finally dispel the evil spirit. Luna and the moon creatures thank the ponies for their help before leaving, while Rarity is thankful for her friends' support.: Heather Nuhfer (writer); Amy Mebberson (art); Heather Breckel (coloring); Neil Uyetake (lettering); Bobby Curnow (editor)
03	My Little Pony: Friendship Is Magic - Volume 3	January 13, 2014	978-1613778548
Zen and the Art of Gazebo Repair: Issue 9 (released July 31, 2013) (SDCC variant: July 18, 2013); Issue 10 (released August 28, 2013); Neigh Anything: Issue 11 (released September 25, 2013); Issue 12 (released October 30, 2013)
Zen and the Art of Gazebo Repair: Big McIntosh embarks to the hardware store for nails to repair the farm's gazebo. He is waylaid by several of Ponyville's citizens as he goes through the Summer Wrap-Up fair, only to find that the hardware store is in ruins from the antics of the Cutie Mark Crusaders trying to build their own fireworks launcher. Big Mac returns to the fair to locate the hardware store owner, Lugnut, continuing to be waylaid by the other activities of the fair. Although Big Mac is flustered at having wasted the day, Zecora reminds him to think of the happy memories he had from the events. Big Mac eventually finds the store owner, who reports that Apple Bloom had taken all the nails on the farm for their launcher, and gives him the nails he needs as well as a promise for delivery of lumber the next day. Big Mac returns to the farm to find the gazebo in ruins from another errant launch from the Crusaders' launcher. However, in the concluding photos, the gazebo is repaired by Big Mac with the help of Lugnut and the Crusaders. Neigh Anything: Shining Armor and Princess Cadance relate the story of how they meet as high-school students at Canterlot Academy to Twilight Sparkle and her friends. Shining during school is a nerd who is stricken by Cadance's beauty and kindness and, with his other nerdy friends, vows to ask her to the upcoming dance before the top school's athlete Buck Withers can. Shining and his friends try to win Cadance over with a rock song, and then try to sabotage Buck during the championship polo match, but both plans backfire. Shining watches heartbroken when Buck asks Cadance to the dance. Cadance, who is also infatuated with Shining on the chance meeting, ditches Buck at the dance at the first chance she gets to catch up to Shining and affirm their shared love. Cadance and Buck are crowned the dance's Queen and King, but as Buck brags and openly humiliates Shining, Cadance, their friends, and the rest of the student body reveal how much of a bully he has been to them, and to cheers from the crowd, Buck is hoisted to the rafters while Shining and Cadance share their first dance and kiss.: Katie Cook (writer); Andy Price (art); Heather Breckel (coloring); Neil Uyetake (lettering); Bobby Curnow (editor)
	My Little Pony: Omnibus, Vol. 1	October 21, 2014	978-1631401404
Collection of Issues 1 through 12 of the comics.
04	My Little Pony: Friendship Is Magic - Volume 4	May 20, 2014	978-1613779606
Friendship Ahoy!: Issue 13 (released November 20, 2013); Issue 14 (released December 18, 2013); TBA: Issue 15 (released January 15, 2014); Issue 16 (released February 5, 2014)
Friendship Ahoy!: The six ponies go to the beach for a vacation, where Fluttershy reluctantly prepares to return a rescued fish named Gil to the ocean. A pirate ship soon washes ashore, its captain Hoofbeard disembarking in search of a crew to help him find a certain treasure. The ponies accept, with Fluttershy hoping to find Gil again after losing him in the waves, eventually reuniting with him. Over the course of the voyage, the ponies learn that Hoofbeard was mutinied upon by his original crew after becoming obsessed in his search for the "treasure", and grow increasingly suspicious of his intentions. Once he leads them to a windless portion of the seas, the ponies mutiny in an effort to return home. They are attacked en route by a pod of mermares, one of whom Fluttershy realizes is Hoofbeard's "treasure" named Jewel, while the others are trying to keep the two apart. Fluttershy convinces Hoofbeard and the mermares to make amends by returning Gil to the sea. Twilight casts a spell on Hoofbeard, giving him gills and fins to be with his beloved, and the mermares help the ponies return home. Issues 15-16: Twilight finds her books are being eaten by a magical bookworm, while the rest of Ponyville find strange pods around the town. Twilight, Pinkie Pie, Rainbow Dash, and Rarity magically enter the books to try to stop the bookworm and repair the damage but become sidetracked when they find themselves enacting various stories and over-embellish the original tales. Eventually, they are trapped in a white void, believing that the worm has completely eaten all their books. Meanwhile, in Ponyville, Applejack and Fluttershy find that the fictional characters from the books are emerging from the pods and plan to take over their world. Twilight and her friends realize they can create their own stories to lure the bookworm to them, while Applejack, Fluttershy, and Spike, trapped by the evil characters, send a message via a comic book to Twilight about their plight. Twilight shows the bookworm the damage its voracious eating has done to their friends, and the bookworm offers to help fix everything. Twilight, her friends and the bookworm return to Ponyville, and the bookworm's recollection of the stories returns the library to normal and wipes the fictional characters away.: Heather Nuhfer (story); Brenda Hickey (art, coloring); Heather Breckel (coloring); Neil Uyetake (lettering); Bobby Curnow (editor)
05	My Little Pony: Friendship Is Magic - Volume 5	September 16, 2014	978-1631401053
Reflections: Issue 17 (released March 19, 2014); Issue 18 (released April 30, 2014); Issue 19 (released May 28, 2014); Issue 20 (released June 25, 2014)
Twilight and her friends investigate Princess Celestia's week-long disappearance beyond a magic mirror created by Star Swirl the Bearded. The ponies learn through Star Swirl's notes that he and Celestia traveled to many different universes through the mirror until Celestia began recklessly using it to visit one particular world. Celestia returns from the mirror and explains that she has been visiting an alternate Equestria ruled by a benevolent King Sombra, whom she is in love with. She sends the Element bearers to this world to help Sombra defeat her and Luna's evil counterparts. When they fight the evil princesses, however, the six discover that Celestia's overuse of the portal causes any harm they inflict to the evil princesses to affect the good princesses as well. Eventually, their confrontation causes both worlds to begin merging entirely, bringing the good princesses to battle their counterparts. Celestia requests the others to seal herself and the evil Celestia by combining the Elements of Harmony with Sombra's crystal magic. Instead, Sombra sacrificially uses the Elements to absorb the evil of his world's princesses, restoring balance to both worlds. Everyone returns to their original worlds and the mirror is destroyed, with a single piece kept by Celestia in memory of Sombra.: Katie Cook (story); Andy Price (art); Heather Breckel (coloring); Neil Uyetake (lettering); Bobby Curnow (editor)
06	My Little Pony: Friendship Is Magic - Volume 6	January 20, 2015	978-1631402036
Manehattan Mysteries: Issue 21 (released July 16, 2014); Issue 22 (released August 13, 2014); TBA: Issue 23 (released September 3, 2014); Discord in Time: Issue 24 (released October 8, 2014)
Manehattan Mysteries: Applejack, Fluttershy, Rarity, Apple Bloom, and Babs Seed visit Manehattan to watch a magic show hosted by Trixie. The magician makes the prized Ostlerheimer Diamond disappear as part of her act, but when she fails to reproduce the diamond, the police accuse her of theft. Applejack and her friends become entangled in the crime when the diamond reappears in Applejack's hat, and they go on the run with Trixie, who explains her magic act had been a trap to lure out a diamond thief named Rough Diamond. The ponies set out to clear their names by catching the real thief at an art museum. They discover a clue to Rough Diamond's identity and her next target and sneak into the museum to trap her, only to find themselves caught by the police. Babs, who has taken a liking to Trixie due to similarly troubled pasts, realizes one of the officers is acting strangely. The group provides enough of a distraction to reveal the officer as Rough Diamond in disguise, having used her position in the police to frame Trixie for the theft. Trixie thanks Babs for her help, and she returns to the stage to finish off her performances. Issue 23: Angel Bunny wakes to find Fluttershy missing and the rest of her animals running wild in the cottage. Getting no help from them or the woodland creatures, he goes to Ponyville only to find it empty of ponies. Angel finds the pets owned by the rest of the Mane Six, and Winona follows Fluttershy's scent and leads the group to the town's dam. There they discover a water sprite, whose singing has hypnotized the ponies into doing its bidding to tear down the dam. In order to prevent Ponyville from being flooded, Angel organizes the pets to lead an attack on the sprite. Winona and a growth-enhanced Opalescence scatter the ponies so that Angel and Gummy - flown in by Owlowiscious and Tank - can distract the sprite long enough to break its spell on the ponies. The sprite apologizes, explaining that it was only trying to help weaker sprites reach the ocean. As the ponies start working to find a new way for the sprites to make their journey, the pets are grateful for having had the chance to work together. Discord in Time: As Fluttershy is getting ready to take the Cutie Mark Crusaders on an animal-watching field trip, a meteorite lands in her front yard. Discord emerges from it to visit her, but he has arrived one week ahead of their scheduled time. Tagging along with the group, he quickly becomes bored and offers to take them into Equestria's past so they can see much more exciting creatures. Their first stop is the civilization of Anugypt, very similar to ancient Egypt, whose ruler Anubis captures the group over an old grudge against Discord. They escape with the help of an army of cats, whose leader is a friend of Discord's, and flee through several other time periods before arriving in the prehistoric era. Here, a roc snatches up the Crusaders before Discord can react, and Fluttershy chastises him for always using his powers just to have fun, rather than to help others. Realizing his mistake, he calls in a favor from an animal friend of his in this time and saves the fillies. Discord understands that he still has much to learn about being a good friend and returns the group to the present day, first making sure that Fluttershy gets to see the beauty of the prehistoric creatures.: Ted Anderson (story) (Issues 21–22); Jeremy Whitley (story) (Issues 23–24); Agnes Garbowska (art, coloring) (Issues 21-22); Diana Leto (art, coloring) (Issue 21); Amy Mebberson (art, coloring) (Issue 23); Brenda Hickey (art) (Issue 24); Bill Forster (coloring) (Issues 21-22); Sara Richard (coloring) (Issue 23); Heather Breckel (coloring) (Issue 24); Bobby Curnow (editor) (Issues 21-24)
	My Little Pony: Omnibus, Vol. 2	October 1, 2015	978-1631404092
Collection of Issues 13 through 24 of the comics.
07	My Little Pony: Friendship is Magic - Volume 7	June 2, 2015	978-1631403248
The Good, the Bad and the Ponies: Issue 25 (released November 19, 2014); Issue 26 (released December 24, 2014); The Root of the Problem: Issue 27 (released January 28, 2015); Issue 28 (released March 18, 2015)
The Good, the Bad and the Ponies: The Mane 6 travel to Canter Creek, where Chili Pepper, one of AJ's relatives, lives and who has implored the Mane 6 to come up. They meet up with Sheriff Tumbleweed, who says that the town is being ravaged by Cattle Rustlers who want to gain control of the Peppers' ranch, and do this by intimidating the townsponies and make them give them their food; as such, ponies like Chili Pepper and others have already left town, figuring there's no hope. When the Cattle Rustlers, led by Longhorn, arrive after the Mane 6, AJ attempts to stand her ground only to be outpowered by Longhorn. They come up with a plan with the help of the other townsfolk, but before they can set it in motion, the Cattle Rustlers create a cow stampede that damages more of the town, and even more of the ponies flee, Sheriff Tumbleweed gives up hope and leaves his badge behind, which AJ takes up and promises to end the Cattle Rustler threat for good. The next day, after learning of AJ's persistence, Longhorn files official paperwork that as the owners of the ranch have abandoned it, the Cattle Rustlers are due to become rightful owners as long as they remain camped on the property for 7 days. Twilight deems the paper all legitimate and within Equestrian law, but AJ comes up with a plan to dupe the Cattle Rustlers, While Twilight and Fluttershy pose as town officials, noting small mistakes in the signing of the document, forcing Longhorn to leave camp to fix it, the others, along with help of some of the braver townsponies inspired by the Mane 6, distract the other, more dimwitted Rustlers long enough to move their entire camp piece by piece so that it's outside the ranch's property. On the last day, Longhorn and the other Rustlers find the Mane 6 rebuilding the barn, and believing they are still on the ranch property, proceed to destroy it. However, AJ points out that where they are is no longer on the ranch, and thanks to a few favors Twilight was able to pull with the Princesses, had gotten the barn marked as a historical landmark. Since the Rustlers now have committed a crime within Equestrian law, Twilight willingly steps in with her magic to reconstruct the barn as the town's new jail for the Rustlers. With the threat ended, AJ returns the sheriff's badge to Tumbleweed, who has been re-invigorated by the Mane 6. The Mane 6 ride off into the sunset. The Root of the Problem: When Ponyville is threatened by creatures and plants from the Everfree Forest, the Mane 6 enter it to find that the sentient deer, led by King Aspen and Prince Bramble, have taken to using the forest to take over Equestria. King Aspen points out how part of the forest is being razed by the minotaur business tycoon, Well-To-Do, for the construction of a theme park, and his activities have rendered the plants nearby unable to grow, and so they see their actions as taking back what is rightfully theirs. Twilight and her friends offer to try to negotiate with Well-To-Do, but the minotaur assets his activities are all within Equestrian law, if not morally suspect. One night, Bramble sneaks off to try to figure out what is going on, noticing that a smoothie mix used for the park has plant growth powers, but he is kidnapped by Well-To-Do. The minotaur forces King Aspen to agree to work for Well-To-Do as a park mascot to return Bramble, and Blackthorn, Aspen's second-in-command, decides it is time to fight back, and with help from Fluttershy convincing the creatures of Everfree and the other deer and ponies, they lay an attack on the construction site. Bramble sees more of the smoothie mix and directs their army to knock it over. The mix causes the forest to quickly grow back, ravaging the site, freeing Aspen, and quickly ending the battle. Well-To-Do asserts that he will be back with more equipment, and Aspen realizes that he cannot stop him, but the Everfree creatures might, upon which the minotaur is eaten by a hydra. With the situation resolved, the deer apologize to the ponies and offer to help restore Ponyville and other areas affected back to normal.: Katie Cook (story); Andy Price (art); Andy Price, Agnes Garbowska (art, coloring) (Issues 25–26); Andy Price, Tony Fleecs, Sara Richard (art, coloring) (Issues 27–28)
08	My Little Pony: Friendship is Magic - Volume 8	October 20, 2015	978-1631404467
Ponymania XXIX: Issue 29 (released March 25, 2015); Ponyville Days: Issue 30 (released May 20, 2015); Issue 31 (released June 10, 2015); Night of the Living Apples: Issue 32 (released July 22, 2015); Issue 33 (released August 19, 2015)
Ponymania XXIX: Cheerilee and the Mane Six visit Manehattan to watch Cheerilee's twin sister, Cherry Blossom, compete in a wrestling tournament. The two have not seen each other for years, and Cheerilee is nervous about seeing Cherry again. At a welcoming tea party organized by Rarity, the sisters get into an argument and Cheerilee storms out; Cherry follows, but trips and injures her leg severely enough to leave her unable to wrestle in the championship match against her rival, Iron Hock. However, since Cherry wears a mask in the ring, she realizes that Cheerilee could take her place for the match. Cherry and fellow wrestler Cloverleaf train Cheerilee, and Rarity boosts Cheerilee's confidence by pointing out that both sisters strive to cheer up children in their own ways. Cheerilee defeats Iron Hock to win the championship, then wins a surprise tag team match with a masked Rarity as her partner. Cheerilee and Cherry reconcile, and Cloverleaf reveals herself as Iron Hock, having played a role in the plan to bring the two back together. Ponyville Days: As Twilight takes an overnight trip to Canterlot on royal business, the Ponyville residents gather to prepare for the annual Ponyville Days festival celebrating the founding of the town. Mayor Mare announces that a commemorative plaque will be placed at the site of the town's first structure and that the youngest filly in that family will be crowned Ponyville Days Princess. An argument quickly springs up between Applejack and Filthy Rich over which family should receive the honors. Granny Smith had cultivated the unique Zap Apple strain at Sweet Apple Acres, but Filthy's grandfather had opened a shop to sell the fruit, causing the new settlement to prosper. Since the Carousel Boutique now stands on the site of that first shop, Rarity takes Filthy's side; the town quickly splits into two factions, with Applejack's faction threatening to secede from Ponyville. By the time Twilight returns from her trip, the argument has deteriorated into a melee of flying pies and pioneer outfits. She had spent her time in Canterlot raising interest in the festival but is now ready to cancel it due to all the strife. However, a crowd of tourists is already on its way to Ponyville, leaving her at a loss as to what to do. She decides to visit her friends and other leading citizens individually, persuading them to each focus on one aspect of the festival and work separately from one another. The sheer size of the crowd quickly overwhelms the town, throwing all the events into chaos, and Twilight begs everypony to help each other out as best they can so that the visitors will be happy. The advice works, and even Applejack and Rarity put their differences aside and turn Sweet Apple Acres into a campground for the visitors, using Rarity's unsold pioneer outfits to make tents. As the festival draws to a close, Twilight presents a plaque to each of them - one to mark Ponyville's first residence at Sweet Apple Acres, the other for its first commercial building at what is now the Carousel Boutique. Night of the Living Apples: After Celestia banished Nightmare Moon from Equestria, the latter sent debris from their battle into space in a fit of rage, vowing to return. In the present day, the debris, now tainted by Nightmare's magic, lands at Sweet Apple Acres and affects the apples there, making them sentient. When Applejack goes outside to investigate, she is attacked by them. The next day, the rest of the Mane 6, Spike, and the Cutie Mark Crusaders discover what has happened and are quickly captured despite their attempts to escape. The apples prove impervious to magic and easily conquer Ponyville; not even Luna can stop them. The Apples soon make plans to conquer all of Equestria, starting with Appleoosa. In hiding from the apples, Twilight temporarily turns Pinkie Pie into an apple to infiltrate Sweet Apple Acres and rescue a captured Spike. Pinkie also discovers an apple prisoner, named Good Apple, who does not share his fellow apples' desire for conquest. Pinkie is forced to leave both Spike and Good Apple behind after her cover is blown. Upon learning of this, Applejack wonders if the vampire fruit bats could be of any help, but Fluttershy expresses doubt of being able to communicate with them. Fortunately, Twilight has a solution. Using hypnosis, Twilight reawakens the thirst for apples Fluttershy gained during the period she was a pony/vampire fruit bat hybrid within her, causing her to transform back into Flutterbat. However, as she is still unstable, they secure Flutterbat under the watchful eyes of the Cutie Mark Crusaders, and Twilight uses a spell to transform herself and the other Mane 6 into vampire bat ponies, with more control of their sense. They fly off and begin to fight against the apples, freeing Spike and Good Apple. They learn that while they might be able to get rid of the meteor, that will not stop the sentient apples. While they are gone, Flutterbat, still struggling to keep control of her Fluttershy self, manages to break her bonds. As the other Mane 6 struggle against the mass of apples, Flutterbat arrives, having successfully contacted the vampire fruit bats, and they begin sucking the apples dry. With the tide turning against them, the lead apple has the others form a giant Spike-like monster to destroy Ponyville, Twilight, Pinkie and Spike let the others tackle the monster while they seek out the meteor. Twilight senses the magic from Celestia and Luna's battle centuries ago and uses some of it to super-charge Spike's fire breath, which he uses to power Pinkie's party cannon to launch the meteor into the depths of space. Meanwhile, as the giant apple monster ravages Ponyville, Rainbow Dash manages to put on a burst of speed to crash through the monster, replacing the bad apple leader that powers the apples with Good Apple. Good Apple is able to convince the others to stop attacking, and the situation is quickly resolved. With Celestia and Luna's help, the apples are relocated to a remote part of Equestria to allow them to develop their own society hidden away from other beings. Good Apple insists that the bad apple leader come with them, and Celestia reflects that everyone can have a bad side but it is knowing how to overcome that is what makes a pony a better being. Issue 29: Ted Anderson (story); Jay Fosgitt (art); Jay Fosgitt, Kathryn Longua (art, coloring); Ponyville Days: Christina Rice (story); Agnes Garbowska (art); Paul Abtruse (cover artist); Night of the Living Apples: Thom Zahler (story); Tony Fleecs (art, cover artist)
09	My Little Pony: Friendship Is Magic - Volume 9	March 22, 2016	978-1631405563
Siege of the Crystal Empire: Issue 34 (released September 16, 2015); Issue 35 (released October 21, 2015); Issue 36 (released November 18, 2015); Issue 37 (released December 16, 2015)
A cloaked pony starts showing up in Equestria, convincing the Flim-Flam Brothers, Iron Will, Lightning Dust, Queen Chrysalis, and the Changelings to stand by her in exchange for things they want the most. Meanwhile, the Mane 6 have been assigned to help in the preparation for the next Crystal Faire. One by one, the villains sneak in and distract them; Lightning Dust gets Rainbow Dash and Fluttershy to chase after her while the Flim-Flam Brothers and Changeling army distract Applejack and Twilight once again faces Chrysalis. Iron Will tries to make off with the heart, but he gets shot by a party cannon courtesy of Pinkie Pie and Rarity and crashes into Chrysalis, defeating her as Applejack manages to tie up the Flim-Flam Brothers. Rainbow and Fluttershy manage to catch Lightning Dust and all the villains are imprisoned. When Shining Armor investigates Iron Will's bag, he finds it to be empty and Chrysalis admits to the whole scuffle being a diversion. Meanwhile, the cloaked figure makes her way down to King Sombra's study, where she is revealed to be Radiant Hope, Sombra's best friend from their childhood. Discovering Sombra's horn on the ground and that his essence still lives within it, she casts a spell that restores him to his original form. Radiant Hope's history is then more fully detailed, including how she left Canterlot after the Crystal Empire's disappearance and entered into an alliance with Sombra's people, the Umbrum or shadow ponies. With the Crystal Heart in Hope's possession, Sombra launches an attack to retake the empire, freeing the villains to aid him. Princesses Celestia and Luna then arrive in response to Cadance's summons and engage Sombra and Chrysalis, but Hope acts to prevent them from harming Sombra, allowing him to turn them into stone. Upon discovering that Sombra intends to release the umbrum hidden away centuries before, Chrysalis flees with her Changelings after Sombra retreats to his study, while Lightning Dust, Iron Will, and the Flim-Flam Brothers begin to realize that they may have been in over their heads. Before leaving, Chrysalis inadvertently frees Twilight, whose magical abilities are restored by the inert magic of friendship from Shining Armor, Spike, and the rest of the Mane 6. Meanwhile, Cadance confronts Hope and she takes her to the umbrum's home, where Cadence's love magic reveals them to be the monsters they really are; the umbrum having deceived Hope into serving them. Cadence and Hope manage to escape and end up in Sombra's study, where the Mane 6, Spike, and Shining Armor arrive to confront him. Hope, still believing there to be good inside of Sombra, takes a magic blast from Twilight to save Sombra and is knocked out. Enraged, Sombra opens a secret door in the study and unleashes the umbrum at long last. With the umbrum, Sombra finally retakes the Empire, capturing Twilight, Cadance, and Shining Armor while the rest of the heroes escape. After Shining Armor is turned to stone, Sombra visits a recovering Hope, who resents him for his decisions. As Twilight and Cadance are about to be turned to stone in the dais where the Crystal Heart once stood, the rest of the Mane 6 return with reinforcements which include Derpy, Discord, and the Cutie Mark Crusaders. Realizing that Hope will never be happy with him so long as he remains with the umbrum, Sombra reactivates the Crystal Heart (hidden in Hope's saddlebag since the beginning of the story) and uses it to banish the umbrum back to their homeland. Without the presence of their dark magic, Celestia, Luna, and Shining are freed from their stone imprisonment. As Sombra is about to be killed by the Crystal Heart's energies, the princesses turn him into a unicorn so he can be with Hope. Sombra apologizes for everything he's done and he and Hope leave to find the pieces of Princess Amore, the former ruler of the Crystal Empire, who was turned into a crystal statue back when Sombra originally became ruler of the Crystal Empire, hoping to restore her so Sombra can make amends with her.: Jeremy Whitley (story); Andy Price (art); Sara Richard, Andy Price (cover artist)
	My Little Pony: Omnibus, Vol. 3	June 21, 2016	978-1631406294
Collection of Issues 25 through 37 of the comics.
10	My Little Pony: Friendship Is Magic - Volume 10	August 16, 2016	978-1631406881
Don’t You Forget About Us: Issue 38 (released January 13, 2016); Issue 39 (released February 10, 2016); TBA: Issue 40 (released March 16, 2016); Rainbow Dash and the Very Bad Day: Issue 41 (released April 13, 2016); A Pinkie Pie Story That Pinkie Pie Kinda Sorta Remembers: Issue 42 (released May 11, 2016)
Don't You Forget About Us: Cheerilee, along with Applejack and Rarity, lead the students on a wilderness hike. The Cutie Mark Crusaders, Diamond Tiara, Silver Spoon, Snips, and Snails wander away from the main group and find themselves lost. The conflict between the Crusaders and Diamond Tiara prove no luck to find their way back, and then they are further chased off the main path when a bear finds them. After the group takes shelter and waits for the bear to leave, they try to figure out how to get back. Unfortunately, Sweetie Belle, Snips, and Snails' magic is too weak to send off a signal flare, and Scootaloo is unable to fly high enough to get a lay of the land. Apple Bloom leads the Crusaders to climb higher; Snips and Snails follow, not wanting to be around Diamond Tiara. When Silver Spoon decides to go with the others, Diamond Tiara eventually relents and races to catch up with the others. She trips and falls over a cliff-face, hanging for her life off a tree branch. The others all try to rescue her, and Apple Bloom ends up falling over the edge as well, handing onto Diamond Tiara. After pulling them back up, the group takes shelter in a cave for the night where the CMC start to find some understanding with the others. Diamond Tiara and Silver Spoon claim that because they come from the richest families in Ponyville, they have to keep up their appearances, while Snips and Snails complain that they are not as stupid as everyone thinks they are. The next morning, Apple Bloom and Diamond Tiara see a rare and legendary bird fly past them and moments later, Twilight, Rainbow Dash, Fluttershy, Bulk Biceps, and the Wonderbolts arrive and rescue the full group, bringing them back to Ponyville where they are welcomed with open arms. Issue 40: Twilight tells the Mane 6 how she first met Spike. On her first day as a student at Princess Celestia's School for Gifted Unicorns, she was introduced to the same baby dragon she had hatched during her entrance exam. Celestia asked Twilight to take care of him when she is unable to, which soon proves to be a difficult task. Taking care of the baby resulted in a bad shift in Twilight's grades and making her feel overly stressed. Things came to a head when the dragon disrupted an open house banquet. Twilight took the dragon back to their room and after venting out her frustrations in a rant, the dragon began talking to her and Twilight ended up bonding with him over it. Twilight's parents came to check on her and Twilight decided to name the dragon "Spike" due to his attempts at saying "Smarty Pants", the name of Twilight's doll. Rainbow Dash and the Very Bad Day: Rainbow Dash eagerly wakes up one day, excited for the next Daring Do book to be released. But on her way to the book's opening in Ponyville with Tank, she runs into a wall of cloud bricks, which gets her angry with the construction worker on duty. Her newly acquired bad mood soon spreads all around Ponyville and even to Shining Armor, his old group of high school friends, and the Royal Sisters. Zecora, the only one unaffected by everyone's bad mood, urges Tank to try and snap Rainbow out of it. This results in Rainbow yelling at Tank and making him cry. Seeing Tank cry snaps Rainbow out of it and she apologizes to him and her friends for her bad mood. Soon, everyone starts apologizing to each other, erasing their bad moods, and the Mane 6 hold a book reading party in the park. A Pinkie Pie Story That Pinkie Pie Kinda Sorta Remembers: Pinkie asks Rarity to help her write a children's book as a gift to someone, the book itself being a parody of The Emperor's New Clothes. They both set to work, but their conflicting ideas for how to make the story from the art style to how it originally was written begin to irritate Rarity. They are eventually able to finish the book and much to Rarity's shock, Pinkie reveals that it was for her as a way of celebrating the day they met. Rarity is touched by the thought and gladly accepts, though Pinkie admits she may have had more fun making it. Don't You Forget About Us: Christina Rice (story); Agnes Garbowska, Sara Richard, Mary Bellam, Diana Leto, Lea Hernandez (art, cover artist); Issue 40: Ted Anderson (story); Brenda Hickey, Sara Richard, Jennifer Myer (art, cover artist); Rainbow Dash and the Very Bad Day/A Pinkie Pie Story That Pinkie Pie Kinda Sorta Remembers: Katie Cook (story); Andy Price (art)
11	My Little Pony: Friendship Is Magic - Volume 11	January 10, 2017	978-1631408151
Ponies of Dark Water: Issue 43 (released June 15, 2016); Issue 44 (released July 27, 2016); Issue 45 (released August 31, 2016); Election: Issue 46 (released September 28, 2016); Issue 47 (released October 19, 2016)
Ponies of Dark Water: After saving a country from Ursas, the Mane 6 discover a series of springs that has erupted from the ground and decide to reward themselves by spending time in the water. The next day, Twilight suddenly begins draining the IQ of the Ponyville citizens to make herself stronger and smarter. The following day, Spike and the Cutie Mark Crusaders discover that all of the Mane 6 are acting strangely; Applejack is acting like a mean-spirited business magnate, Twilight declares herself empress of Ponyville, Rainbow Dash keeps flying around creating Sonic Rainbooms, and Rarity plans to usurp Twilight as ruler of Ponyville. The group reasons that the water in the springs turned them into darker versions of themselves. Celestia gets word of what has happened and sends Luna in to help Spike and the CMC investigate the situation. She arrives in time to help them as Applejack is terrorizing them, but when Luna tries to sap the dark magic out of her, it fails and she runs off. Spike and Luna head into Ponyville to find the rest of the Mane 6 while the CMC head into the Everfree Forest to find Zecora, but run into an army of animals led by Fluttershy. They're chased to Zecora's hut, where they tell her what's happening and escape as Fluttershy and her animals close in on them. Luna finds Rarity and a fight ensues that spills into the theater where Pinkie Pie, dressed as a clown, is holding several citizens hostage. Rarity leaves to depose Twilight as "Empress of Ponyville" as Pinkie wrecks the theater with her party cannon (now using actual ammunition) and Zecora and the CMC arrive. Learning that Spike was also exposed to the water, but is strangely unaffected, Zecora decides to examine him while Pinkie collects water from the springs and starts throwing it in balloons at the Ponyville citizens, turning them evil as well. Unfortunately, one of the balloons hits Luna, transforming her back into Nightmare Moon. Using Spike's scales, Zecora manages to create an antidote for the water, and they, along with the CMC, use it to turn Pinkie Pie, Applejack, and Rainbow Dash back to normal. Using the antidote, Rainbow creates a storm that turns the townspeople, Fluttershy, and her animals affected by the evil water back to normal, including Luna. She tricks Rarity into drinking the water, but Twilight, having absorbed all the intelligence in Ponyville, sees through the deception and reveals Luna has already been cured by the storm and she predicted the whole situation. So Pinkie Pie uses the element of surprise on Twilight and manages to cure her with the antidote. Twilight returns all the IQ she stole from Ponyville's citizens and the Mane 6 set to work repairing the damage they caused. Visiting the springs, Zecora determines that years of exposure to Equestrian magic have tainted it, so she casts a spell that turns it to normal. Luna then takes her leave, commenting that had the Mane 6 been united after being tainted by the water, they would have been purely unstoppable. Election: The playground Mayor Mare opened is destroyed by an earthquake. After many complaints from Ponyville, Filthy Rich decides to run for mayor, promising to make some changes when he's elected. The Mane Six (joined by Starlight Glimmer) realized they have not had an election in years, and decide it's right to finally have one. Twilight decides to help Mayor Mare and Rarity decides to help Filthy Rich but both decline. At the debate, it's also revealed that Cheerilee, Time Turner and Lyra Heartstrings decided to run for mayor too. Unfortunately, their method of improving ponies live's were not all that inspiring. In the end, Filthy Rich is elected as mayor, but things don't go well for Ponyville. More earthquakes are happening, Fluttershy's cottage is full of noise from nearby construction workers, taxes are raised, and the new playground falls apart. The Mane six try to go to Ms. Mare for help but she says she's retired. At a town meeting, a stressed out Filthy Rich is pummeled by tomatoes. Ms. Mare comes and tells everypony what it really takes to be a mayor. Suddenly, a Tatzlwurm appears, revealing itself to be the cause of the earthquakes. Ms. Mare develops a plan use noise vibrations to get rid of it. She then helps Filthy Rich with his resigning papers so she can be mayor again. Ponies of Dark Water: Thom Zahler (story); Tony Fleecs (art); Tony Fleecs, Diana Leto, Sara Richard, Andy Price (cover artists); Election: Ted Anderson (story); Agnes Garbowska (story art and main cover), Sara Richard (secondary cover), Caitlyn "Pixel Prism" Vilbrandt (retailer incentive cover)
	My Little Pony: Treasury Edition: Ponies of Darkwater	November 1, 2017	—
Collection of Issues 43 through 45 of the "Ponies of Darkwater" Arc in an oversized treasury.
12	My Little Pony: Friendship Is Magic - Volume 12	June 13, 2017	978-1631409035
Chaos Theory: Issue 48 (released November 9, 2016); Issue 49 (released December 21, 2016); Issue 50 (released February 1, 2017); From the Shadows: Issue 51 (released February 22, 2017); Issue 52 (released March 22, 2017); Issue 53 (released May 3, 2017)
Chaos Theory: The Mane 6 and Starlight Glimmer go stargazing on the night of a rare astrological event called the Cosmic Convergence Conjunction. At first, Discord appears and tries to tag along and make himself the center of attention, but leaves after Applejack tells him off. After the Conjunction begins, Starlight notices a weird glow and the group finds that Discord has transformed into an unusual-looking egg. The egg is taken back to the castle where it hatches while Twilight examines it. Discord emerges wearing a fancy suit and a monocle and bearing combed hair and a moustache. He explains that he was affected by the Conjunction and now is a being of pure order; Twilight promptly dubs him "Accord" after he disowns his original name. The Mane 6 (with the exception of Fluttershy) immediately take to Accord, deciding to put him to good use helping Ponyville. Asked by Mayor Mare to finish the construction of a hotel that two architects are fighting over, Accord uses his magic to make them agree, which disturbs Starlight as the action reminds her of her past villainy. The next day, the Mane 6, Spike, Accord, and Starlight are invited to a dinner with Celestia and Luna, during which Starlight calls out Accord's actions from the previous day, telling him that he cannot force others to agree. Accord disagrees, telling them that while he cannot make every pony the same, he can use his magic to make them think the same way. He then uses his magic to brainwash all the Canterlot Castle servants and declares his intent on turning Equestria into a land of pure order. While Starlight, Celestia, and the rest of the Mane 6 set about evacuating Canterlot as Accord's magic begins to affect the city's citizens, Twilight and Luna enter Accord's mind to find it nothing like Discord's; it is devoid of color and organized like a stereotypical office. Twilight discovers the true Discord in a snow globe and learns that Discord becoming Accord had nothing to do with the Conjunction; he transformed himself into Accord voluntarily, feeling that the Mane 6 didn't appreciate his chaotic nature. All three of them are then overrun by the Accord clones running amok inside Accord's mind. Starlight's group soon finds that Accord doesn't just aim to turn all of Equestria into a land of pure order by brainwashing other ponies, but rather he's turning them into him. As the group heads to the train station to evacuate the citizens unaffected by Accord's magic, Luna and Twilight arrive, both under Accord's control. With Twilight and Luna under Accord's control, Celestia, Starlight Glimmer, and the rest of the Mane Six flee on the train to Ponyville. While on the train, Starlight tries to lift Celestia's spirits by reminding her about the "Reflections" incident and the recent "Dark Water" incident. Returning to Ponyville, they find that it has yet to be taken over and Celestia orders Spike to retrieve the Elements of Harmony from the Tree of Harmony. Accord soon arrives after learning teleportation magic. When hoping that she can still bond with the element of magic, Celestia puts it on, but since the Elements of Harmony make order when there's none, and Accord is a creature of pure order, he spreads his magic to the Mane Six and Celestia. With Starlight being the only pony left uncontrolled, she tries to convince Accord by playing a game that of if there is a good reason that Accord has controlled them, that Starlight joins him by choice. But Starlight convinces him that he has no friends and that friendship isn't order, so Accord agrees to become Discord again, and they all celebrate the 50th issue of My Little Pony: Friendship Is Magic. The story is followed by a ten-page short story about Discord giving Celestia a day as a normal pony by turning her into a pegasus. From the Shadows: After returning from a film with her friends, Twilight Sparkle and Spike return to her castle to find a strange unicorn stallion rifling through her books. Before she can stop him, the unicorn teleports away with three books. As her friends help her to reshelve the books, Twilight finds that three of the books are seemingly ordinary books about Equestria's history. The Mane Six have their doubts as to his intentions, so decide to track them down. Using an enchanted map, the Mane Six and Spike travel to another town before the path of the stallion disappears. The group splits up to try to find info. From the various townsponies, they find that the stallion is Shadow Lock, a unicorn with the ability to erase the text from books and make anyone that had read those books forget what was in them, and now is headed for the town's library. The group race there, disrupting Shadow Lock as he pursues more books. In response, he uses his magic to bring to life monsters from the various books. Shadow Lock explains to Twilight that there is an ancient evil from Equestria's past so dangerous that it cannot be spoken of. Ergo, he is trying to erase its memory from present-day existence. After Shadow Lock flees, Twilight manages to send the monsters back into the books they came from. The Mane 6 decide to split up and protect various places that Shadow Lock could strike next: the Ponyville schoolhouse, a Canterlot newspaper, and a Colonial Whinniesburg re-enactment. Shadow Lock strikes all but the re-enactment, erasing the history articles in each other location. Twilight later explains that Spike has prepared a backup plan: luring Shadow Lock to the Canterlot Museum where a History of Equestria exhibit is on display. Twilight leads him into a trap in the archives and acknowledging that Shadow Lock doesn't want to hurt anyone, she offers him a truce, unaware that Shadow Lock has imprisoned Spike and the rest of the Mane 6 in different eras in the past based on the museum exhibits. Confronted, Shadow Lock admits that about a year prior he discovered that he was related to a villain from a thousand years in Equestria's past. Not wanting to have that known, he studied magic that would allow him to erase that name (and any memories associated with it) from books around Equestria to avoid having to face that past. Meanwhile, the rest of the Mane 6 and Spike figure out that Shadow Lock's magic has stuck them in short, repeating time loops based on the museum exhibits, and find ways to escape the magic. They join Twilight and Shadow Lock as he is revealing his faults, and they give him the idea from when they were trapped that if he doesn't face his history, he will be doomed to repeat it. Shadow Lock admits the error of his ways and promises to try to research his ancestor, in case that should ever come to pass. As the ponies start to return home, Twilight reveals that Shadow Lock never shared with her the name of this villain. Chaos Theory: Ted Anderson (story); Andy Price (art); Jeremy Whitley (short story); Jay Fosgitt (short story); From the Shadows: James Asmus (writer); Tony Fleecs (artist)
	My Little Pony: Omnibus, Vol. 4	March 13, 2018	978-1684051410
Collection of Issues 38 through 50 of the comics.
13	My Little Pony: Friendship Is Magic - Volume 13	December 26, 2017	978-1684050291
Angel's Big Day: Issue 54 (released May 24, 2017); Wings Over Yakyakistan: Issue 55 (released June 21, 2017); Issue 56 (released July 12, 2017); Apinkalypse Now: Issue 57 (released August 9, 2017); The Vines That Bind: Issue 58 (released September 13, 2017)
Angel's Big Day: Taking place at the same time as the season 7 episode Fluttershy Leans In, Fluttershy has Angel Bunny look after some animals while she and her friends take part in building the animal sanctuary. Unable to keep them under control at first, Angel recruits the rest of the Mane 6's pets and the CMC to help him. At first, they all try to control the animals as one group, but the effort proves unsuccessful. Angel eventually gets the idea to have everyone split up into groups, which has much more success. When she returns from building the sanctuary, Fluttershy congratulates Angel on a job well done, only for Angel to discover that he will have to put up with the animals for a few more days. Wings Over Yakyakistan: Since Pinkie became an honorary yak in Not Asking for Trouble, Prince Rutherford has become more interested in learning about other cultures. After the Wonderbolts perform a stunt show for the yaks, the dragons begin attacking Yakyakistan. Taking cover in a nearby cave, Spitfire shows reluctance to fight back, but Rainbow and her parents use a story about Rainbow's first flight competition to inspire her to be brave. With renewed confidence, Spitfire leads the Wonderbolts, Rainbow, and Pinkie in aiding the yaks against the dragons. However, even with the rest of the Mane 6, Spike, and Starlight showing up as reinforcements, the yaks are outnumbered, forcing everyone to retreat. Spike expresses confusion over the situation; he thought that with Ember now leading the dragons as Dragon Lord, the dragons would become kinder. However, much to everyone's shock, they discover that Ember herself is leading the invasion. As it turns out, Ember is angry with the Yaks for breaking a "sacred bond" between them, but she refuses to reveal what that is. With everyone else not willing to talk to the dragons about it due to the dragons having a mostly bad reputation among ponies, Spike goes to Ember and convinces her to tell him what the sacred bond is. As it turns out, long ago, the dragons and yaks fought over the land which would become Yakyakistan, causing damage to it. Eventually, yak Prince Ulysses and Dragon Lord Scintilla made an agreement and Ulysses helped Scintilla find what became the Dragon Lands, while he took the land which became Yakyakistan. In return, Ulysses made Scintilla an honorary yak. Now that Pinkie Pie is an honorary yak, Ember feels that this bond has been violated. The next day, Spike manages to stop the two sides from fighting and calls out the ponies for making generalizations about the dragons, the dragons for reinforcing that view by attacking Yakyakistan, and the yaks for breaking the sacred bond. Prince Rutherford admits that he didn't understand the ancient scroll recounting Ulysses and Scintilla's conflict because of the lousy artwork. Apologies are made and the dragons help to rebuild Yakyakistan. Pinkie offer to give up her honorary yak title, but Ember lets her keep it, commenting that it's time to let go of the past and look to the future. Apinkalypse Now: Following the episode "Discordant Harmony", Fluttershy takes Discord to visit her animal sanctuary. Unknown to either of them, Pinkie chases Gummy through the portal to Discord's realm and begins to enjoy herself. Eventually, the dimension begins to change to suit Pinkie's style. Back in Equestria, Discord finds that he isn't able to use his powers, so Fluttershy takes him to Twilight and Starlight for help. Twilight and Starlight eventually get the idea to open the portal to Discord's realm by using Discord himself as a conduit and learn about what's happened to Pinkie. Twilight rounds up the rest of the Mane 6 and with Discord, they head into Discord's realm with Starlight acting as an anchor so they can get back. They find that in Discord's absence, the Chaos Dimension locked onto Pinkie's creativity and mischief, explaining why everything is so different. They eventually find Pinkie and learn that she's gone mad with power as a result of her taking over the Chaos Dimension. Pinkie turns herself into an alicorn and prepares to turn Equestria into a land of eternal partying. Realizing that Pinkie's not strong enough to keep her chaos powers outside of the Chaos Dimension, Discord challengers her to a "Cuckoo Cook-Off", where the two conjure up random things to fight each other with and the first one to run out of ideas loses. Discord ultimately wins and Pinkie goes back to normal before Discord sends them all home. The Vines That Bind: Following the episode "A Health of Information", Twilight, Fluttershy, Zecora, and Cattail discover a series of love notes between Mage Meadowbrook and a pony named Aqua Vine, written around the time where Mage was looking for a flower called the Magenta Bloom, which can possibly cure almost any ailment. They head to Fillydelphia, where Aqua Vine lived, to deliver the notes to the Fillydelphia Hall of Records and learned that a descendant of Aqua's runs a local greenhouse. The descendant reveals Aqua was looking for the Magenta Bloom along with Mage but did it through research instead of directly trying to look for it like Mage did. Now the descendant has started to narrow down where it is and that it will be in bloom within the next couple of weeks. During the search, Cattail is asked about his family history and he tells a story about how Mage cured an entire town of a plague. They eventually make it to where the flower is located: the Coastal Cliffs, where fierce winds prevent Twilight from flying up to retrieve it. Fluttershy and Zecora start to note that Twilight is heavily fixated on the possibilities that the Magenta Bloom could bring, with Fluttershy suggesting that Twilight might want to leave something lasting the way Mage did. Mage was obsessed with finding the Bloom, as well, but she never found it prior to her disappearance. Once the group reaches the top of the cliffs where the pollen and salt blown from the waters are worse, Twilight falls off and is unable to see. After the group pulls her back up, Twilight berates herself for her foolishness, but the others assure her that she has something Mage didn't: friends to help her. The next morning, the group makes a more coordinated attempt to reach the flower and Twilight manages to grab it off the cliffs. As they head back home, Fluttershy assures Twilight that she only had the best of intentions at heart for finding the Bloom and that she can always count on her friends. Angel's Big Day: Rob Anderson (story); Jay Fosgitt (art); Wings Over Yakyakistan: Christina Rice (story); Agnes Garbowska (art); Apinkalypse Now: Thom Zahler (story); Tony Fleecs (art), Sara Richard (variant cover); The Vines That Bind: Thom Zahler (story); Agnes Garbowska (art)
14	My Little Pony: Friendship is Magic - Volume 14	June 5, 2018	978-1684052462
Pie in the Sky: Issue 59 (released October 4, 2017); The Stars on Our Ponies: Issue 60 (released November 8, 2017); Convocation of the Creatures!: Issue 61 (released December 6, 2017); Issue 62 (released January 31, 2018); All in Marederation: Issue 63 (released February 21, 2018)
Pie in the Sky: Following the events of the episode "Secrets and Pies," Pinkie Pie comes to believe that Rainbow Dash's dislike of pie stems from the fact that she has yet to find one that she actually likes. Pinkie bakes hundreds of pies and makes Rainbow Dash sample one after the other, trying to find a recipe she likes, but Rainbow Dash eventually gets fed up and storms off. After talking with Twilight Sparkle, she decides to turn the tables by making Pinkie do things that are boring to her: watching Rainbow Dash practice flying drills, re-reading old Daring Do novels she has already read, and "chillaxing" quietly in the sun. Pinkie eventually realizes that just because two ponies might like different things, neither should try to force their own preferences on the other. She gives away all the spare pies and offers a chocolate cake to Rainbow Dash, who happily accepts it as an apology. The Stars on Our Ponies: The Cutie Mark Crusaders prepare for the first overnight camp-out they've planned for the Cutie Mark Day Camp they opened in "Marks and Recreation". Rarity informs the fillies that Fancy Pants is bringing his niece, Gilded Lily, to the camp, which Rarity sees as an opportunity for the CMC to expand their client base and make business in Canterlot. During the camp, the CMC take notice of Lily's lack of enthusiasm in outdoor activities. They figure that Fancy Pants is putting a lot of pressure on her to represent her family in Canterlot. During a stargazing activity, Lily helps the CMC in pointing out several constellations, resulting in her getting her cutie mark. Lily is horrified by this and privately explains to Scootaloo her fear that her cutie mark will not help her represent Canterlot's social elite as Fancy Pants wishes. When Scootaloo argues that she should learn to do things for herself, Lily points out who Scootaloo always defers to what Apple Bloom and Sweetie Belle want to do. The following day, Scootaloo tells her friends that she wants to start a new branch of the CMC dedicated to extreme sports. When Apple Bloom and Sweetie Belle think she's leaving the CMC, Scootaloo explains that while she loves being a crusader, it doesn't mean that they have to do the same things together all the time. Later, the CMC help Lily talk to Fancy Pants about her cutie mark, but Fancy Pants assures Lily that her mark will help make her influential in her own way. Weeks later, the CMC are invited to a fundraiser at the Canterlot Observatory hosted by Lily and Fancy Pants, while Scootaloo prepares for the first Extreme Sports Cutie Mark Camp, accompanied by her fellow crusaders. Convocation of the Creatures!: Princesses Twilight, Celestia and Cadance, and Celestia's aide Raven attend the Convocation of the Creatures, a gathering of delegates from Equestria and the neighboring lands. As the Convocation begins, Raven and the aides to the other species' leaders go to work updating the extensive document archives in the library of the meeting hall, choosing to ignore what they see as a boring political summit. Twilight, however, enjoys the cultural events and persuades the archivists to take a break from their work and join the festivities. The archivists do enjoy themselves, but one of them has found an ancient treaty stating that a large portion of what is now Equestria (including the site of Canterlot) had once belonged to the griffons. Since Equestria apparently never paid for the land under the terms of the treaty, it is technically griffon territory again. With the Equestrian delegation at a loss as to what to do, griffon delegate Goldstone offers two choices: Equestria can either cede the land to Griffonstone and relocate all the ponies who reside there, or pay the agreed-upon sum plus interest – a total that would bankrupt the government. Celestia agrees to return the land, but asks for a brief delay so that Twilight, Raven, and the other archivists can search the files in hopes of finding an alternative. They discover an addendum to the treaty stating that Equestria did indeed pay the griffons for the land, but Goldstone – eager to increase his personal land holdings by forcing Equestria to cede the territory – tries to seize and destroy it. They escape past him and his guards, passing the document among themselves and using the events of the Convocation as distractions, and Raven brings the document to Celestia and the chief griffon delegate just in time. With the crisis resolved and Goldstone arrested on charges of treason, the Equestrian delegation returns home; Raven promises to keep in touch with the other archivists and decides to leave the adventuring to Twilight and her friends. All in Marederation: A party at Sugarcube Corner is broken up by the arrival of a group calling itself the Anti-Sugar League. Their leader, Temperance Flowerdew, proclaims that sugar is a danger to public health and public morals and wants to ban all sweets. The movement begins to gain ground in Ponyville, with boycotts and protests cropping up all over town; sales at Sugarcube Corner plunge, and Sweet Apple Acres is also affected because Applejack sells her pies in Ponyville. Pinkie Pie tries to throw Temperance a party to change her attitude, but Temperance convinces her that her parties have added to the problem by making ponies sick. Twilight Sparkle receives a letter that leads her to a secret speakeasy at Sweet Apple Acres, where ponies are now gorging themselves on sweets. Returning to town, she is shocked to find that Pinkie has joined the Anti-Sugar League. Pinkie explains that Temperance grew up in a home where sugar was forbidden; she gave in to temptation one day and ate herself sick, and ever since then she has crusaded to ban sugar as bad for ponies' health. Twilight shows Temperance the unhappy ponies around town who have either over-indulged or gone without sugar, and tells her that health is a matter of happiness as well as nutrition. Temperance dissolves the Anti-Sugar League, now understanding the importance of moderation, and enjoys some of the treats at the party Pinkie throws for her. Pie in the Sky/The Stars on Our Ponies: Christina Rice (story); Agnes Garbowska (art, cover); Heather Breckel (colors); Convocation of the Creatures!: Ted Anderson (story); Andy Price (art); Heather Breckel (colors); Andy Price, Diana Leto, Sara Richard (covers); All in Marederation: Christina Rice (story); Brenda Hickey (art); Heather Breckel (colors); Brenda Hickey, Sara Richard, Jen Vaughn (covers)
15	My Little Pony: Friendship Is Magic - Volume 15	November 6, 2018	978-1684053575
Everything Old: Issue 64 (released March 21, 2018); Queen for One Less Day: Issue 65 (released April 18, 2018); Applewood Follies: Issue 66 (released May 16, 2018); Tempest's Tale: Issue 67 (released July 4, 2018); Issue 68 (released July 25, 2018)
Everything Old: Joining Fluttershy on a trip to Manehattan where her friend is attending an animal shelter seminar, Rarity discovers with horror that fashions have cycled back through to what was popular in her early designer days, something she finds repulsive. As Rarity despairs over feeling forced to follow the trend she hates, Fluttershy finds her own difficulties at the seminar when she learns about aspects of running a shelter she was ignorant of. The two eventually meet up with Rarity's friend Coco Pommel, and as the two from Ponyville share their concerns Rarity is inspired. With help from her friends, she recreates her old designs using the experience she has now accumulated, with Fluttershy serving as a model. Rarity then returns the favor by encouraging Fluttershy to share her own new ideas with other shelter owners about supporting new projects. With that encouragement, Fluttershy proposes new programs at the seminar to encourage newcomers into the field and finds the attendees are most impressed and receptive to her ideas. Queen for One Less Day: In preparation for her annual trip around Equestria, Princess Celestia dons a magical amulet that allows her to transform herself into a Pegasus so she can go about unrecognized. After a number of stops, she arrives in Ponyville, only for her amulet to be stolen by a filly named Scarlet Petal, leaving Celestia trapped in her powerless Pegasus form. Scarlet takes the amulet to her "aunt" Shadowfall, who employs both Scarlet and her brother Winter Comet as thieves, only to discover the amulet's properties; she then flees Shadowfall after being ordered to surrender the amulet. Celestia goes to Twilight for help, and after convincing her of her identity they set off to find Scarlet before the amulet's changeling magic corrupts her. In an ensuing confrontation with Shadowfall, Scarlet realizes that her guardian was just using her and her brother and returns the amulet to Celestia. With her true form and powers restored, Celestia arrests Shadowfall and takes in the youngsters, and decides to travel Equestria in her true form from now on before destroying the amulet. Applewood Follies: Rarity informs her friends at the Castle of Friendship that a movie is being made based on their Friendship Journal and arranges for them to attend the premiere, though Twilight is unable to attend due to running the School of Friendship. Wormer Horsehooves, the film's director, is frustrated in his efforts to make the film seem true to the events described in the journal, and asks Rarity and the others if they will help to direct it. However, Rarity's recollections of various events clash with those of the others, and in the end, the five each decide to direct their own film. The end result is a horrendous hodgepodge that is received as a comedy by the audience. Tempest's Tale: Some time after My Little Pony: The Movie, Tempest Shadow bids farewell to Twilight Sparkle in Ponyville and sets out to find a place for herself. After traveling across Equestria, receiving mixed receptions from its inhabitants and doing her best to offer help where she can, Tempest takes the suggestion of a new acquaintance and travels to the Crystal Empire. Following an awkward meeting with Princess Cadance, Tempest agrees to help the arctic patrol with a series of disturbances on the Empire's borders. Her assigned partner proves to be Glitter Drops, one of the two childhood friends who were with her when her horn was broken. While Glitter is ecstatic to see Tempest, Tempest is less enthusiastic; the tension between them continues to build until Tempest accuses Glitter of abandoning her. Discovering a trail that seems to lead to the perpetrator of the recent troubles, Tempest pursues it on her own only to run into an Ursa Minor, the same type of creature that broke her horn. Confronted with the Ursa, Tempest finds herself unable to move, but Glitter Drops quickly acts to scare the creature away. Enraged to be saved by the pony she feels abandoned her, she nearly attacks Glitter Drops, who then tearfully admits to having carried the guilt for Tempest's broken horn for years. Tempest apologizes for her own anger, and the two rekindle their friendship as they trail the Ursa, which they discover has been separated from its mother, an Ursa Major. Glitter Drops is able to use her magic to lure the Ursa home, but admits to Tempest that both she and their other friend Spring Rain struggled at Princess Celestia's magic school and that she eventually dropped out. Tempest then returns to Princess Cadance, whom she realizes intended for her to reunite with her old friend, and thanks her. Everything Old: Thom Zahler (story); Andy Price (art); Heather Breckel (colors); Andy Price, Diana Leto, Sara Richard (covers); Queen For One Less Day: Thom Zahler (story); Andy Price (art); Heather Breckel (colors); Applewood Follies: Ted Anderson (story); Tony Flecs (art); Heather Breckel (colors); Tempest's Tale: Jeremy Whitley (story); Andy Price (art); Heather Breckel (colors)
16	My Little Pony: Friendship Is Magic - Volume 16	April 9, 2019	978-1684054282
Magical Apple: Issue 69 (released August 8, 2018); Extreme Bingo: Issue 70 (released September 5, 2018); Happy Haunts: Issue 71 (released October 3, 2018); Pie in the Sky: Issue 72 (released November 7, 2018); Copycats: Issue 73 (released December 19, 2018)
Magical Apple: After experiencing disappointment that her parties cannot last forever, Pinkie Pie eats the legendary Golden Apple from Sweet Apple Acres. Infused with its magical powers, she begins granting ponies' wishes around Ponyville in hopes of making them happy, but ends up causing chaos instead. Twilight and the others attempt to convince her of the error of her ways, and eventually succeed after Pinkie starts to recognize the consequences of her powers. After organizing an effort to put out a fire caused by her actions, Pinkie wishes for her powers to disappear, which also undoes all the wishes she made. She then throws a party to apologize to her friends for all the chaos. Extreme Bingo: The Golden Horseshoe Gals (featured in the Season 8 episode "Grannies Gone Wild") invite Rainbow Dash to a game night, which proves to be a bingo game that Applejack has been hosting for years. Seeing how bored everypony is, Rainbow invents a variant called "Extreme Bingo," hiding the number balls all over Ponyville for the Gals to find so they can fill out their cards. The Gals have fun searching for the balls, over Applejack's objections, but Rainbow begins to realize that some of her hiding places were a little too extreme. The last few balls are hidden in the Castle of the Two Sisters, and as a storm moves in, Applejack insists that they need to end the game for their own safety. However, Granny Smith sneaks away to keep playing; when she falls from a crumbling staircase, Rainbow flies in to save her. Rainbow and Applejack apologize to the Gals, respectively for not thinking of their safety and for not treating them as grown mares capable of deciding how to spend their time, and the group decides to plan smaller adventures in the future. Happy Haunts Pie in the Sky: Following the events of the episode "The Perfect Pear," Applejack comes across an apple pie recipe devised by her mother, Pear Butter (a.k.a. Buttercup) while cleaning out the attic with Apple Bloom and Granny Smith. Granny says it was the best pie she ever had, and Applejack recruits Pinkie Pie to help her re-create the recipe even though they are puzzled about the last ingredient being listed simply as "love." When their first attempt falls short of Granny's recollection, Mrs. Cake suggests that Applejack get her ingredients from the same sources Buttercup used. These merchants share their fond memories of Buttercup and her husband, Bright Mac, with Applejack and her siblings. After the next attempt also comes up short, Applejack mulls over the stories and figures out the last ingredient. She successfully re-creates the pie for Granny, but keeps Buttercup's final touch a secret: a pear mixed in with the apples, symbolizing her love for both the Apple and Pear sides of her family. Copycats: A mysterious amulet winds up in Fluttershy's animal sanctuary and she unknowingly steps on it. Soon enough, she begins to act like the animals she comes into contact with, soon attracting the attention of her friends and all of Ponyville. Realizing that she's being affected by magic, Twilight goes to the library with Spike for research, while Applejack, Pinkie, and Rainbow head to Fluttershy's cottage, where they find Zephyr Breeze and tell him what is happening. They find a timberwolf with a broken paw at the sanctuary and find that it's acting like Fluttershy. Furthermore, they deduce that Fluttershy is now acting like a timberwolf and head into town to find her. There, they stop her from attacking Apple Bloom and Sweetie Belle and give chase. Twilight deduces that Fluttershy is being affected by the Animalulet, a long-lost relic created by Star Swirl the Bearded and she and Spike ask Rarity to help find it. Applejack, Rainbow, and Pinkie corral Fluttershy back to the sanctuary just as Rarity finds the gem. Twilight notes that the only way to free Fluttershy from the amulet's influence is to destroy it, but doesn't know-how. Spike then eats the gem, causing Fluttershy and the animals she swapped traits with to return to normal, although Spike temporarily starts acting like random animals as a side effect caused by the amulet. One week later, Fluttershy releases the timberwolf into the wild back to its family, commenting that the experience gave her more insight into caring for her animals, but she wouldn't want to do it again. Magical Apple: Paul Allor (writer); Toni Kuusiste (art); Heather Breckel (colors); Extreme Bingo: Jeremy Whitley (writer); Toni Kuusiste (art); Heather Breckel (colors); Happy Haunts: Ted Anderson (writer); Andy Price (art); Heather Breckel (colors); Pie in the Sky: Thom Zahler (writer); Agnes Garbowska (art); Heather Breckel (colors); Copycats: Thom Zahler (writer); Toni Kuusiste (art); Heather Breckel (colors)
17	My Little Pony: Friendship Is Magic - Volume 17	September 3, 2019	978-1684055265
Coiffure Confidence: Issue 74 (released January 23, 2019); Cosmos: Issue 75 (released March 5, 2019); Issue 76 (released March 20, 2019); Issue 77 (released May 1, 2019); Issue 78 (released May 29, 2019)
Coiffure Confidence: One day, Yona, Silverstream, and Sandbar are having a bad hair day, so Fluttershy takes them to Zephyr Breeze for some mane therapy. After Zephyr fixes their hair up, he expresses worry that he is unqualified for his job. To help him with his stress, Fluttershy takes him to a mane styling conference, bringing along Sandbar, Silverstream, and Yona so they can observe friendships in a professional environment. There, Zephyr meets Pixie Cut, a long-time mane stylist who encourages Zephyr not to judge himself so harshly. Zephyr manages to cheer up at first, but then panics when Silverstream signs him up to put on a mane styling demonstration. As he tries to calm himself down again, Pixie goes onstage to demonstrate a mane style on Yona, which earns her high praise of judges. When Zephyr goes backstage to congratulate her, he sees her having a panic attack. Pixie admits her calm demeanor on stage was a front to hide her fear of speaking in front of large crowds, despite her experience, but she goes out anyway because if she lets her fear rule her, she'll never succeed. Inspired, Zephyr goes through with the demonstration and receives praise from the judges for his work, one of whom tells Zephyr that he has a bright future ahead of him. Issue 75: Centuries ago, Discord and another draconequus named Cosmos created chaos together. When Cosmos began to show an obsessive love for him and take her love for chaos too far, Discord turned to the Royal Sisters, Queen Novo, King Aspen, and the King of Abyssinia to help banish her from Equestria and then erases their memory of her existence. In the present day, Rarity finds a mysterious necklace with a purple star on it and gives it to Twilight. After she puts it on, Twilight begins to hear a voice telling her to "find the rest". Later, the necklace projects an image to the Mane 6 and Spike of a heart-shaped constellation called the Andalusian, an arrangement of stars that appeared and disappeared centuries ago. Twilight realizes that her necklace is one of the six stars that made up the constellation and the others fell to Equestria years ago. She becomes obsessed with finding the rest of the stars and the Mane 6 decide to recruit some of their friends to help find them. Unknown to all, however, Cosmos is possessing Twilight through the necklace, and she plans to gather the stars together so she can regain her true form and be with Discord again. To find the remaining stars, scattered in different locations in and out of Equestria, the group splits up. Pinkie and Big Mac head to Klugetown, Rainbow, Rarity, and Spike to the Crystal Empire, Zecora and the Cutie Mark Crusaders to Griffonstone, Fluttershy to the Everfree Forest, and Applejack and Twilight to Canterlot. At Canterlot, Twilight ignores Applejack's suggestion at telling Celestia and Luna about what they're doing and heads to a secret underground chamber housing several forbidden artifacts, one of which is the second Andalusian star. Applejack soon realizes that Twilight is being controlled and with her cover blown, Cosmos attacks and fights Applejack, eventually locking her inside a cage made from Earth using Twilight's magic. Meanwhile, Fluttershy tells Discord about the quest and Discord informs Fluttershy about who Cosmos is and that the Andalusian stars fell back to Equestria because a shooting star knocked them out of the sky. Discord found one of the stars and buried it to ensure Cosmos would never come back. Fluttershy convinces Discord to dig up the star he found and take it to Celestia, since he knows more about Cosmos than anyone else. However, once they get to Canterlot, Discord and Fluttershy find that not only is Twilight being possessed by Cosmos, but so is Celestia. Cosmos then steals the third star and uses it to possess Luna, speaking through all three princesses at once. Cosmos wishes to reunite with Discord and keep causing chaos, but upon learning that Discord has been reformed, Cosmos turns Fluttershy into a pony/butterfly hybrid to distract Discord and keep him from warning the others. Discord escapes with Fluttershy while Cosmos waits for the remaining three stars to be found. Issue 76: In a flashback, Cosmos, while spreading chaos across Equestria with Discord, set a school full of foals and fillies on fire. Discord rescued them, which earned him Cosmos' wrath. It was this incident that compelled Discord to turn to Celestia, Luna, and the other rulers to help him banish Cosmos. In present-day Klugetown, Pinkie and Big Mac meet up with Capper and retrieve the fourth Andalusian star after Pinkie drags Big Mac through a local tournament. In Griffonstone, Zecora and the CMC find the fifth star, but Zecora begins to suspect that something is not right about their mission. When both groups return to Canterlot, the Cosmos-controlled princesses are waiting for them. In the ensuing struggle, Capper is turned into a kitten, and he and the CMC are imprisoned in the same cell as Applejack. Cosmos then uses the two stars the two groups found to possess Big Mac and Zecora. Almost back at full strength, Cosmos decides to go after the final star herself. Issue 77: In the chaos dimension, Discord tells Fluttershy how he first met Cosmos. More than a thousand years ago, Cosmos fell out of the sky and landed in front of Discord. The two quickly bonded over their shared love for chaos and wreaked havoc across Equestria, with Discord keeping the princesses busy with illusions so that they wouldn't interfere. Over time, however, Discord came to realize that Cosmos was too chaotic even for his liking and helped the royal sisters banish her back to the stars. Fearing that someone may want to use her power, Discord erased everyone's memory of Cosmos and took the fall for her actions, which eventually resulted in his imprisonment. Although she understands why Discord now fears Cosmos, Fluttershy nevertheless convinces him that they have to go back and help their friends, to which Discord reluctantly agrees. When they return, they find Canterlot castle transformed by Cosmos' magic and Applejack, Pinkie, and the CMC imprisoned. After freeing them, they head off to the Crystal Empire, where Rarity, Spike, and Rainbow have teamed up with Cadance to find the final star - they are still unaware of what is happening. They find the star in a market, but as soon as Cadance touches it, she becomes possessed by Cosmos. Cosmos arrives moments later and merges together with the four princesses, Big Mac, and Zecora into a more powerful form. Discord, Fluttershy, Applejack, Pinkie, and the CMC arrive quickly afterward and Cosmos expresses delight in seeing Discord again. Issue 78: As Cosmos rampages across the Crystal Empire searching for Discord, he and the ponies reason that the only way that Cosmos can be defeated is by removing the Andalusian stars from her. They decide to have Spike eat the stars since they don't seem to affect him like they did the princesses. Pinkie Pie takes control of the attack plan as Cosmos finds them. Over the course of the battle, the ponies succeed in removing all but one of the stars, but the ponies are incapacitated by Cosmos one by one until only Discord, Fluttershy, and Spike are left. Cosmos insists that Discord could never hurt her, but Discord reveals that he intentionally sold her out to Celestia and Luna because he was afraid of her. Realizing how much Discord has changed, Cosmos turns Fluttershy into a statue and Spike a dog before revealing that she is not just a lover of chaos, but the very embodiment of malice. Discord manages to seize the final star and feeds it to Spike, depowering Cosmos and freeing those who were controlled by her. Discord banishes Cosmos to the moon and everything Cosmos affected with her magic turns back to normal. Later, Celestia and Luna award Discord and his friends for their efforts, while Twilight tries to interview everyone about their latest adventure. Coiffure Confidence: Ted Anderson (writer); Kate Sherron (art); Heather Breckel (colors); Cosmos: Katie Cook, Andy Price (co-writers); Andy Price (art); Heather Breckel (colors)
18	My Little Pony: Friendship Is Magic - Volume 18	February 2020	978-1684056156
The Ponyville Anniversary Spectacular: Issue 79 (July 3, 2019); Live-Action Role Pony: Issue 80 (July 24, 2019); Pretty Fly: Issue 81 (August 28, 2019); Dog-Dog-Dogged Determination: Issue 82 (September 18, 2019); The Strange Case of Silver Blaze: Issue 83 (October 16, 2019)
The Ponyville Anniversary Spectacular: As Ponyville prepares for an anniversary celebration of the town's founding, Twilight organizes a surprise party for Mayor Mare. While Apple Bloom is assigned to keep the mayor distracted by asking her to help with a school project, Twilight works with Cranky Doodle Donkey to choose to perform acts for the celebration. Much to Twilight's frustration, however, Cranky rejects all those who audition except for Big Mac's wood carving, which Twilight does not agree with. However, as Mayor Mare returns, Sunset Shimmer appears with two other ponies and they put on a rock performance that amazes everyone, including Cranky. As Sunset pulls a disappearing act, Mayor Mare thanks everyone for the surprise and the party commences in full. Live-Action Role Pony Pretty Fly: Rainbow Dash has invited Rumble and Scootaloo to attend Foals and Friends Weekend at the Wonderbolts Academy. During a rehearsal for an aerial parade, Rumble suffers a midair collision and ends up in the infirmary with a sprained wing. Scootaloo volunteers to keep him company since she cannot fly, and the two sneak into the campus museum to pass the time. They are surprised to find a statue of an earth pony wearing a Wonderbolt flight suit, and an officer enters the museum to tell them about Wind Sock, the only earth pony ever to join the team. Hired as a janitor, Wind Sock endured mockery from the pegasi as he worked on designing a machine to let him fly. When one Wonderbolt, Dauntless, became stranded at the bottom of a canyon filled with winds too strong for any pegasus to navigate, Wind Sock built a glider that allowed him to reach Dauntless and airlift him out. Wind Sock was officially inducted into the Wonderbolts for his ingenuity and bravery. The officer telling the story turns out to be Dauntless himself, now a general; he explains that some of Wind Sock's inventions are still being used and that his determination can serve as an example. Inspired by the account, Scootaloo and Rumble build a replica of the glider so Rumble can fly in the parade. Dog-Dog-Dogged Determination The Strange Case of Silver Blaze The Ponyville Anniversary Spectacular: Sam Maggs (author); Toni Kuusisto (artist); Heather Breckel (colors); Live-Action Role Pony: Sam Maggs (author); Kate Sherron (artist); Pretty Fly: Thom Zahler (author); Nicoletta Baldari (artist); Dog-Dog-Dogged Determination: Kate Sherron (writer); Toni Kuusisto (artist); The Strange Case of Silver Blaze: Thom Zahler (writer); Kate Sherron (artist)
19	My Little Pony: Friendship Is Magic - Volume 19	August 2020	978-1684056859
I'm So Excited: Issue 84 (November 13, 2019); No Fear!... Except One: Issue 85 (January 8, 2020); And Then There's Maud: Issue 86 (January 22, 2020); The Fast and the Furriest: Issue 87 (February 26, 2020); Issue 88 (March 25, 2020)
I'm So Excited: Christina Rice (writer); Toni Kuusiste (art); Heather Breckel (colors); No Fear!... Except One: Mary Kenney (writer); Casey W. Coller (art); Marissa Louise (colors); And Then There's Maud: Jeremy Whitley (writer); Kate Sherron (art); Heather Breckel (colors); The Fast and the Furriest: Ted Anderson (writer); Tony Fleeces (art); Heather Breckel (colors)
20	My Little Pony: Friendship is Magic Season 10, Vol. 1	June 1, 2021	978-1684057870
Season 10, Episodes 1-5: Issue 89 (August 12, 2020); Issue 90 (September 30, 2020); Issue 91 (November 18, 2020); Issue 92 (December 30, 2020); Issue 93 (January 6, 2021)
The Farasian Shores: Jeremy Whitley (writer); Andy Price (art); Heather Breckel (colors); Day at the Museum: Mary Kenney (writer); Trish Forstner (art); Heather Breckel (colors)
21	My Little Pony: Friendship is Magic Season 10, Vol. 2	October 2021	978-1684058457
Season 10, Episodes 6-9: Issue 94 (January 27, 2021); Issue 95 (February 17, 2021); Issue 96 (April 14, 2021); Issue 97 (May 19, 2021); Note: "My Little Pony Annual 2021" (April 28, 2021), described in more detail in the "One-shots" section below, is also part of the Season 10 storyline and is included between issues 95 and 96 in the trade paperback release of this volume.
Something There That Wasn't There Before: Thom Zahler (writer); Toni Kuusisto (art); Heather Breckel (colors); Abyssinians: Jeremy Whitley (writer); Tony Fleecs (art)
22	My Little Pony: Friendship is Magic Season 10, Vol. 3	TBD	978-1684058761
Season 10, Episodes 10-14: Issue 98 (June 2, 2021); Issue 99 (June 30, 2021); Issue 100 (July 14, 2021); Issue 101 (August 11, 2021); Issue 102 (October 13, 2021)
Issues 98: Celeste Bronfman (writer); Akeem S. Roberts (art); Issues 100: Jeremy Whitley (writer); Andy Price (art); Issues 101: Jeremy Whitley (writer); Toni Kuusisto (art); Issues 102: Jeremy Whitley (writer); Andy Price (art)

== My Little Pony: Micro-series (February–December 2013) ==
This is a list of My Little Pony: Micro-series issues.

No.	Title	United States release date	United States ISBN
01	Twilight Sparkle	February 20, 2013	—
Twilight Sparkle is sent by Princess Celestia to help the injured Royal Archive librarian, Summer Mane, to shelve books. Summer is reluctant for help until Twilight lies about her possibly being replaced if she doesn't accept the help. Summer's demands for shelving are strict, and orders Twilight to stay out of her office. Despite Summer's coldness, Twilight finds she and Summer share a love of books, including the solitary work of author Jade Singer, who since disappeared after its publication. One day, Twilight is caught peeking into Summer's office, and Summer orders her away until Twilight reveals that she has known Summer to be really Jade Singer for some time. Jade admits she hid herself away at the Archives, afraid to release another book that would fail to meet the expectations from her first, but Twilight explains that as Celestia's student, she has to live with that every day but is supported by her Ponyville friends and offers the same friendship to Jade. Inspired, Jade publishes her next book with great success, and Celestia thanks Twilight for helping her old friend.: Thomas Zahler (story, art, lettering); Ronda Pattison (coloring); Bobby Curnow (editor)
02	Rainbow Dash	March 20, 2013	—
Two cloud gremlins bring in a thundercloud during Ponyville's Summerfell Festival, and when Rainbow Dash tries to dispel it, the gremlins are able to stop her, injuring her wings in the process. A month later after Rainbow's wings are healed, with the cloud still over Ponyville and depressing its residents, Rainbow Dash tries other means to get rid of the gremlins, but they are able to feed off the negative emotions in town. Inspired, Rainbow pushes herself to dangerous speeds to create a Sonic Double Rainboom, cheering up the residents and breaking the gremlins' spell, allowing Rainbow to finally get rid of the cloud. However, this severely injures her wings, and she believes she won't fly again. Applejack gets her to help with selling apple dishes made from apples infused with the magic from the Double Rainboom and tricks Rainbow into showing that she can fly again, cheering the pegasus up.: Ryan K. Lindsay (story); Tony Fleecs (art); Neil Uyetake (lettering); Bobby Curnow (editor)
03	Rarity (a.k.a. "How Rarity Got Her Groovy Back")	April 24, 2013	—
Prior to a big fashion show in Canterlot, Applejack arranges a rural spa retreat for Rarity to help her relax. The spa, run by hippies Wheat Grass and Flax Seed is more like a farm, where Rarity reluctantly helps them with manual labor to collect natural materials they use to make "spiritual enhancers" which Rarity finds to be great health and beauty products. However, as she reaches her breaking point and demands a refund, she learns that the farm is in danger of being sold to Flim and Flam to make way for a new Filthy Rich megastore. Rarity gets the idea to help commercialize their health and beauty products to raise money to help keep the farm, premiering the new line alongside her fashion show in Canterlot with great success for both endeavours.: Katie Cook (story); Andy Price (art); Heather Breckel (coloring); Neil Uyetake (lettering); Bobby Curnow (editor)
04	Fluttershy	May 29, 2013	—
Princess Celestia announces an art contest in Canterlot. Fluttershy, who secretly is highly adept at creating fantastic knitted works, wants to enter but fears rejection of her art from her friends and the judges, but Angel Bunny helps to convince her to go. She disguises herself at the contest. The Canterlot elite snub all of the works, including Fluttershy's. Fluttershy tries to defend her work as something that she loves, but the elite ignore her reasoning. Rarity, who has been with the elite, recognizes Fluttershy and tells her to be proud of her work and stand up for it. When Princess Celestia herself arrives to judge the works, she loves Fluttershy's artwork and awards her the top prize; the Canterlot elite quickly agree with Celestia's assessments. Fluttershy realizes she can share her knitting skills with her friends without worrying about being judged.: Barbara Kesel (story); Tony Fleecs (art); Neil Uyetake (lettering); Bobby Curnow (editor)
05	Pinkie Pie	June 19, 2013	—
Pinkie Pie wins tickets to see a show by her idol, the famous clown Ponyacci. She and Twilight Sparkle go to the show but while waiting in line, Pinkie finds an older depressed pony whom Pinkie cannot cheer up. They enjoy the performance by Ponyacci and Pinkie goes to look for him backstage, only to find that Ponyacci was the older pony they met earlier. He reveals that his sadness was from this show being his last, as he is retiring from being a clown due to his age. Pinkie comes up with an idea to perform a large routine for Ponyacci to convince him to return to show business. Her display does not change Ponyacci's mind, though he does offer her several bits of advice for improving her own acts. Pinkie comes across the idea of Ponyacci opening a clown training school, allowing him to still be part of the profession he enjoys, and he readily agrees with that. Though Twilight suggests Pinkie take part in the school, Pinkie is more satisfied with helping Ponyacci continue to realize his dream.: Ted Anderson (story); Ben Bates (art); Neil Uyetake (lettering); Bobby Curnow (editor)
06	Applejack	July 10, 2013	—
As Applejack and her family prepare numerous apple products for the Hearths Warming Eve season, they find their precious crop of apples are being transformed into squashes by the legendary Sass Squash monster, which Granny Smith had once witnessed as a filly. Applejack promises to go capture the beast on her own, refusing her family's desire to help. The Sass Squash proves too elusive for Applejack, causing her traps to backfire on her, and Applejack soon accepts she'll need the help of her family. As Granny runs into the forest to lure out the creature with pots and pans, Applejack, Apple Bloom, and Big Macintosh prepare a trap. The Sass Squash soon appears and is captured, but the three are surprised to find the "creature" is really Granny in a large suit. She had made the suit as a way to bring their family together during the hard work of the season as a way to break from the chore. As they settle back into routine, Applejack is surprised to find a photo of a younger Granny having met the real Sass Squash, while elsewhere, Granny leaves a freshly baked pie for the creature, thanking it for its work over the last few days.: Bobby Curnow (story); Brenda Hickley (art); Heather Breckel (coloring); Neil Uyetake (lettering); Bobby Curnow (editor)
	My Little Pony: Pony Tales, Vol. 1	November 13, 2013	978-1-61377-740-4
Collection of Issues 1 through 6 of the micro-comics.
07	The Cutie Mark Crusaders	August 21, 2013	—
The Cutie Mark Crusaders discover a young Mimicker, a creature able to take the form of any non-pony object, while on a hike, and decided to call it Imp and have her join their club. They try to help Imp practice her mimicking abilities, but they get a bit too excited and start having her try more complex items. Imp soon runs away, and the fillies realize that they have only been considering themselves and not Imp's feelings. They soon find Imp and apologize, and realizing that it would be better to return Imp to where they found her, and consider the possibility of being friends once they all have matured.: Ted Anderson (story); Ben Bates (art); Neil Uyetake (lettering); Bobby Curnow (editor)
08	Princess Celestia	September 11, 2013	—
When a banquet gets out of hand and causes the food to become enchanted at Princess Celestia's school, the elderly teacher Inkwell steps in to stop it with powerful magic that scares the fillies. The Pony-Teacher Association, led by the haughty Floribunda, demand Celestia force Inkwell into retirement, but Celestia considers Inkwell a long-time friend and a key professor at the school despite her age. Celestia finds a line in the bylaws that allows her to pick the test to prove Inkwell's competency. At the meeting the next day, Celestia challenges Inkwell to transform an ugly frog into something beautiful, but Inkwell refuses, already considering the frog beautiful. Floribunda and the other parents start to complain until Celestia points out that when they were fillies in school, Inkwell provided the same confidence for them during rough times. The parents withdraw their request and apologize to Princess Celestia and Inkwell.: Georgia Ball (story); Amy Mebberson (art); Neil Uyetake (lettering); Bobby Curnow (editor)
09	Spike	November 13, 2013	—
Spike is jealous of his friends having pets, and when he spots an ad for "Sea Beasts" in a comic book, he races to order them, hoping to raise them as pets. The Beasts, as delivered, are unimpressive, but Spike gets an idea and feeds them magical growth formula. They do grow and Spike is able to teach them tricks, but rewards them with more of the growth formula, causing them to replicate and start to ruin the library, Spike stepping in before two sides go to war with each other. Spike is inspired and starts to teach the Beasts from the library books, but falls asleep mid-lesson due to exhaustion. The Beasts continue to read on their own, and by the time Spike wakes up, the Beasts have grown peaceful and intelligent, and thank Spike for raising them before they embark to explore the world on their own.: Rob Anderson (story); Agnes Garbowska (art); Neil Uyetake (lettering); Bobby Curnow (editor)
10	Luna	December 18, 2013	—
Princess Luna describes her excitement from her duties the night before to Princess Celestia, who thinks the events were otherwise mundane compared to her daylight tasks. Luna takes this as a challenge and offers to rule Canterlot for the day. Celestia puts her in the capabilities of her aide Kibitz that keeps Luna to a tight schedule of otherwise boring administrative activities. As the day progresses, Luna's sleepiness and boredom begin to take its toll, and when Kibitz tries to adhere to the demanding schedule, Luna foregoes it, and continues to do the royal duties but at her own pace. Celestia, who secretly spent the day at a spa, returns and congratulates an exhausted Luna for handling the day shift, before retiring for the night and letting Luna return to her night duties.: Katie Cook (story); Andy Price (art); Heather Breckel (coloring); Neil Uyetake (lettering); Bobby Curnow (editor)
	My Little Pony: Pony Tales, Vol. 2	February 18, 2014	978-1-61377-873-9
Collection of Issues 7 through 10 of the micro-comics.

== My Little Pony: Friends Forever (January 2014–April 2017) ==
This is a list of My Little Pony: Friends Forever issues.

No.	Title	United States release date	United States ISBN
01	The Pie's the Limit (Applejack and Pinkie Pie)	January 22, 2014	—
Pinkie Pie and several others enter an Equestria baking contest, while Applejack, there to deliver catering for the event, is mistaken as the final competitor, Marine Sandwich, who vows revenge on the contest. As the contest proceeds, Pinkie and Applejack find one of the competitors, Toffee Truffle, is trying to win to reopen a favorite Dodge City restaurant, and Pinkie and Applejack agree to try to lose to help Toffee win. Going into the last event, Marine suddenly barges in and uses a fondant thrower to cover the other contestants and audience. Pinkie, Applejack, and Toffee use Toffee's desserts to clog the device and stop Marine's rampage. The judges award Toffee the grand prize for both a tasty and practical dessert, much to Pinkie and Applejack's delight.: Alex de Campi (story, lettering); Carla Speed McNeil (art); Jenn Manley Lee, Bill Mudrow (coloring); Bobby Curnow (editor)
02	Cutie Mark Crusaders and Discord	February 26, 2014	—
The Cutie Mark Crusaders have run out of ideas for how to get their cutie marks. Finding Discord outside, they ask for his help in creating scenarios with his magic for them to try. Discord creates a reality bubble and starts inventing situations for the Crusaders, but slowly becomes annoyed at their antics and makes more fantastical situations. He is unaware that the stronger magic is causing the reality bubble to grow and overtake Ponyville. After numerous attempts, the Crusaders admit that even with Discord's help, they still won't likely get their cutie marks, and show their appreciation for his help, offering to make him an honorary Crusader. Discord is touched by the offer and dispels the bubble, apologizing to the town for putting them in jeopardy.: Jeremy Whitley (story); Tony Fleecs (art); Lauren Perry (coloring); Neil Uyetake (lettering); Bobby Curnow (editor)
03	Spike and Celestia	March 12, 2014	—
Spike asks Princess Celestia for help for getting Twilight a new telescope as a birthday gift for her. Celestia's astrologer can make one, but needs crystals to make the lens from a distant mountain. To Spike's surprise, Celestia cancels her duties for the day to come with him and help. During their travels, Spike complains that he is not an adventurer like Twilight and her friends, but Celestia asserts that he can be if he wants. Despite various dangers they encounter, Celestia encourages Spike to help save them instead of using her own abilities. The two make it safely to the mountain and retrieve a lens, though when they get trapped in a cave after a volcanic eruption, Celestia steps in to remove the obstacle blocking their way, noting that at times the teacher needs to help the student. They return safely to Canterlot, and Spike is able to give Twilight her new telescope, while he later gets a letter from Celestia thanking him for the adventure and assuring their friendship.: Ted Anderson (story); Agnes Garbowska (art); Neil Uyetake (lettering); Bobby Curnow (editor)
04	Twilight Sparkle and Shining Armor	April 9, 2014	—
Twilight Sparkle travels to the Crystal Empire to spend some quality time with her older brother, Shining Armor, and recounts their childhood game of "monster hunters" they used to play. At the Empire, Shining is overwhelmed by business for the kingdom while his wife Cadance is away, and apologizes to Twilight. That night, one of Twilight's books is stolen, and she learns that several other books have gone missing, with the other residents fearing a ghost exists. Twilight and Shining, doubtful of this claim, stumble onto a secret passage into the depths of the castle originally created by King Sombra, and decide to go "monster hunting" once again to find the culprit. Avoiding numerous traps, they come across a crystal bard creature, who had been captured by Sombra to read to him in its soothing voice, but managed to escape; Sombra had laid the traps to try to recapture it. Finding the crystal bard with all the missing books, which it liked to read from and had only intended to borrow, Shining and Twilight explain that Sombra is long gone and offer the bard the task of helping in the royal library. Twilight and Shining finish out their visit peacefully.: Rob Anderson (story); Amy Mebberson (art); Heather Breckel (coloring); Neil Uyetake (lettering); Bobby Curnow (editor)
	My Little Pony: Friends Forever, Vol. 1	July 8, 2014	978-1613779811
Collection of Issues 1 through 4 of the "Friends Forever" series.
05	Fluttershy and Zecora	May 21, 2014	—
Fluttershy wakes up one day to find that all her animal friends can speak normally with her, shocking her. As no other pony seems to have heard the animals talk, Fluttershy thinks she is going crazy and goes to talk to Zecora. Zecora can find nothing wrong with her and starts to suspect the animals. Fluttershy runs off after one of the critters to find that they have been planning a large tea party for her, and she gladly joins in, telling them her tales of adventure. Zecora concludes someone enchanted the animals, who is revealed to be Discord. Discord only wanted to give the animals the temporary ability to talk as a gift to Fluttershy to show his friendship for her, which Fluttershy happily accepts.: Thomas Zahler (story); Tony Fleecs (art); Heather Breckel (coloring); Neil Uyetake (lettering); Bobby Curnow (editor)
06	Trixie and Rainbow Dash	June 18, 2014	—
Rainbow Dash is summoned to a distance kingdom to perform, and is surprised to find Trixie there as ruler of the Diamond Dogs. Trixie is trapped there as their ruler after mistakenly leading the Dogs to believe that she can douse for gems whereupon they made her their queen, using a magical crown that prevents her from leaving. Rainbow learns that the crown's magic is only powered by the faith the Dogs have in their rulers, and together with Trixie, create a plan that puts the Dogs' faith in Trixie in question and giving Rainbow enough time to distract the Dogs during the show to help Trixie escape.: Thomas Zahler (story); Agnes Garbowska (art); Amy Mebberson (coloring); Bobby Curnow (editor)
07	Luna and Pinkie Pie	July 23, 2014	—
Princess Luna worries that she is not funny enough for the upcoming "Chuckle-lot" festival. She first goes to Twilight for help but Twilight instead suggests Luna learn from Pinkie. Pinkie helps Luna to show aspects of practical jokes and slapstick comedy both around Ponyville and in Canterlot. However, when it comes to preparing the routine the next day, Luna is worried that she will be mocked in trying to outdo her sister. Pinkie reminds her that comedy is not only about making others laugh, but being able to laugh at yourself. At the festival, Luna appears and gives Celestia a gift, which turns out to be loaded with a cream pie. A pie fight soon breaks out among the guests. Luna slips and falls in the creme and crashes into Celestia. After a pause she realizes the humor of the situation and laughs at herself along with everyone else, accepting Pinkie's advice.: Jeremy Whitley (story); Tony Fleecs (art); Amy Mebberson (coloring); Bobby Curnow (editor)
08	Applejack and Rarity	August 20, 2014	—
Applejack is told by Granny Smith that their cousins on the west coast need to buy some of their apples, and when Applejack tells Rarity this, she wants to come along in part to see the sights of Applewood in the west and sightsee along the way. Their travels become muddled when Rarity's sightseeing causes them to mistakenly get on the wrong train and go on a detour. They continue to get into transportation problems, all while Rarity is enjoying the trip much to Applejack's anger. Soon, Rarity learns that this was a business deal, and that Applejack's sales plan is woefully underthought, and she helps Applejack to develop a better plan and focusing on getting to Applewood. Once safely there, Applejack thanks Rarity for her help and takes her to a day at the Whinney Land amusement park before going to meet her cousins. However, her cousins are just as surprised to see her; meanwhile Granny Smith realizes she misread the letter and that it was their east coast cousins that needed the apples.: Katie Cook (story); Andy Price (art); Heather Breckel (coloring); Bobby Curnow (editor)
	My Little Pony: Friends Forever, Vol. 2	December 2, 2014	978-1631401596
Collection of Issues 5 through 8 of the "Friends Forever" series.
09	Granny Smith and the Flim Flam Brothers	September 10, 2014	—
While helping the rest of the Apple family to sell their produce at an Apple convention, Granny Smith finds that the dubious con artist brothers, Flim and Flam, are no longer worker together despite trying to sell the same product at different sides of the con. She finds out that, weeks prior, the two had fallen in love with Marian, a librarian from Dodge Junction, but as they each tried to win her heart, their bickering caused her to turn them both down, and the two went their separate ways. Granny realizes that she had caused a similar brotherly separation when she was younger that was never repaired, and despite Flim and Flam's past altercations with the Apples, helps to bring the two brothers back together by the end of the con.: Christine Rice (story); Tony Fleecs (art); Amy Mebberson (coloring); Bobby Curnow (editor)
10	Fluttershy and Iron Will	October 22, 2014	—
Fluttershy's friends are alerted that Iron Will is back in town and looking for her, and they race to her cottage to help protect her from him. However, Fluttershy is more than happy to see what Iron Will wants, where they learn that he's been kicked out of his maze by his wife for being too assertive and is looking for Fluttershy's help to calm down. She is happy to help, and tries to put him through several situations to help learn patience and understanding. Fluttershy suggests a bit of time at the spa but when Rainbow Dash comes in and teases Iron Will for finding his "inner pony", he storms off to Everfree Forest. Fluttershy follows the minotaur to the forest, where he reveals that the reason he was kicked out was that his son, who he is proud of, has been taking too many of his assertive mannerism and has been using that against his mother and his teachers at school. Fluttershy helps to remind him that while being assertive can be good, that there's a time and a place for it, and if he can show more care around his family, his son will pick up on his good habits as well. Iron Will is impressed by this advice, and before he goes, treats Fluttershy and her friends to a meal.: Christine Rice (story); Agnes Garbowska (art); Amy Mebberson (coloring)
11	Spitfire and Rainbow Dash	November 12, 2014	—
Rainbow Dash travels to Cloudsdale for a very important mission under Spitfire's orders, abandoning her plans with Scootaloo. She is surprised to find that Spitfire needs her to help teach a class of pegasus colts and fillies to fly. As Spitfire struggles to get the students to respect her, Dash suggests that she take the same approach with them that she uses to command and train the Wonderbolts. The attempt ends in disaster when all the foals break down in tears under her haranguing, but Dash barges in with news of a rogue tornado closing in on the school. Spitfire expertly brings it under control, earning a round of cheers from the students, and realizes that Dash set up the tornado in order to give her a chance to win their respect and admiration. With the students now clamoring eagerly for more lessons, Spitfire thanks Dash for helping build her confidence as a teacher. When Dash returns to Ponyville, she apologizes to Scootaloo for breaking their earlier plans and takes her on a flying trip.: Ted Anderson (story); Jay P. Fosgitt (art)
12	Pinkie Pie and Twilight Sparkle	December 10, 2014	—
The annual street vendor fair has come to Ponyville, and just as Twilight and Spike are about to go enjoy the wares, Pinkie barges into the castle asking for Twilight's help in breaking her addiction to a snack known as Phenomnomenons. Twilight first tries to use aversion therapy techniques, but Pinkie is too easily drawn by the snack to stay in one place. Next Twilight locks up the castle and constructs an elaborate system to trap Pinkie if she tries to escape, but Pinkie's hyperactivity allows her to avoid the traps and break out. She begins to gorge herself on Phenomnomenons and urges Twilight to try them; the first bite overwhelms her, and both eat until they are sick. Realizing that Pinkie must decide to quit on her own, Twilight feigns an emotional breakdown due to the failure of her plans. Pinkie rushes to her aid, forgoing the snacks, and Twilight points out that she has resisted her urge through force of will. Pinkie successfully wills herself not to eat a Phenomnomenon offered to her, then thanks Twilight for her help before going off in search of a different snack.: Barbara Kesel (story); Brenda Hickey (art); Amy Mebberson (art, coloring)
	My Little Pony: Friends Forever, Vol. 3	April 14, 2015	978-1631402432
Collection of Issues 9 through 12 of the "Friends Forever" series.
	My Little Pony: Friends Forever Omnibus, Vol. 1	November 15, 2016	978-1631407710
Collection of Issues 1 through 12 of the "Friends Forever" series.
13	Rarity and Babs Seed	January 7, 2015	—
Rarity and Sweetie Belle are about to go to Manehattan, with Sweetie planning to visit Babs Seed while Rarity works on some outfits for Sapphire Shores. However, Sweetie comes down with an ear infection, and Rarity is forced to go on her own. As she is preparing the outfits in Manehattan, Babs stops by, disappointed that Sweetie had to miss the trip. Rarity offers to take her around town instead, but her choice destinations - a spa, a hair stylist, and a clothing shop - are of no interest to Babs, who thanks her for the effort but decides to go home. Later, during a fitting, Sapphire listens to Rarity's account of the day and suggests that she should find a way to encourage Babs' interests even if she does not share them, as Rarity's parents did for her when she was young. Inspired by this advice, Rarity surprises Babs with tickets and post-game passes to a roller derby event that evening. Babs meets one of her favorite athletes, who reveals that her own mother did not understand her interest in the sport at first but is now one of her biggest fans. Once Rarity returns to Ponyville, she and Sweetie send Babs a custom-made roller derby outfit and write in their journal about the importance of letting children follow their own interests and supporting them along the way.: Jeremy Whitley (story); Agnes Garbowska (art)
14	Princess Luna and Spike	March 4, 2015	—
Princess Luna asks Spike to help her stop an arson crime spree in the city of Fillydelphia. En route, she explains that the unicorn police believe dragons from the city's Dragon Town district are responsible and asks Spike to find out whatever he can. Once they arrive, the police show them a trail of slime leading from the site of the latest fire. Spike considers this to be unnatural for dragons and starts to canvass the neighborhood, while Luna works with the police. None of the dragons Spike questions prove cooperative except for Mina, an excitable young female who runs a comic shop. Mina explains that Fillydelphia's ponies and dragons have a long-standing resentment and understands why the police are blaming the dragons. She thinks that a unicorn may be responsible for the fires, but Luna and the police dismiss this theory; frustrated at having found no new leads of her own, Luna leaves Spike to continue investigating alone. Spike notices a fresh slime trail leading from the sewers to a building and follows it to find a fire snail. He captures it, but not before it ignites the slime and sets the building ablaze. As the fire spreads, Spike persuades the police to let the dragons help by evacuating nearby buildings to prevent injuries, and Luna returns in time to wake the sleeping residents so they can get out safely. With the dragons cleared of any wrongdoing, the police agree to make sure the fire snails do not cause any more trouble, and Luna apologizes to the dragons for distrusting them. Spike takes her to meet Mina, who is a huge fan of reformed comic villains, and promises to visit the dragons of Fillydelphia again as he and Luna start for home.: Jeremy Whitley (story); Agnes Garbowska (art); Amy Mebberson (art, coloring)
15	Mayor Mare and Applejack	March 25, 2015	—
Applejack gets a citation about the height of her barn and goes to the town hall to try to have it voided. After some initial runaround, Mayor Mare arrives and promises to help her, taking her on a tour of the offices. Applejack is stunned to see how dysfunctional the government appears to be, but the Mayor assures her everything is working, and offers to let her observe some of the functions and perhaps offer ideas for improvement. Applejack is able to solve many of the problems stalling the departments. As the day nears its end, there is a sudden commotion outside, as Sweetie Belle's magic is turning ponies into fruits and vegetables. Applejack is stunned, but the Mayor quickly and calmly orders her assistant to manage and solve the problem. The spell is quickly reversed and everyone is turned back to normal. Applejack is surprised by the Mayor's aptitude in the situation, and the Mayor explains that she learned from her past that she needed to learn how to make the various types of ponies all work together to run Ponyville successfully, and hopes that Applejack will follow in her footsteps, being as practical as she is. The Mayor reveals this was her plan for the day all along and voids the barn height citation.: Bobby Curnow (story); Brenda Hickey (art); Amy Mebberson (art, coloring)
16	Diamond Tiara and Silver Spoon	May 13, 2015	—
Diamond Tiara and Silver Spoon want to beat the Cutie Mark Crusaders in the Ponyville schoolhouse's annual scavenger hunt, but only groups of three can enter. Diamond's father, Filthy Rich, hires the famous filly detective Prancy Drew as their teammate. Prancy is able to quickly decipher the hunt's clues, but due to luck and coincidence, the Crusaders end up close behind; even Silver's attempt to throw them off track does not slow them down for long. Prancy injures her leg on the final sprint to the finish line, but Diamond leaves her behind as she and Silver complete the course. The Crusaders help Prancy across the line, but end up losing the contest due to a technicality in the rules. Diamond and Silver win first prize, tickets to a bluegrass concert they have no interest in attending, but Filthy loves the music and drags them along. For second place, the Crusaders receive tickets to a second concert, donated by the band after they saw how many teams had signed up, and have a much more enjoyable time. Diamond and Silver realize that there is more to life than winning.: Jeremy Whitley (story); Jenn Blake (art); Amy Mebberson, Jenn Blake (cover artist)
	My Little Pony: Friends Forever, Vol. 4	September 1, 2015	978-1631403774
Collection of Issues 13 through 16 of the "Friends Forever" series.
17	Twilight Sparkle and Big Macintosh	June 3, 2015	—
As Twilight struggles to resolve the steadily growing pile of friendship problems being sent to her, she begins to feel stress and lose sleep. At Spike's urging, she talks to other ponies around town to see how they handle stress. Applejack, about to start a delivery run to Canterlot, suggests that she talk to Big Macintosh. However, his taciturn responses give Twilight no insight into how he maintains his composure. She casts a spell on him that will let her enter his mind and see its workings. She is surprised to find Big Mac's mind laid out as a well-organized apple farm, with ideas slowly growing and ripening as fruit on the trees. There are also several alternate versions of Big Mac, each representing a different aspect of his personality. His curiosity becomes intrigued by Twilight's own stress and pulls her, himself, and the other Big Macs into her mind, which appears as a vast but disordered library. The Big Macs suggest that she needs to take some time off from her problems and try to concentrate on one thing at a time. Twilight ends the spell, returning herself to the real world, and offers to help Big Mac with his chores so she can clear her mind. Once the work is done, she returns to her castle and gets back to work, seeing new ways to solve the friendship problems.: Ted Anderson (story); Brenda Hickey (art); Amy Mebberson (cover artist)
18	Fluttershy and Rainbow Dash	July 1, 2015	—
Rainbow Dash and Fluttershy receive invitations to a flight camp reunion in Cloudsdale. While Rainbow Dash is excited to attend, Fluttershy decides at first to stay home, remembering how the other foals bullied her for her weak flying skills. Rainbow persuades her to go, promising to stand by her if the other pegasi give her a hard time. When they arrive, though, Rainbow finds herself accepting multiple challenges to race and show off her stunts. Left on her own, Fluttershy happens across Cirrus Cloud, the reunion organizer, who had been one of her worst bullies at camp. Cirrus says that she has a surprise planned for Fluttershy at that night's party, but Fluttershy begins to think that she is being set up for a cruel prank. Several other pegasi act strangely and hurry off at her approach, worsening her fear, and she hides under a table as soon as the party starts. She confesses to Rainbow that she never felt at ease in Cloudsdale, and that returning to let everypony laugh at her all over again is painful for her. Rainbow apologizes for failing to keep her promise and reassures Fluttershy that her friends in Ponyville are the only ones whose opinions really matter. Fluttershy emerges and, with Rainbow by her side, goes onstage to receive Cirrus' surprise - an apology, an aerial display, and a special award in recognition of all she has accomplished since moving to Ponyville.: Christina Rice (story); Jay P. Fosgitt (art); Amy Mebberson (cover artist)
19	Rarity and the Cake Family	August 5, 2015	—
After attending a wedding catered by the Cakes, Rarity sees the potential of she joining business forces with the Cakes. The Cakes are worried but agree to see what happens. Rarity heads to Canterlot to get some fabric, where she runs into Touring Wind, an influential fashion magazine editor. Touring Wind has heard of Rarity and welcomes the chance to see her outfits and makes time in her busy schedule to come to Ponyville a few days from now. Rarity is a bit panicked but believes she can do it, until she gets back to Ponyville and finds that the Cakes have accepted catering another wedding the day after Touring Wind's visit. The ceremony is for AJ's cousins, Ginger Gold and Apple Crisp, who want a rather simple wedding. Rarity, knowing she cannot work to impress Touring Wind and design for the wedding in the limited time, pushes the Cakes and the wedding couple to go with a much fancier ceremony. The day of Touring Wind's visit comes and Rarity goes to see her at the train station. When they get back to Sugarcube Corner, however, they find that Ginger Gold has come down with an allergic reaction to the strawberries Rarity insisted they use for the cake, and that the giant cake Rarity demanded is on the verge of collapse. Touring Wind walks out, and works out how to get back to Canterlot as soon as possible. Rarity breaks down, but is surprised at how calm the Cakes are taking the situation, having prepared a quick remedy for Ginger and cleaned up the mess the Cake had made. They explain that having twins helps them keep their cool in tough situations, as well as to be extra prepared and had prepared the batter and frosting for the simpler cake that the couple wanted in the first place. The next day, the Cakes are able to stop Touring Wind from leaving, and invite her to attend the wedding. After Spike causes the trains to become delayed, Touring Wind has little reason to decline. At Sweet Apple Acres, she finds that Rarity has developed a fashionable yet simple dress for Ginger, and that the Cakes' new wedding cake Touring Wind promises to write this up in her magazine, and Rarity apologizes to the Cakes for going overboard, but they remind her that her confidence is part of the reason why they love her.: Christina Rice (story); Brenda Hickey (art); Amy Mebberson (cover artist)
20	Discord and Princess Luna	September 9, 2015	—
Discord is having a hard time sleeping, and when his powers activate unintentionally during one bad nightmare, wreaking havoc on Ponyville, Twilight Sparkle calls in the help of Princess Luna to see what is wrong with Discord's dreams. After zapping him to sleep, Luna finds that while Discord's mind is as chaotic as his normal self, his inner psyche tries to latch him down, forcing him to think in an orderly, business-like fashion. Luna helps to free Discord from this, helping to escape this to see what is really going on with Discord. They come to a hallways of doors, which one particular door is locked up with numerous warning signs on it. Luna wants to investigate that one, but Discord refuses to, instead going into other doors marked with the cutie marks of the Mane 6. In each of these, his actions, while well-intentioned, turn into catastrophe for that pony. Luna suspects what is behind the locked door, finding that it belongs to Fluttershy. Inside, in a more tranquil setting, the two watch as another version of Discord prepare to take Fluttershy and the Cutie Mark Crusaders on another wild adventure. Luna realizes Discord cares deeply for Fluttershy, but Discord notes that he had cared for others in his past, such as Tirek, and it always turned out bad. Luna notes that caring for others is not a bad quality, and can help empower others to do good. Discord takes this to heart, and lets his concerns about harming Fluttershy go. Later, Discord helps to repay Luna's favor by joining her during her nightly duties.: Jeremy Whitley (story); Brenda Hickey (art); Amy Mebberson (cover artist)
	My Little Pony: Friends Forever Vol. 5	December 17, 2015	978-1631404887
Collection of Issues 17 through 20 of the "Friends Forever" series.
21	Spike and Zecora	October 7, 2015	—
A strange ailment strikes every pony in Ponyville, and Spike, immune to whatever it is, rushes out to Zecora in the Everfree Forest to get her help. Zecora collects a number of potions and tools to help out, as well as a bird named Avery, trained by Fluttershy, that can help to intercept any coughs directed her way. In town, Zecora goes to work to try to understand the illness. She sees that it has traveled as far as Sweet Apple Acres, and tries to understand how it could travel so far so far. After they see the Apples, Spike recognizes he is a different species from the ponies, which likely has made him immune to whatever it is; but this also leads to both realizing how far they are from others of their kind and feel a bit of homesickness. They stop at Fluttershy's cottage, but she has been so sick that she's been unable to feed her animals properly, and just has laid out stashes of food for them. Avery is distracted by a pile of birdseed that when Fluttershy coughs on Zecora, he is not there to block it. Fearing Zecora is now infected, they race off to isolate Zecora, but surprisingly, she does not come down with anything, and now they suspect that zebras are also immune. With this, the two set to work to try to find anything pony-related that might caught it, but still cannot find a solution. The two take a break to have a meal, and discuss the results. Shortly, Zecora suddenly feels ill and has caught whatever the ponies have had. Spike deduces that it is not an infection but something on the hay that Zecora and the rest of the town would have eaten, while he had his normal gem diet. Quickly discovering the fungus that has covered the town's hay supply, Spike begins to prepare a broth to help cure Zecora. By the time the Canterlot Disease Corps have arrived, every pony is cured. Spike goes off to thank Zecora for her help, and he offers to visit her more and invites her to visit him in town.: Ted Anderson (story); Agnes Garbowska (art); Amy Mebberson (cover artist)
22	Princess Celestia and Pinkie Pie	November 4, 2015	—
Twilight and Pinkie are invited to Canterlot by request of Princess Celestia. Once there, they learn that Princess Luna's birthday is coming up, and Celestia wants Twilight to give a toast speech for her sister, while Pinkie is to help bake a cake for Luna. Pinkie offers several suggestions, but Celestia asks her to come up with something both grand and fun at the same time, and gives her run of the royal kitchen to create something with help of her head chef Chase Palomino. Pinkie takes to the task with gusto, but when Celestia starts taking a keen interest in how she's doing, Pinkie starts panicking that her creations won't live up to Celestia's expectations. When Celestia checks up on her again, she finds Pinkie has starting talking to her imaginary friends. Celestia quickly helps to talk Pinkie back to normal, and explains why this cake is so important to her: that she still feels guilt over banishing her sister to the moon a thousand years in the past, and really wants to make sure this celebration goes well. Pinkie realizes what Celestia is looking for and is inspired for a new cake design, offering Celestia to help out. At the birthday party, Luna is initially dismissive of the cake, but when she realizes that it is how Celestia shows her love for her, she knows how much it meant to her and gratefully hugs her sister, while Twilight congratulates Pinkie on a job well done.: Christina Rice (story); Jay Fosgitt (art); Amy Mebberson, Jay Fosgitt (cover artist)
23	Applejack and Fluttershy	December 2, 2015	—
Applejack and Fluttershy are spending a quiet weekend camping in woods near Ponyville when a swarm of eager ponies arrive, excitedly looking for something. They find out from one of the lead searchers, Nosey News, that they are looking for the legendary "pigasus", a pig that can fly, which she had claimed was recently photographed in the area. Both AJ and Fluttershy avoid getting caught into the search, but the presence of the other ponies intrudes on their camping. When they return to their tent, they are surprised to encounter the real pigasus, which Fluttershy quickly helps to calm down, and both quickly agree that they have to keep quiet about it, as the other ponies would want to drag it away and take it out of its natural habitat. However, they know the other ponies will likely ask them if they have seen it. AJ, knowing Fluttershy will likely crumble at the first hint of aggression, offers to try to lie to the others, even though it both goes against her Element as well as knowing that a lie can hurt the one that tells it. AJ goes to address the crowd of ponies, but manages to dodge the various questions without lying, but this only serves to make the crowd suspicious, and they start to approach their tent. AJ arrives first, and tries to keep the other ponies at bay, and when Nosey asks her directly if she had seen the pigasus, AJ is on the verge of telling the truth when something bursts out of the tent and flies away. The ponies follow it, only to find it was Fluttershy, taking a fly in her sleeping bag. Nosey berates her for fooling them, telling her it will ruin her scheme. Nosey realizes she just admitted to faking the picture of the pigasus, and the other ponies chase her out of the forest, while AJ, Fluttershy and the pigasus watch from their quiet camping spot.: Ted Anderson (story); Tony Fleecs (art); Amy Mebberson, Tony Fleecs (cover artist)
24	Gilda and Rarity	January 6, 2016	—
Rarity is surprised when Gilda shows up at her boutique and sheepishly asks for her help in designing the new team uniforms for Griffonstone's boffyball team, who have managed to make it into a playoff games. More than happy to help, Rarity returns with Gilda to Griffonstone and finds that the team struggles with coordination, particular from a fumbling Firegem. Due to a lack of other griffons that have trained in the sport and that haven't come down with a flu that has been going around, Firegem tries to contribute despite Coach Klaus' reprimands for his poor performance. Rarity tries to take sympathy on him, but Gilda assures her he's okay. The next day, as the game against the yaks is about to start, the griffons find they are down yet another player, and would forfeit without a substitute. Rarity offers to take the spot, having watched enough of the practice to get the gist of the sport. The game goes about as expected, with the griffons unable to score against the yaks. Firegem has been getting trounced by the yaks, and Coach Klaus flies off the ground in anger, resulting in his eviction from the game. Gilda, now the assistant coach, decides to change their strategy to put Firegem out of harms' way and try a risky play that assures they will score a point. Rarity manages to use her head, literally, to make the scoring play. The game ends shortly thereafter, with the yaks having won, 53–1. Though the griffons knew they wouldn't win, scoring at least one point helps to encourage them for the next season, now with new uniforms supplied by Rarity. Rarity returns to her boutique, and surprises one of her customers with her newfound knowledge of the sport of boffyball.: Georgia Ball (story); Jay Fosgitt (art); Amy Mebberson, Jay Fosgitt (cover artist)
	My Little Pony: Friends Forever, Vol. 6	April 26, 2016	978-1631405969
Collection of Issues 21 through 24 of the "Friends Forever" series.
	My Little Pony: Friends Forever Omnibus, Vol. 2	May 9, 2017	978-1631408823
Collection of Issues 13 through 24 of the "Friends Forever" series.
25	Rainbow Dash and Twilight Sparkle	February 3, 2016	—
Rainbow Dash wakes up one day to discover that here wings have suddenly vanished. She immediately goes to Twilight Sparkle who finds out her wings have been taken by three unicorns who are planning on using them to make themselves Alicorns. They make their way to them but are eventually captured. Rainbow comes up with a plan to link herself with Twilight so she can fly her. The two of them do a Sonic Rainboom and destroy the unicorn's spell. Rainbow gets her wings back and, as punishment for their crimes, Twilight puts a spell on the three unicorns that temporarily renders them magicless.: Barbara Kesel (story); Brenda Hickey (art); Tony Fleecs, Brenda Hickey (cover artist)
26	Shining Armor and Prince Blueblood	March 16, 2016	—
Shining Armor is planning on going to a Yakyakistan trade agreement with Princess Cadence. However, Cadence has to go with the other princesses for something else so Princess Celestia sends her nephew, Prince Blueblood, with Shining over his protests. At first, the trip doesn't go well, Shining is disgusted at Blueblood such as his use of luxuries such as using a palanquin to get there instead of walking even if the soldiers carrying him have no complaints. However, Shining's negotiations with the violently temperamental Yaks go disastrously until Blueblood takes over the task. At that switch, Blueblood's dealings with the Yaks are handled with masterful skill and Shining comes to accept that despite Blueblood's faults, he has his good qualities worth respecting. With the mission successful, the stallions reconcile as Blueblood joins Shining on the march home considering he has filled the palanquin with gifts for Shining's wife.: Jeremy Whitley (story); Tony Fleecs (art); Tony Fleecs, Sara Richard (cover artist)
27	Pinkie Pie and Granny Smith	April 6, 2016	—
Pinkie offers to help Granny Smith when she breaks her hip during cider season since she might be related to the Apples. She cannot buck out any apples, so offers to take Granny Smith to do some groceries instead, much to Granny's dismay. Granny continues to be stubborn the whole trip, but Pinkie tries to make the situation easier. Granny then blames Pinkie when some cherries go missing. Realizing that Pinkie will simply not go away, Granny gives in to her help and they come across Sweet Apple Acres' very first apple tree. AJ decides that Granny has had enough of Pinkie and sends her away. At the Ponyville retirement village, Granny notices an old pony socializing with an annoying friend and realizes how badly she treated Pinkie. Granny apologizes to Pinkie, knowing she was trying to help and Pinkie readily accepts the apology.: Christian Rice (story); Agnes Garbowska (art)
28	Princess Luna and the Cutie Mark Crusaders	May 4, 2016	—
A number of fillies and colts, including the Cutie Mark Crusaders, are invited to a sleepover at the Royal Palace in Canterlot. Unfortunately, Princess Celestia is called away to handle a diplomatic crisis and Princess Luna is pressed to substitute for her as host. Although unsure about dealing with children, she is warmly welcomed by them and the Crusaders assist her with the activities. Unfortunately, one filly, Thestra, is bullied by two others and runs away into the palace interior. Princess Luna and the Crusaders find her and Thestra confesses that she is unsure about her recently earned cutie mark, which is a macabre skull and crossbones. They are then put upon by a mirrorca, an aggressive flying monster whose reflective skin deflects magic blasts. However, Thestra's special talent allows her to make any living being transparent except for its skeletal structure; when she uses this skill on the mirrorca, Luna is able to defeat it. Luna and the Crusaders hail Thestra as a hero and make several suggestions for her talent's practical applications.: Jeremy Whitley (story); Jay P. Fosgitt (art)
	My Little Pony: Friends Forever, Vol. 7	October 4, 2016	978-1631407079
Collection of Issues 25 through 28 of the "Friends Forever" series.
29	Rarity and Maud Pie	June 8, 2016	—
Rarity meets with Maud at a rock convention where they learn that a series of caves beneath the Crystal Mountain range has recently been uncovered. Rarity convinces Maud to explore them, but Buried Treasure, a rock scientist student who has tried to take credit for every rock discovery Maud has made, challenges them to find the caves before she does. Rarity convinces Maud to go along with it and she complies. Along the way, Rarity tells Maud to try and express herself more, though Maud claims she does. Once they make it inside the caves, Buried Treasure destroys a bridge over a large chasm, separating them. Rarity accidentally reads Maud's diary and discovers that Maud does indeed express herself more than what she let on. Maud manages to find a shortcut to the caves and they beat Buried Treasure. Rarity and Maud thank each other for helping one another and Maud sits down with her diary to talk to the rocks.: Ted Anderson (story); Brenda Hickey (art)
30	Twilight Sparkle and Princess Cadance	June 29, 2016	—
Twilight visits Cadance in the Crystal Empire for the official dedication of the Court of the Crystal Princess. During the visit, Cadance starts to lose her self-confidence as she believes that she doesn't get as much as respect as a princess like Twilight, Celestia, or Luna and it begins to cause the Crystal Heart to lose power. On the day of the court's dedication, Twilight convinces Cadance that the Crystal Ponies don't look up to her because of her looks, but because she is thoughtful, accepting, and accessible of them, and that her personality inspires them in her own special way. Her spirits lifted, Cadance dedicates the court to the entire Crystal Empire and the Crystal Heart regains its full power.: Christina Rice (story); Agnes Garbowska (art)
31	Rainbow Dash and Little Strongheart	August 17, 2016	—
While out flying with Fluttershy and Tank, Rainbow notices a smoke signal in the shape of her cutie mark and leaves to investigate. It was sent by Little Strongheart, who has called her to help stop a snowstorm that is threatening the crops on the buffalo lands. Chief Thunderhooves tells them the story of the Rainbow Crow, who once brought the sun's warmth to the lands at the cost of becoming soot-black and losing its ability to sing. The buffalo have a ritual to bring back the warmth by burning the feathers it left behind, but they have used their last one. Thunderhooves sends Rainbow to get some more, with Strongheart leading the way. As they travel, they argue over the value of Strongheart's traditions versus Rainbow's direct approach to solving problems. Rainbow flies up to the Rainbow Crow's nest, only to find that she has lost a necklace she was supposed to offer in tribute, but the Rainbow Crow gives her some of its feathers in exchange for a hair from her mane. On the way back, Rainbow offers to talk to Princess Celestia about adjusting the sun, but Strongheart explains that the buffalo traditions help the tribe stay connected to its past. They watch as the feather-burning ceremony creates a spectacular light show.: Tony Fleecs (story); Tony Fleecs, Sara Richard, Heather Breckel (art); Tony Fleecs, Sara Richard (cover)
32	Fluttershy and Daring Do	September 21, 2016	—
Fluttershy's plan to spend a quiet week at home is ruined by the arrival of Daring Do, who needs her animal expertise to help find the legendary lost treasure of Queen Parabola. The key to locating it is the rare Map Spider, but Daring says she is allergic to them. Fluttershy finds one at the bottom of a deep pit in a cavern, but surfaces to find Daring fighting with a gang of thugs led by Dr. Caballeron. He escapes with all the Map Spiders in the cavern except for the one Fluttershy has found. She and Daring use it to find Parabola's castle, but are captured by Ahuizotl, tied up, and dropped into a bottomless pit. Daring admits to Fluttershy that she is not allergic to spiders, only afraid of them, and thanks Fluttershy for the bravery she has shown throughout the expedition. Daring overcomes her fear and allows the Map Spider to crawl over her and untie them, and the two ambush Ahuizotl, Caballeron, and the thugs. Daring collapses a stone column on top of Ahuizotl, and Fluttershy releases the Map Spiders to scare off Caballeron and the thugs so the two mares can find the treasure.: Ted Anderson (story); Jay Fosgitt, Heather Breckel (art); Tony Fleecs, Jay Fosgitt (cover)
33	Applejack and Cherry Jubilee	October 12, 2016	—
Applejack volunteers to help at Cherry Jubilee's ranch in Dodge Junction after most of the crew falls ill. The troupe of a traveling Wild West show is also sick, and Applejack offers to let them set up camp so they can recover. When she tells Cherry that performer Buffalo Bull is among them, Cherry becomes furious and orders his co-star Calamity Mane to get the troupe off the ranch. Applejack persuades Cherry to let them stay the night, but Cherry refuses to explain her anger. That night, Calamity takes Applejack to see Bull, who has recognized Cherry from her yelling and becomes angry as well. The next morning, Applejack checks old newspapers at the local library and races back to confront Cherry - who had previously performed with Bull as Calamity Mane. She had left the ranch on which she grew up in order to go on the road with him, and the two found success and love together. When he proposed marriage in Dodge Junction, though, she panicked and fled, eventually settling down after Bull left her there. She is bitter because he found another mare to take the "Calamity Mane" identity, but Applejack points out that she might not have built a life for herself if he had not proposed and she had not run off. Cherry storms into Bull's wagon to tell him off, but softens as he begins to reminisce about their time together. The two forgive each other, and once the troupe has recovered, she makes a guest appearance at their show.: Christina Rice (story); Tony Fleecs, Heather Breckel (art); Tony Fleecs, Sara Richard, Trish Forstner (cover)
	My Little Pony: Friends Forever, Vol. 8	February 28, 2017	978-1631408397
Collection of Issues 29 through 33 of the "Friends Forever" series.
34	Pinkie Pie and Cheese Sandwich	November 23, 2016	—
A family once built a house, had it enchanted with a protection spell, and lived happily there for many years. Eventually, though, the ponies all moved out and the house was left empty. In the present, Pinkie Pie flees from the house, which has grown legs and is now moving on its own. She becomes trapped inside and finds Cheese Sandwich and several foals here as well; they were captured while Cheese was throwing a birthday party for them. Pinkie decides to keep the party going and, noticing that the house reacts positively to the ponies' fun, theorizes that they can party their way out. The plan fails, and the house heads for Ponyville once Pinkie says that they may need a bigger crowd. She finds a photo album filled with pictures of the original family's parties and realizes that the house misses them and has come to life in search of new ones thanks to the protection spell. She and Cheese strike a deal with the house to turn it into an endless traveling party, as long as it lets ponies leave whenever they want.: Thom Zahler (story); Agnes Garbowska, Lauren Perry (art); Tony Fleecs, Agnes Garbowska, Jenn Blake (cover)
35	Twilight Sparkle and Starlight Glimmer	December 14, 2016	—
Even though Starlight Glimmer has just done two friendship lessons for Twilight Sparkle, Twilight recruits her to help sort the books in the library at the Castle of the Two Sisters as another one. As they, Spike, and Owlowiscious start on the job, strange vines begin to blow dust throughout the library. Twilight and Starlight get into a heated argument, while Spike finds a picture of the vines in a book and learns that they create and feed on hostility. He races back to Twilight and Starlight with the book to keep the vines from stealing it, but they merge into a giant plant monster. Starlight temporarily transforms herself, Spike, and Owlowiscious to giant size to fight it off and buy time. Twilight finds and casts a spell that combines and focuses the magic between herself and Starlight, allowing the four to defeat the monster. The book was written by Star Swirl the Bearded, and the monster - a Squirm-Spore - had been trying to destroy the spell. When Star Swirl first encountered it, he had to cooperate with a manticore to stop it and nullify its hostility-causing effects. Starlight resolves to try harder to work with other ponies, and Twilight agrees not to put so much pressure on her about friendship lessons.: Rob Anderson (story); Jay Fosgitt, Heather Breckel (art); Tony Fleecs, Jay Fosgitt, Nidhi Chanani (cover)
36	Rainbow Dash and Soarin'	January 25, 2017	—
As the Mane Six prepare to take time off for the first snow of winter, Spitfire arrives in Ponyville with a mission for Rainbow Dash to track down Soarin'. Troubled over his recent difficulty in Wonderbolt performances, he has gone to a distant mountain outpost in order to prove to himself that he still deserves his spot on the team. The outpost is used for delivery runs of a rare medicinal plant, and the weather makes flying extremely risky. Just after Rainbow arrives, Soarin' returns from a delivery and crashes into the trees; he is annoyed that Spitfire did not come for him herself. The next morning, he does an early-morning run, intent on mastering the mountain, and returns just before the weather worsens and a rush order comes in. Rainbow and Soarin' volunteer for the job, and as they fight through the blizzards, Soarin' admits that his mistakes make him feel as if he has wasted all the hard work and practice he put in to become a Wonderbolt. Rainbow reassures him that the team would not be the same without him, and they finish the run once the weather clears. Returning to the outpost, they are surprised to find Spitfire waiting for them. Soarin' forgives her for the way she has treated him in the past, and all three enjoy a peaceful flight before starting for home.: Christina Rice (story); Tony Fleecs, Heather Breckel (art); Tony Fleecs, Sara Richard, Low Zi Rong (cover)
37	Rarity and Trixie	February 15, 2017	—
During a weekend visit to Manehattan, Rarity is asked to design costumes for Sapphire Shores' latest show while Sweetie Belle spends time with Babs Seed. Rarity finds the venue in a state of chaos, due to the show being scaled up for a larger-than-expected crowd, and Sapphire wants her to work with Trixie, who is in charge of special effects. Trixie insists that she has changed her ways from the first two times she visited Ponyville, and Rarity reluctantly agrees to work with her. The two concentrate only on their respective areas at first, but the lack of communication leads to Sapphire's dress catching fire during a rehearsal. Sapphire is furious with Trixie, but Rarity stands up for her and admits fault in not listening to her opinions. The two unicorns work all night to redesign the costumes and effects. The show is a smash success, and Rarity parts on good terms with Trixie before picking Sweetie up for the trip home.: Jeremy Whitley (story); Agnes Garbowska, Heather Breckel (art); Tony Fleecs, Agnes Garbowska, Melody Often (cover)
38	Princess Celestia and Princess Luna	April 19, 2017	—
Celestia and Luna have a chance to participate in the Sisterhooves Social, which they have wanted to do for years, but must take care of a long list of chores first. As they race to complete the tasks, their contrasting personalities and the stress of working long hours causes them to get on each other's nerves. They have two potions made and infused into berries, one to remove their powers so they can compete fairly, the other to restore those powers after the Social. The inhibitor makes them unusually testy due to spices that were slipped into it without their knowledge, and they become so intent on competing that they forget to feed their pets, Philomena and Tiberius. During the Social, they repeatedly try to humiliate each other in the events and eventually switch partners with Rarity and Sweetie Belle. They are interrupted by Philomena and Tiberius, who have eaten the berries with the restorer and are now giant-size. Celestia and Luna work together to bring their pets under control and take Rarity's advice to heart, resolving to embrace each other's differences instead of competing over them.: Andy Price (story); Andy Price, Heather Breckel (art); Andy Price, Tony Fleecs, Sara Richard, Diana Leto (cover)
	My Little Pony: Friends Forever, Vol. 9	July 11, 2017	978-1631409189
Collection of Issues 34 through 38 of the "Friends Forever" series.
	My Little Pony: Friends Forever Omnibus, Vol. 3	January 9, 2018	978-1684050505
Collection of Issues 25 through 38 of the "Friends Forever" series.

== My Little Pony: FIENDship is Magic (April 2015) ==
This is a list of My Little Pony: FIENDship is Magic issues.

No.	Title	United States release date	United States ISBN
01	Sombra	April 1, 2015	—
Cadance and Twilight find a diary left behind by Sombra. They learn he was found as an orphan colt by the Crystal Empire, and though teased by other foals and fillies, was friended by a filly named Radiant Hope. During their time together, they both gazed on the Crystal Heart - Radiant saw herself as a princess, while Sombra saw himself become evil; Princess Amore, the leader of the Crystal Empire at the time, told him to not worry too much about the vision. The two planned to go to the Crystal Faire together, but on the day of the Faire, Sombra's body was unable to move, Radiant Hope staying by his side. They tried to do this for several more years, but the force that held his body became stronger, and Radiant Hope discovered her talent of restorative magic and prevented Sombra from dying. When Radiant Hope is offered an opportunity to study under Princesses Celestia and Luna, Sombra knew that the vision was coming true. He ran away, but came across a strange crystal form in the wilderness that revealed he was a creation of umbrum forces waiting beneath the palace, and that the Crystal Heart was trying to destroy him. Recognizing his true nature, Sombra tries to destroy the crystal but Amore stops him. In his anger, he turns her into crystal and shatters her, which Radiant Hope cannot undo. Sombra subsequently took over the Crystal Empire, while Radiant Hope warned the princesses about his turn, eventually sealing his fate. In the present, after Twilight and Cadance leave the study, Sombra's disembodied horn makes its way down the staircase, revealing to still contain Sombra's essence.: Jeremy Whitley (story); Brenda Hickey (art); Heather Breckel (colorist); Bobby Curnow (editor); Neil Uyetake (lettering)
02	Tirek	April 8, 2015	—
Prince Tirek goes against his father, King Vorak, and visits the hermit Sendak the Elder, despite his brother Scorpan tagging along. Sendak shows that he has returned from Equestria with a unicorn to study, planning on how to use the unicorn magic for himself. Sendak warns that he knows Tirek has a thirst for power, but his young, untamed magic would be too dangerous to use on the unicorn. Tirek and Scorpan return before their parents can find out, though Vorak is suspicious that Tirek has visited Sendak and tells him not to do it again. Tirek sneaks out alone that night to Sendak, and after restraining the hermit, attempts to drain the magic from the unicorn. As Sendak warned, Tirek's magic causes a massive explosion that collapses Sendak's home. Tirek flees without stopping to help. The next morning, Tirek is brought to Vorak, who learned of the destruction of Sendak's place, and while Sendak is alive, Vorak plans to send him to work the mines for the rest of his life, and arranged a delegation to Equestria to return the unicorn to Princess Celestia. Tirek admits no knowledge of the events of the previous night, but Vorak senses that Tirek has a thirst for power. Later, Tirek begins to plot on how he will dispose his father and take over Equestria.: Christina Rice (story); Tony Fleecs (art); Heather Breckel (colorist); Bobby Curnow (editor); Neil Uyetake (lettering)
03	Sirens	April 15, 2015	—
(See My Little Pony: Equestria Girls#Comics.)
04	The Dream Team (Nightmare Moon)	April 22, 2015	—
Shortly after her banishment to the moon by Princess Celestia, Nightmare Moon comes across the nyx, creatures that can enter and manipulate the dreams of ponies to help them rest easier. Feigning friendship with Doran, one of the nyx, Nightmare Moon learns how to do this herself and soon converts the nyx to become her nightmare forces. She tries to enter Celestia's dreams but the Princess' mind is well-protected. Instead, Nightmare Moon attempts to sway the population via dreams to make them think Celestia is a tyrant. Celestia is able to dispel this, but weakens her mind's defenses, allowing Nightmare Moon to enter her mind. There, Nightmare Moon plays on Celestia's emotions, but after showing her Princess Luna trapped and alone, Celestia is emboldened by the love for her sister and ejects Nightmare Moon from her mind. The nightmare forces claim they cannot return Nightmare Moon to Celestia's mind, though secretly vow to protect the princess. Nightmare Moon continues to plot how to use her nightmare powers to her benefit.: Heather Nuhfer (story); Tony Fleecs (art); Heather Breckel (colorist); Bobby Curnow (editor); Neil Uyetake (lettering)
05	The Many Tales of Queen Chrysalis (Queen Chrysalis)	April 29, 2015	—
The Mane 6 visit the imprisoned Queen Chrysalis after learning she has become depressed and lethargic. They discuss her involvement with Equestria's past, recounting her overthrow of the pegasus city of Timbucktu and the unicorn civilization of Trot. Defeated by Princess Celestia and imprisoned in a volcano, she outwitted a passing dragon in order to escape with her minions. When the Mane 6 reach her cell, she offers to tell the story of her origin in exchange for a book. Ignoring the others' warnings, Twilight enters the cell with the book, only to find that this Chrysalis is actually a minion in disguise. The real Chrysalis lunges from the shadows and explains that she and her species were born from a mutated carnivorous tree that grew in a magic swamp; they broke loose when Star Swirl the Bearded drove a nail into the tree to hang up a warning sign. As the prison guards and Twilight's friends rush to her aid, Chrysalis and her minions overpower them and escape from the prison.: Katie Cook (story); Andy Price (art); Heather Breckel (colorist); Bobby Curnow (editor); Neil Uyetake (lettering)
	My Little Pony: FIENDship is Magic	June 17, 2015	978-1631403392
Collection of Issues 1 through 5 of the "FIENDship is Magic" series.

== My Little Pony: Legends of Magic (April 2017–March 2018) ==
This is a list of My Little Pony: Legends of Magic issues.

No.	Title	United States release date	United States ISBN
01	Star Swirl the Bearded	April 12, 2017	—
Princess Celestia gives Sunburst access to a study used by her mentor, Star Swirl the Bearded, so he can research the history of Equestria. He finds a book written by Star Swirl, describing his tutelage of Celestia and Princess Luna when they were younger. Jealous of Celestia's faster progress, Luna steals a spellbook and uses it to create a dimensional portal to a parallel world. A force pulls her through, accompanied by a voice promising to make her stronger than Celestia, and the portal closes. Once Star Swirl re-opens it, Celestia races in ahead of him and rescues Luna from a group of rock creatures who are trying to turn her into Nightmare Moon. The creatures merge into a giant monster, and Star Swirl arrives to battle it so the sisters can return to the portal. All three escape to Equestria, and Celestia apologizes to Luna for making fun of her instead of watching out for her. Sunburst gives the book to Celestia and Luna so they can remember Star Swirl's old lesson on the importance of compassion in a leader. He then reaches for a different title, Rockhoof and the Mighty Helm.: Jeremy Whitley (story); Brenda Hickey, Heather Breckel (art); Brenda Hickey, Zachary Sterling, Derek Charm (cover)
02	Rockhoof and the Mighty Helm	May 17, 2017	—
Sunburst finds a book written by Star Swirl the Bearded about Rockhoof, an earth pony who saved a town from a volcanic eruption by digging a trench to divert the lava. The book tells the story of what happened after this event, and Princess Luna asks Sunburst to read it to her. Rockhoof is invited to join the "Mighty Helm", a team of ponies tasked with protecting the town. He has trained for years in the hope of joining them, and he carries this dedication into his formal duties at first. However, he spends night after night celebrating with the other members, and he steadily falls out of shape. When the volcano threatens to erupt again, Helm captain Steela Oresdotter sends Rockhoof and two other ponies to investigate. They find a crab-like creature called a Cherufe at the peak, muttering and throwing fireballs; Rockhoof tries to fight, but he is no match for the Cherufe and all three return to the town. Steela relieves Rockhoof of duty for angering the Cherufe, and he resumes his old training regimen on his own. Once he gets back into shape, he and Steela climb the volcano again and find that the Cherufe always throws its fireballs at the same point within the crater. Rockhoof digs at this spot and unearths the creature's baby, which has been trying to make its way home from underground. The volcano settles down, and Rockhoof learns to take his work seriously but make time for occasional relaxation with friends. Luna asks Sunburst to tell her another story later, but he decides that he should perhaps read the next one by himself.: Jeremy Whitley (story); Brenda Hickey, Heather Breckel (art); Brenda Hickey, Zachary Sterling, Caytlin Vilbrandt (cover)
03	Mistmane	June 7, 2017	—
After reading the tale of Rockhoof to Princess Luna, Sunburst decides to read the next story to himself. The story in question is about Mistmane, a unicorn who gave up her legendary beauty to save her friend. Directed by the book, Sunburst visits the gardens of Canterlot Castle to read about her later adventures in old age. While traveling with several animals, Mistmane discovers that something is interfering with the construction of Canterlot Castle by damaging the crew's equipment and dismantling their work. She persuades the crew to take the day off and let her stay for the night, promising to find the cause. That night, she encounters a young Princess Luna and the two discover that the local animals are trying to tear down the castle. Luna tries to confront them directly, but Mistmane suggests that she observe their body language instead. The two learn that the animals are afraid of losing their homes to the castle construction. With their help, Luna re-designs the castle to accommodate their concerns, unaware that Mistmane has already left, and Celestia and Star Swirl approve the plans the next morning. Much later, after the castle is completed, Star Swirl sees a figure walking in the gardens and believes it to be Mistmane, but the figure suddenly disappears before he can be sure. In the present, Sunburst thinks he sees Mistmane in the gardens, but it turns out to be a group of animals. Reminding himself that Mistmane is only a legend, he returns to the library to read another story, Flash Magnus and the Royal Legion.: Jeremy Whitley (story); Brenda Hickey, Heather Breckel (art); Brenda Hickey, Zachary Sterling, Paul Abtruse/Eddy Swan (covers)
04	Flash Magnus and the Royal Legion	July 5, 2017	—
Sunburst's studies are interrupted by the arrival of Starlight Glimmer, who is angry at him for not coming to see her during her visit to Canterlot. She persuades him to read her the story of Flash Magnus, a pegasus who once stopped a dragon attack using only his shield, and he goes to Star Swirl's books to tell of his later exploits. Flash is a member of the Royal Legion, a pegasus brigade tasked with protecting Cloudsdale. His commander, Captain Ironhead, brings news that an accident at the weather factory has created a massive storm that is currently drifting over griffon territory toward the city. Ironhead and his four fastest soldiers, including Flash, depart to stop the storm but are intercepted by the griffon Blackbeak, who accuses the pegasi of creating it as a weapon and insists that the griffons will stop it themselves. Ironhead orders his team to retreat back over the border, but Flash defies him and leads the other three in a rescue effort to save the young griffons in a village about to be hit by the storm. When the griffons' efforts prove futile, Ironhead and his troops work together to break up the storm. Flash and his colleagues are honored for their bravery, and Flash becomes a hero to the griffons. Sunburst explains that this incident led to pegasi and griffons taking flight training together. Not entirely convinced of the accuracy of Star Swirl's account, Starlight decides to do a little research of her own once she returns to Ponyville. Sunburst offers to take her to dinner as a way of making up for ignoring her, and she happily accepts.: Jeremy Whitley (story); Brenda Hickey, Heather Breckel (art); Brenda Hickey, Zachary Sterling, Caytlin Vilbrandt (cover)
05	The Legend of Somnambula and the Snake	September 6, 2017	—
While walking through Canterlot Castle with a book from Star Swirl's study, Sunburst runs into Pinkie Pie, who is setting up a party for Princess Luna's pet opossum Tiberius. She recognizes the title - The Legend of Somnambula and the Snake - and says that the story is one of her favorites. She asks Sunburst to read it to her, but does it herself after he refuses to do voices for the characters. Somnambula, a pegasus, had become famous for saving Prince Hisan, the son of a kingdom's ruler, from an evil Sphinx. Years later, Hisan asks for her help in dealing with an enormous snake, big enough to eat his palace. It swallows the last of Hisan's guards, then Somnambula herself when she tries to reason with it. Leaving a piece of her luminous glopaz necklace inside the mouth, she ventures deeper into the snake's gut and finds several groups of survivors. From their successive descriptions of its size, she realizes that it has been growing. She gives each group a piece of glopaz and sends them toward the mouth, then finds a bitter old wizard at the tail. He explains that he had tried to stop an ordinary snake from eating his potion ingredients by putting a curse on a stone; when the snake swallowed this, it began to grow out of all proportion and swallowed him. Somnambula finds the stone, brings the wizard up to the mouth, and levers the snake's jaws open wide enough to throw the stone out and let everypony escape unharmed. The snake shrinks back to normal size, and Hisan learns to trust Somnambula and never give up hope in a dire situation. After Pinkie finishes the story and goes on her way, Sunburst decides to read the next story by himself once his nerves have settled down and selects another book, Mage Meadowbrook and the Abandoned City.: Jeremy Whitley (story); Brenda Hickey, Heather Breckel (art); Brenda Hickey, Zachary Sterling, Caytlin Vilbrandt (cover)
06	Mage Meadowbrook and the Abandoned City	September 27, 2017	—
Sunburst leaves Canterlot to return to the Crystal Empire, taking some of Star Swirl's books with him. During the trip, he settles down to read about the famous healer Mage Meadowbrook and her adventures after curing an epidemic of swamp fever in her home village. While traveling throughout Equestria to help ailing ponies, Meadowbrook enters the town of Mareidian only to find it seemingly empty. She takes shelter from a storm at an inn, but discovers a horde of shambling zombie ponies inside and flees into the streets again. Grabbing her bag of supplies, she flees to a frog-infested barn that houses the town's food supply. Meadowbrook realizes that a poisonous secretion from the frogs' skin, intended to deter predators, has contaminated the food and caused the zombie affliction. She brews a potion using the secretion, lures the zombies into the barn, and douses them with the potion to return them to normal. As Sunburst's train reaches the Crystal Empire, he notices a book set with Star Swirl's cutie mark in his luggage. Upon reading a passage about the virtues represented by the ponies of legend, Sunburst flies into a panic and decides that he needs to see Twilight Sparkle in Canterlot.: Jeremy Whitley (story); Brenda Hickey, Heather Breckel (art); Brenda Hickey, Zachary Sterling, Abigail Starling (cover)
	My Little Pony: Legends of Magic, Vol. 1	November 21, 2017	978-1684050598
Collection of Issues 1 through 6 of the "Legends of Magic" series.
07	TBA	October 18, 2017	—
Back in the Crystal Empire, Sunburst is going over all his research when he receives a knock at the door; opening it, he finds that a new book has been left on his doorstep. The account proves to have been written by Stygian, a unicorn scholar whose interests included the sea-life of Equestria. One day as he traversed a beach near to his home, he encountered the Dazzlings (antagonists of My Little Pony: Equestria Girls – Rainbow Rocks), who asked him to take them to his village. Gaining a sense of their villainous intentions he departs, and is soon attending to errands for an elderly pony in the village. Later that night, Stygian goes out searching for the pony he was assisting and the finds that the town is deserted, all the inhabitants having been drawn to a concert and ensnared by the Dazzlings' music. Blaming himself for not warning the townsponies, he decides that-as he cannot defeat the invaders himself-he needs to seek out help. To that end, he sets out to find the most legendary ponies in Equestria, and begins by traveling to the island home of Rockhoof.: Jeremy Whitley (story); Tony Fleecs, Heather Breckel (art); Tony Fleecs, Brenda Hickey, Nicoletta Baldari (cover)
08	TBA	November 15, 2017	—
Stygian meets Rockhoof and attempts to recruit him to help against the Sirens, but the heroic pony is occupied with his own village's difficulties. The village relies on magical filter fish to keep its drinking water clean, but the river in which the fish travel is being menaced by lumber bears that even the Mighty Helm cannot challenge lightly. Stygian proposes a plan to divert the local river away from the forest occupied by the bears, allowing the Mighty Helm to deal with the beasts without having to defend the fish at the same time. Rockhoof digs a channel with Stygian's help, while Captain Steela Oresdotter of the Mighty Helm handles the lumber bears. The plan succeeds; Rockhoof nearly drowns in the diverted river, but Stygian saves him just in time. Grateful to Stygian, Rockhoof agrees to join his quest, and the pair set out to gain the aid of Mage Meadowbrook. However, upon arriving in her home, the pair are attacked by unusually aggressive animals. Meadowbrook saves them by luring the animals into a trap, and a comment by Stygian gives her a clue as to the cause of their aggression. Only the plant-eating creatures have been affected, leading her to conclude that a newly arrived fungus is responsible. As she begins to brew an antidote, the affected creatures begin to close in on the trio.: Jeremy Whitley (story); Tony Fleecs, Heather Breckel (art); Tony Fleecs, Brenda Hickey, Jennifer Hermandez (cover)
09	TBA	December 27, 2017	—
Stygian and Rockhoof work to keep the infected animals of Hayseed Swamp out while Meadowbrook develops a cure for their condition. Rockhoof's strength allows him to hold off the attackers, until Stygian's efforts to subdue them with Meadowbrook's concoctions cause some of the animals to become too strong. Luckily, Meadowbrook completes her antidote and administers it to the creatures, restoring them to their usual peaceful natures. Grateful for the help of her new friends, Meadowbrook joins in their expedition. The trio then set out in search of Flash Magnus, hoping that his speed will be an asset in the battle with the Sirens. They eventually arrive at the training camp of the Cloudsdale Royal Legion, only to learn that war with the dragons is imminent and that Flash Magnus is at the front.: Jeremy Whitley (story); Tony Fleecs, Heather Breckel (art); Tony Fleecs, Brenda Hickey, Monica "Hollulu" Grover (cover)
10	TBA	January 24, 2018	—
Stygian's party interrupts a confrontation between Flash Magnus and one of the invading dragons, and Rockhoof is able to convince Flash to come down and listen to them. While Stygian argues with the Pegasus, Meadowbrook realizes that a number of the dragons are ill. She quickly diagnoses their condition and provides a treatment, allowing the dragons to return home and preventing war between them and the Pegasi. Flash Magnus is left free to join the party, which Stygian reveals is meant to be composed of ponies representing various crucial elements. The party makes its way into a desert region where they are attacked by what appear to be mummy ponies, but the behavior of the creatures seems off. Somnambula then arrives and reveals that the majority of the mummies are in fact illusions produced by a cursed object. Working together, the five ponies are able to destroy the artifact and free its victim, Prince Hisan, and Somnambula eagerly joins the group. Unbeknownst to them, their next intended recruit-Mistmane-has come under attack from her own greenhouse plants.: Jeremy Whitley (story); Tony Fleecs, Heather Breckel (art); Tony Fleecs, Brenda Hickey, Low Zi Rong (cover)
11	TBA	February 28, 2018	—
Searching for Mistmane, Stygian and the legendary ponies assembled thus far reach her greenhouse, which they discover is locked from the inside. The members of the group attempt various means of breaking in, only to find that Mistmane's plants are actively attempting to keep them out. Meadowbrook manages to trick the plants into allowing them access by offering them a growth potion, which works until an oblivious Flash Sentry mentions the object of their search. They then locate Mistmane and "rescue" her-only to learn that the plants were not attempting to harm her at all, but rather wished her not to leave. With the guidance of Mistmane, the group then sets out to recruit the final member of their group: Star Swirl the Bearded. Finding him in Canterlot, Stygian is overawed to meet his idol, and the two quickly bond over common interests. After revealing the situation of his home village, Stygian acquaints Star Swirl with his new teammates.: Jeremy Whitley (story); Tony Fleecs, Heather Breckel (art); Tony Fleecs, Brenda Hickey (cover)
12	TBA	March 28, 2018	—
Having joined the other legendary ponies, Star Swirl bids farewell to Princesses Celestia and Luna before meeting his teammates at the Castle of the Two Sisters. He becomes acquainted with the others as they make their way to Stygian's village, though the scholarly unicorn begins to feel that the group dynamic has changed. When Stygian attempts to propose a means of weakening and then reasoning with the Sirens, Star Swirl butts in with his own plan. He feels that he and the other five heroes have the power to deal with the threat, and seems to regard the villains as irredeemable. Stygian reluctantly agrees to Star Swirl's plan to banish the Sirens, and remains on the sidelines while they engage the enemy. After Star Swirl sends them to another dimension (leading into the events of Rainbow Rocks) Stygian resolves to find his own way of becoming a hero. Back in the present, Sunburst tracks down Stygian and refutes his assertions that he wasn't a hero, given all that he did to bring the Pillars of Old Equestria together to save his homeland. Grateful, Stygian offers Sunburst the chance to read his second journal, while Sunburst questions whether or not Equestria's greatest villain may not be Star Swirl himself due to his failure to comprehend friendship.: Jeremy Whitley (story); Tony Fleecs, Heather Breckel (art); Tony Fleecs, Brenda Hickey (cover)
	My Little Pony: Legends of Magic, Vol. 2	May 22, 2018	978-1684051588
Collection of Issues 7 through 12 of the "Legends of Magic" series.

== My Little Pony: The Movie Prequel (June–September 2017) ==
This is a list of My Little Pony: The Movie Prequel issues.

No.	Title	United States release date	United States ISBN
01	The Storm King	June 28, 2017	—
The Storm King recounts his latest triumph, the looting of the cat kingdom of Abyssinia. Instead of overthrowing its king and queen, he simply takes everything of value by force, with an eye toward any magical items. Among the hoard is the Misfortune Malachite, a necklace that carries great power but also curses its owner to suffer eventual ruin. The Storm King ignores the Abyssinian rulers' warning and departs, gloating to his second-in-command Strife that he has succeeded in his conquests because he does not let the idea of friendship distract him from his goals. Strife later betrays the Storm King to a crew of parrot sky pirates and sabotages the ship to make pursuit impossible, explaining that he has his own goals to pursue.: Ted Anderson (story); Neil Uyetake (lettering); Andy Price, Heather Breckel (art); Andy Price, Tony Fleecs, Kaori Matsuo (cover)
02	Captain Celaeno and the Pirates	July 26, 2017	—
Two moons prior to the events of issue #1, the sky pirates and their captain, Celaeno, loot one of the Storm King's ships but find its cargo to be of low value. Celaeno knows that her fleet needs supplies and repairs, but she is unwilling to risk the safety of her crew on bigger heists. They receive a message from Strife, informing them of his plans to sabotage the Storm King's vessels after the raid on Abyssinia. Celaeno and her crew plunder the fleet and take Strife with them, but find two Abyssinian stowaways on one of their ships. She offers them a position on the crew, surprising Strife with her generosity. The Storm King attacks and captures the pirates, having quickly repaired his ship, and launches Strife overboard. He offers Celaeno a chance to join him, but she refuses as the job would require her to abandon her crew; instead, he forces all of them to work for him as cargo haulers. One of Celaeno's ships breaks away, piloted by the stowaways and carrying the Malachite.: Ted Anderson (story); Andy Price (art); Andy Price, Tony Fleecs, Kaori Matsuo (cover)
03	Capper of Abyssinia	August 23, 2017	—
The two Abyssinian stowaways, Capper and Chummer, crash their stolen ship in the desert and find the Malachite in the wreckage. They take it with them, hoping to be able to trade it for supplies, and come across the crime-ridden settlement of Klugetown. The two had grown up on the streets of Abyssinia as orphans, stealing to survive and looking out for each other, and Chummer is eager to resume that life. Capper, however, wants stability and a chance for them to simply live as friends. Their street hustling attracts the attention of Verko, the crime boss of Klugetown, who offers to give them a fully stocked airship in exchange for the Malachite even though he knows about its curse. Adopting Verko's ruthless attitude, Chummer double-crosses Capper and Verko, steals the ship, and keeps the Malachite. Capper climbs aboard to fight Chummer, but he is knocked overboard as the ship catches fire. Verko tells Capper that Chummer broke both of them, to which Capper bitterly muses that Chummer was never his friend and walks off.: Ted Anderson (story); Andy Price (art); Andy Price, Tony Fleecs, Kaori Matsuo (cover)
04	Tempest of Equestria	September 6, 2017	—
Tempest Shadow, a unicorn unable to properly use magic due to her broken horn, finds the Malachite in the wreckage of Chummer's stolen ship. She takes it, evading an attempt by the Storm King's troops to recover it, and flees to Klugetown. There, she overhears rumors that the Storm King is on the hunt for any magical artifacts he can find; she also hears warnings from the Malachite itself to beware its power. She slips out of town as part of a caravan, then leaves its leader Rambler to deal with the Storm King's troops when they ambush it - only to come face to face with the Storm King himself. He offers to make her his second-in-command, heal her horn, and restore her magic in exchange for the Malachite. She accepts the deal and tells him of the magic contained within Equestria, and he destroys the Malachite in order to eliminate its curse as a possible distraction during his conquest.: Ted Anderson (story); Andy Price (art); Andy Price, Tony Fleecs, Kaori Matsuo (cover)
	My Little Pony: The Movie Prequel	August 29, 2017	978-1684051076
Collection of Issues 1 through 4 of "The Movie Prequel" series.

== My Little Pony: Ponyville Mysteries (May–September 2018) ==
This is a list of My Little Pony: Ponyville Mysteries issues.

No.	Title	United States release date	United States ISBN
01	My Little Pony: Ponyville Mysteries #1	May 30, 2018	—
The Cutie Mark Crusaders are volunteering at Ponyville Hospital when they overhear an altercation between Head Nurse Neightingale and Nurse Redheart. They learn that medical supplies have been stolen and that Neightingale is holding Redheart responsible, and offer to help her discover the true culprit. Their investigation leads to the discovery that Neightingale, Redheart, and Distemper the janitor are the only ones with keys to the supply closet from which the items have been stolen. Despite Redheart's vouching for Distemper's integrity, his refusal to cooperate with their investigation and an incident in which he helps a patient with some bandages he had on hand lead the Crusaders to suspect him. Neightingale suspends him on their recommendations, but another theft occurs the following day leading to Redheart's suspension as well. While visiting Fluttershy, however, the Crusaders learn that it is nesting season for the Equestrian social weaver bird, and between this and feathers seen near a small window in the supply closet deduce the truth. Redheart and Distemper are soon cleared, and Neightingale and the Crusaders both apologize for their rash actions. The Crusaders then decide to start a detective agency, and quickly receive their first clients in the form of several bowler ponies.: Christina Rice (story); Agnes Garbowska (art and cover A); Philip Murray (cover B)
02	My Little Pony: Ponyville Mysteries #2	June 20, 2018	—
The bowler ponies from the end of the previous issue-Jeff Letrotski and Walter-inform the Cutie Mark Crusaders that someone has been stealing all the pins from the Ponyville bowling alley. Not only are they unable to practice for an upcoming tournament, but Walter's chance to break the record of a pony named Kingpin is in jeopardy. After questioning the other team members, the Crusaders believe that a rival team may be behind the theft. However, visits to Cloudsdale, Canterlot, and Dodge Junction to interview those cities' teams leave them with no fresh clues as to motive or opportunity. At school the next day, the tired Crusaders notice that their classmates Snips and Snails are equally fatigued, just before Jeff arrives to report another bowling-pin theft. They visit the alley again and meet Kingpin, who says that although he is happy to see somepnony try to break his record, his grandson - Snips - thinks otherwise. The Crusaders discover that Snips stole the pins with Snails' help in order to keep Kingpin's record intact. With the mystery solved, the tournament goes on as planned and the alley is renamed in Kingpin's honor.
03	My Little Pony: Ponyville Mysteries #3	July 18, 2018	—
During a Filly Guide campout, Scootaloo's aunts Holiday and Lofty show the Cutie Mark Crusaders and their friends how to make Sumyums, a s'more-like treat involving prickly pears. Granny Smith interrupts with news of a fire at the Ponyville Retirement Village. The damage is soon contained, but rumors that it may have been deliberately set prompt the Crusaders to investigate the following day. They question Diamond Tiara, whose father Filthy Rich wants to put up a hotel on the site, and resident Sand Trap, who had criticized the Retirement Village in the past. Both deny any involvement in starting the fire, and the Crusaders question other residents but make no headway. Fire Streak, the town's fire chief, warns them not to enter the lucnchroom where the fire started, but they ignore him and sneak in during the night. There they find the remains of a campfire and residue of prickly pear and peanut butter. The next day, when Holiday and Lofty tell Scootaloo that Filly Guides used to make Sumyums using peanut butter, she realizes who is responsible. Pearly Stitch, a resident who had been a Filly Guide in her youth, admits to setting the fire to make Sumyums because she missed the taste of them. Fire Streak berates the Crusaders for risking their safety, but the residents thank them and Holiday and Lofty organize a "throwback" Filly Guide outing with Pearly as their guest.
04	My Little Pony: Ponyville Mysteries #4	August 29, 2018	—
On a visit to the Ponyville Day Spa with Rarity and Rainbow Dash, the Crusaders learn that the spring the spa gets its water from has apparently dried up. They head out into the Everfree Forest to investigate, and find the spring dammed with a pipeline leading away from it. The pipe apparently ends at Sweet Apple Acres, making it appear as though the Apple family is stealing the spring water for their own uses. Upon questioning the Apples, they learn that hybrid trees (like the apple-pear tree planted by Apple Bloom's parents in the episode "The Perfect Pear") require a large amount of water. Getting no answers from the Apples as to the water, the Crusaders talk the case over at Sugarcube Corner and inadvertently spread the news that the Apples are suspects in the case. This leads the townsponies to treat the Apples with suspicion, refusing to buy their products. The Crusaders discover that Flim and Flam are in town selling hybrid fruits, and another check of the pipeline reveals an additional buried section that leads to their tree. The brothers hurriedly leave town, the Apples' family name is cleared, and the water flow to the spa is restored.
05	My Little Pony: Ponyville Mysteries #5	September 26, 2018	—
	My Little Pony: Ponyville Mysteries	January 15, 2019	978-1684053933
Collection of Issues 1 through 5 of "Ponyville Mysteries."

== My Little Pony: Nightmare Knights (October 2018–March 2019) ==
This is a list of My Little Pony: Nightmare Knights issues.

No.	Title	United States release date	United States ISBN
01	My Little Pony: Nightmare Knights #1	October 10, 2018	—
02	My Little Pony: Nightmare Knights #2	November 21, 2018	—
03	My Little Pony: Nightmare Knights #3	December 12, 2018	—
04	My Little Pony: Nightmare Knights #4	January 16, 2019	—
05	My Little Pony: Nightmare Knights #5	March 13, 2019	—

== My Little Pony: Spirit of the Forest (May–August 2019) ==
This is a list of My Little Pony: Spirit of the Forest issues.

No.	Title	United States release date	United States ISBN
01	My Little Pony: Spirit of the Forest #1	May 29, 2019	—
02	My Little Pony: Spirit of the Forest #2	June 26, 2019	—
03	My Little Pony: Spirit of the Forest #3	August 14, 2019	—

== My Little Pony: Feats of Friendship (August–November 2019) ==
This is a list of My Little Pony: Feats of Friendship issues.

No.	Title	United States release date	United States ISBN
01	My Little Pony: Feats of Friendship #1	August 7, 2019	—
02	My Little Pony: Feats of Friendship #2	October 30, 2019	—
03	My Little Pony: Feats of Friendship #3	November 20, 2019	—

== My Little Pony: Generations (October 2021–February 2022) ==
This is a list of My Little Pony: Generations issues.

No.	Title	United States release date	United States ISBN
01	My Little Pony: Generations #1	October 20, 2021	—
02	My Little Pony: Generations #2	November 17, 2021	—
03	My Little Pony: Generations #3	December 22, 2021	—
04	My Little Pony: Generations #4	January 26, 2022	—
05	My Little Pony: Generations #5	February 9, 2022	—

== My Little Pony Classics Reimagined: Little Fillies (November 2022–February 2023) ==
This is a list of My Little Pony Classics Reimagined: Little Fillies issues.

No.	Title	United States release date	United States ISBN
01	My Little Pony Classics Reimagined: Little Fillies #1	November 9, 2022	—
02	My Little Pony Classics Reimagined: Little Fillies #2	December 14, 2022	—
03	My Little Pony Classics Reimagined: Little Fillies #3	January 11, 2023	—
04	My Little Pony Classics Reimagined: Little Fillies #4	February 8, 2023	—

== My Little Pony Classics Reimagined: The Unicorn of Odd (August 2023–December 2023) ==
This is a list of My Little Pony Classics Reimagined: The Unicorn of Odd issues.

No.	Title	United States release date	United States ISBN
01	My Little Pony Classics Reimagined: The Unicorn of Odd #1	August 23, 2023	—
02	My Little Pony Classics Reimagined: The Unicorn of Odd #2	October 11, 2023	—
03	My Little Pony Classics Reimagined: The Unicorn of Odd #3	November 8, 2023	—
04	My Little Pony Classics Reimagined: The Unicorn of Odd #4	December 27, 2023	—

== One-shots ==
This is a list of My Little Pony one-shots.

}}

No.	Title	United States release date	United States ISBN
	My Little Pony: Annual 2013	October 30, 2013	—
(See My Little Pony: Equestria Girls#Comics.)
	My Little Pony: Annual 2014	September 24, 2014	—
The Power Ponies stop three of Maretropolis' villains and send them to Balkham Asylum, earning the praise of the city. However, once the heroes have returned to their tower headquarters, private disagreements between them start to boil over, much to the dismay of their sidekick Humdrum. The captured villains ally themselves with two other inmates, Smudge and the Mane-iac, and a sixth – the fugitive Shadowmane – breaks them out of the asylum and joins the team as well. The Power Ponies' squabbles foil their attempts to stop the gang, and they are captured and their powers transferred to the gang. Humdrum frees the Power Ponies, who fear that they will be unable to stop the gang from ravaging Maretropolis in a crime spree. He tells them of a television show that teaches the strength of friendship and puts them through an intensive training course to help them become friends with each other again. When they go up against the gang, though, they are captured just as easily as before. Once they escape this trap, they rewire the power-transferring machine and trick the villains into distrusting each other. The villains, caught off guard by their own infighting, lose their stolen abilities to the Power Ponies and are quickly subdued and arrested. The Power Ponies ask Humdrum about the show that gave him the idea about friendship, and at the tower, he shows them an episode of the animated series My Little Donkey. In a short side story, the Mane-iac escapes from prison and finds her old lair and hair-dryer superweapon in ruins. Amid the rubble, she unearths a magic mirror that transports her to the human world seen in the Equestria Girls film. She retains her pony form in this world and soon encounters her human counterpart; the two do not recognize each other at first and fight briefly, but they soon realize that they are identical except for the species difference. They reminisce over their past criminal schemes and agree that they can work together in their separate worlds to achieve their evil goals. After Pony Mane-iac returns to her own world, this entire story is revealed to be part of a comic book that Human Rainbow Dash is reading; she is puzzled over the existence of Pony Mane-iac.: Ted Anderson (story); Ben Bates (art & coloring); Neil Uyetake (lettering); Bobby Curnow (editor); Heather Breckel, Lauren Perry (coloring)
	My Little Pony: Equestria Girls Holiday Special	December 17, 2014	—
(See My Little Pony: Equestria Girls#Comics.)
	My Little Pony Holiday Special	December 2, 2015	—
Trying to get home from Canterlot, Twilight Sparkle and Spike find themselves stuck at the train station in a blizzard. Twilight hunts for a book in her saddlebags to pass the time but cannot find it, not knowing that her father borrowed it without telling her. All she can find are several Hearth's Warming books for foals on sale at the station, so she settles in to read to Spike.: The Flying Reindeer: In this story, all the ponies are reindeer instead. Rainbow Dash's flying skill leads Diamond Tiara and Silver Spoon to ostracize her. Princess Luna crashes into Rainbow while hauling a cartload of gifts and injures a wing, so she presses a less-than-enthusiastic Rainbow into helping finish the deliveries. Luna urges Rainbow to appreciate the uniqueness of her flying ability.; The Toy and the Mouse: Rarity receives a gift of an ornate, soldier-shaped nutcracker doll and falls asleep with it next to her Hearth's Warming tree. The doll turns into a real prince at midnight, but when the Mouse King shows up, Rarity becomes disgusted and storms out of the story.; 'Twas the Night of Hearth's Warming Eve: A poem narrated by Big McIntosh. He settles down to bed on the night before the holiday, but is awakened by a noise that proves to be Applejack and Apple Bloom trying to build a present for him. The sisters ineptly carry the end result across the farmyard and drop it down the chimney, leaving Macintosh barely enough time to extinguish the fireplace in the living room. The present turns out to be a scale model of the farmhouse, which touches him deeply.; The rest of Twilight's friends break through the snowdrifts around the station, having had no word from her. She has missed Pinkie Pie's Hearth's Warming Eve party, so they have brought the party to her.: Katie Cook (story); Katie Cook, Andy Price, Agnes Garbowska, Brenda Hickey, Heather Breckel (art); Brenda Hickey, Agnes Garbowska, Katie Cook (cover artist)
	My Little Pony: Guardians of Harmony Annual 2017	March 1, 2017	—
Six 8-page stories that center around a changeling invasion of Equestria.: Shadowbolts: Rainbow Dash plans to spend time distracting Pinkie Pie so that Cheese Sandwich can plan a party for her. Applejack arrives with news that Queen Chrysalis and her changelings are attacking the Crystal Empire. Rainbow starts off toward Canterlot to rendezvous with the Wonderbolts, but two Shadowbolts intercept her and challenge her to a race. They try to knock her off course, but she uses their own tricks to trap them in a log. Finding that they are actually changelings sent to distract her, Rainbow hurries to Canterlot.; Pinkie Pie: In Ponyville, Cheese goes to work planning a birthday/anniversary party for Pinkie at Twilight Sparkle's request. He is surprised at the arrival of Pinkie, who was supposed to meet up with Rainbow, and the changelings abduct and replace him as she looks over his party cannon. The duplicate Cheese attacks Pinkie, but the real one warns her of the deception and she uses his cannon to free him and knock the duplicate out. The two team up to drive the changelings back, then get to work on planning Pinkie's party together.; Shining Armor: In the Crystal Empire, Princess Cadance tells Shining Armor to stay in the castle and keep Flurry Heart safe. He comes across a book about Princess Amore, who created many powerful spells and hid them in the caverns beneath the castle, and goes looking for them. In the caverns, he finds an injured Fluttershy and insists on helping her rather than look for the spells, saying that everypony's life deserves to be protected. The image of Fluttershy is replaced by one of Amore, who had set up this scenario as a test; having passed, Shining gains access to her laboratory and finds a potion with a dragon's image swirling within.; Twilight Sparkle: In Ponyville, Sweetie Drops tries to get Lyra to safety, but Lyra calls her a terrible friend and says she has always hated her. This Lyra is a changeling impostor; the real Lyra drives her away, and Twilight takes her and Sweetie Drops back to the Castle of Friendship. Twilight's cutie mark summons her to the Cutie Map, which sends her to the top floor and a door that can only be opened by two ponies whose friendship has survived the harshest of tests. Lyra and Sweetie Drops are able to open it, behind which Twilight finds the Armor of Friendship to use in saving Ponyville.; Wonderbolts: In Canterlot, Princesses Celestia and Luna have summoned Spitfire and Soarin' for a meeting. They are assigned to take the Wonderbolts north and defend the Crystal Empire. Soarin' rounds up the rest of the team but cannot find Rainbow Dash, and Spitfire equips them with a set of glider prototypes that will let them reach the Empire quickly. As soon as they arrive, though, they find themselves severely overmatched.; Big Spike: In Ponyville, the Mane Six and Spike gather just as a letter from Celestia arrives, warning them that Chrysalis and her forces are coming their way. Shining Armor arrives with the potion he took from Amore's lab; after sampling it, Twilight casts a spell to equip him and the rest of the Mane Six with armor. Spike insists that she needs to cast it on him as well, but she ignores him as the others prepare to fight. They are quickly overwhelmed, and Twilight grants Spike's request. The spell turns him into a giant, and he is able to rout the changelings with ease and save Ponyville.; Christina Rice, Jeremy Whitley (stories); Tony Fleecs, Jay Fosgitt, Andy Price, Heather Breckel (art); Jay Fosgitt, Andy Price (cover artists)
	My Little Pony: Deviations	March 8, 2017	—
This issue is part of Deviations, a five-week series in which each issue explores an alternate timeline in a different IDW universe. After filly Twilight Sparkle takes her entrance exam to Celestia's School for Gifted Unicorns, Princess Celestia decides not to mentor her, since she is already showing great magical talent. Instead, she takes on Prince Blueblood as her personal student in order to help him overcome his struggles with schoolwork and socialization. However, he becomes even more arrogant over the years, to the point that Celestia hurriedly sends him to Ponyville to oversee the plans for the Summer Sun Celebration and make some friends. Blueblood takes an unscheduled side trip to Manehattan first; by the time he arrives in Ponyville, Nightmare Moon has already escaped from the moon and is threatening the town. He antagonizes Applejack, Fluttershy, and Rarity and disrupts Rainbow Dash's efforts to contain Nightmare Moon, allowing her to break loose. When Pinkie Pie tries to defuse the situation with a joke, Blueblood derides her humor, annoying her to the point that she tells Nightmare Moon to be quiet so she can scold him. Nightmare Moon comes to see how disagreeable Blueblood really is and, not wanting to be compared to him, abandons her plan for eternal night and reverts to Princess Luna. The Mane Five befriend her, and she launches both Blueblood and his pet dog Bunny to the moon. In a short side story, Blueblood quickly grows bored with being alone on the moon and orders Bunny to construct a society for him. Bunny surreptitiously arranges the buildings to spell the word HELP, which Celestia can see from Canterlot. She arrives on the moon and is greatly surprised to find Blueblood "ruling" over crowds built from moon rocks as a self-proclaimed emperor.: Katie Cook (story); Katie Cook, Agnes Garbowska (art); Katie Cook, Agnes Garbowska, Sara Richard (cover artists)
	My Little Pony Holiday Special 2017	December 13, 2017	—
The Flim Flam Brothers arrive in Ponyville and unveil their plan to turn Hearth's Warming into an entire shopping holiday season. They invent the story of Windy the Windigo, who brings snow to ponies who show her kindness, and start selling merchandise based on the character in all the shops. Twilight Sparkle and Applejack disapprove of the marketing gimmicks that they believe are cheapening the holiday's meaning, but Pinkie Pie, Spike, and Apple Bloom enjoy the displays and have fun making up lists of the presents they want to receive. To counter the brothers, Twilight announces that since Windy is so generous with the winter weather she brings, they should honor her by not charging for their Windy-themed merchandise. Realizing that they will quickly go broke if they take her suggestion, the brothers hastily pack up and leave Ponyville. Angry at Twilight and Applejack for ruining the festive mood, Pinkie, Spike, and Apple Bloom leave. Twilight and Applejack wander to Sweet Apple Acres, where they see the three enjoying the company of Granny Smith and Big McIntosh, and realize that their insistence on tradition and factual correctness has caused the rift. Both sides apologize to each other, now understanding that ponies can appreciate the same holiday in different ways, and go inside to rejoin the Apples' gathering. As Twilight and Applejack privately admit to each other that they are starting to believe in Windy, snow begins to fall – courtesy of Rainbow Dash.: James Asmus (story); Brenda Hickey (art); Andy Price, Brenda Hickey (cover artists)
	My Little Pony: Legends of Magic Annual 2018	April 18, 2018	—
Some time after his first team up with the other Pillars of Equestria and Stygian, Star Swirl shows Princesses Celestia and Luna a collection of magical mirrors he intends to use to travel to other worlds. Unfortunately, the open gateways allow a force of monstrous creatures to attack, and Star Swirl ends up separated from the princesses with his mirrors destroyed. He manages to take himself back to Equestria and reunites with the other Pillars and Stygian, and is persuaded to let them join in his attempt to rescue Celestia and Luna. Using a temporary portal, the group is able to travel to the world where Celestia and Luna have been taken, which is the same world Luna was taken to in Legends of Magic #1. Splitting up, the group find that the ecosystem is wholly corrupted, and it proves to be an alternate Equestria dominated by its Pony of Shadows. The Pony of Shadows reveals that Luna and Celestia became Nightmare Moon and Daybreaker in this world, and he intends to bring about the same corruption in the kidnapped princesses and use their power to conquer all worlds. He also recognizes all the Pillars-having previously destroyed his world's Star Swirl-but is confused by the presence of Stygian. While the Pillars fight against the Pony of Shadows' monsters, Stygian is able to rescue the princesses due to an inexplicable ability to command those same creatures. Returning home, the Pillars celebrate their victory, and Star Swirl promises to be more careful in future interdimensional studies. Meanwhile, the Pony of Shadows, having heard Stygian's name prior to his foes' escape, sheds his dark cloak and is revealed to be an alternate Stygian, so long immersed in darkness that he had forgotten his former identity.: Jeremy Whitley (story); Brenda Hickey (cover artist)
	My Little Pony: IDW 20/20	January 23, 2019	—
This issue is part of IDW 20/20, a five-week series in which each issue is set in a different IDW universe, 20 years earlier or later than its respective time frame. Wearing the Elements of Harmony, the Mane Six are in Canterlot to greet a visiting Abyssinian delegation and watch an airshow by Rainbow Dash. A lightning strike during her Sonic Rainboom finale transports them into the past, at the moment when each of them got their cutie marks (see the Season 1 episode "The Cutie Mark Chronicles"). They meet their younger selves and gather in Ponyville, where they discover a sealed portal that can take them back to their own time; however, it can only be opened with the Elements, lost in the time jump. Twilight and Rarity sense their presence in two different directions, and the twelve split up to find them, with three mares and three fillies in each group. As they collect the Elements, the mares tell the fillies about some of their adventures and emphasize the importance of friendship and teamwork. All twelve are able to open the portal by working together, whereupon Princess Celestia arrives and casts a spell to erase everypony's memories of the day in order to avoid any damage to the timeline. The spell wears off as soon as the Mane Six return to the present, allowing them to remember meeting their filly selves and the start of their friendship.: Ted Anderson (story); Toni Kuusisto (art); Heather Breckel (colors); Toni Kuusisto, Tony Fleecs (cover artists)
	My Little Pony Holiday Special 2019	November 27, 2019	—
James Asmus (story); Andy Price, Trish Forstner (art); Heather Breckel (colors); Neil Uyetake (letters); Andy Price, Trish Forstner (cover artists); Christa Miesner (design); Megan Brown (editor)
	My Little Pony Equestria Girls: Canterlot High: March Radness	March 25, 2020	—
(See My Little Pony: Equestria Girls#Comics.)
	My Little Pony: Friendship is Magic: Free Comic Book Day 2020	July 15, 2020	—
Jeremy Whitley (story); Brenda Hickey (cover artist); Trish Forstner a (art); Heather Breckel (color); Christa Miesner (lettering); Megan Brown (editor)
	My Little Pony: Annual 2021	April 28, 2021	—
Jeremy Whitley (story); Brianna Garcia (art/cover artist)
	My Little Pony Classics Reimagined Valentine's Day Special: Romeo and Juliet	February 8, 2024	—
Jeremy Whitley (story); Jenna Ayoub (art/cover artist)
	My Little Pony Classics Reimagined: The Odyssey	November 8, 2024	—
Megan Brown (story); Jenna Ayoub (art/cover artist)
	My Little Pony: Rise of Cadance	January 29, 2025	—
Early one morning in the Crystal Empire, Princess Cadance looks out from her balcony as she contemplates the power and responsibility she has a princess. As she reflects how she earned her place, the comic reverts to the key moments in Cadance's life before the events of the series. Cadance narrates that her earliest memory is of three mares who find her abandoned as an infant. She is then taken in and raised as the only pegasus in a village of earth ponies. The love she brought to the villagers attracts an evil sorceress named Prismia, who feeds off of love. A young Cadance confronts Prismia, and when the sorceress tries to leech love from the filly that love overpowers and defeats Prismia. Princess Celestia arrives to banish the wicked pony to Tartarus, but Cadance pleads for the princess to show mercy and proves that Prismia is capable of redemption. This act of compassion earns Cadance her cutie mark, and as Celestia recognizes this filly's destiny, she asks that Cadance leave for Canterlot with her. In her new home, Cadance struggles to understand her purpose, despite the reassurance of her new mentor. Cadance finds most of her comfort in this time flying with the Royal Guard and looking after the preschool foals in Celestia's school. One night, Cadance is awoken to news that dragons are attacking Canterlot. She rushes into the heart of the battle, but instead Celestia tasks her with evacuating the foals of Canterlot to safety. When confronted by the leader of these dragons named Liebe, Cadance recognizes pain the attacker's eyes and attempts to reconcile with words. Her plea brings Liebe to tears as she calls off her dragons. This proves to Celestia that Cadance is ready, and she ascends to become an alicorn. Celestia finally reveals that Cadance descends from Princess Amore and that she will one day retake the throne of the Crystal Empire. As Cadance finally understands her purpose, the comic closes with Cadance being introduced to a young Twilight Sparkle.: Christina Rice (story); Abby Bulmer (art/cover artist)
