= Guatemala City =

Capital and largest city of Guatemala

Guatemala City Ciudad de Guatemala
- Capital city
- Nueva Guatemala de la Asunción; New Guatemala of the Assumption
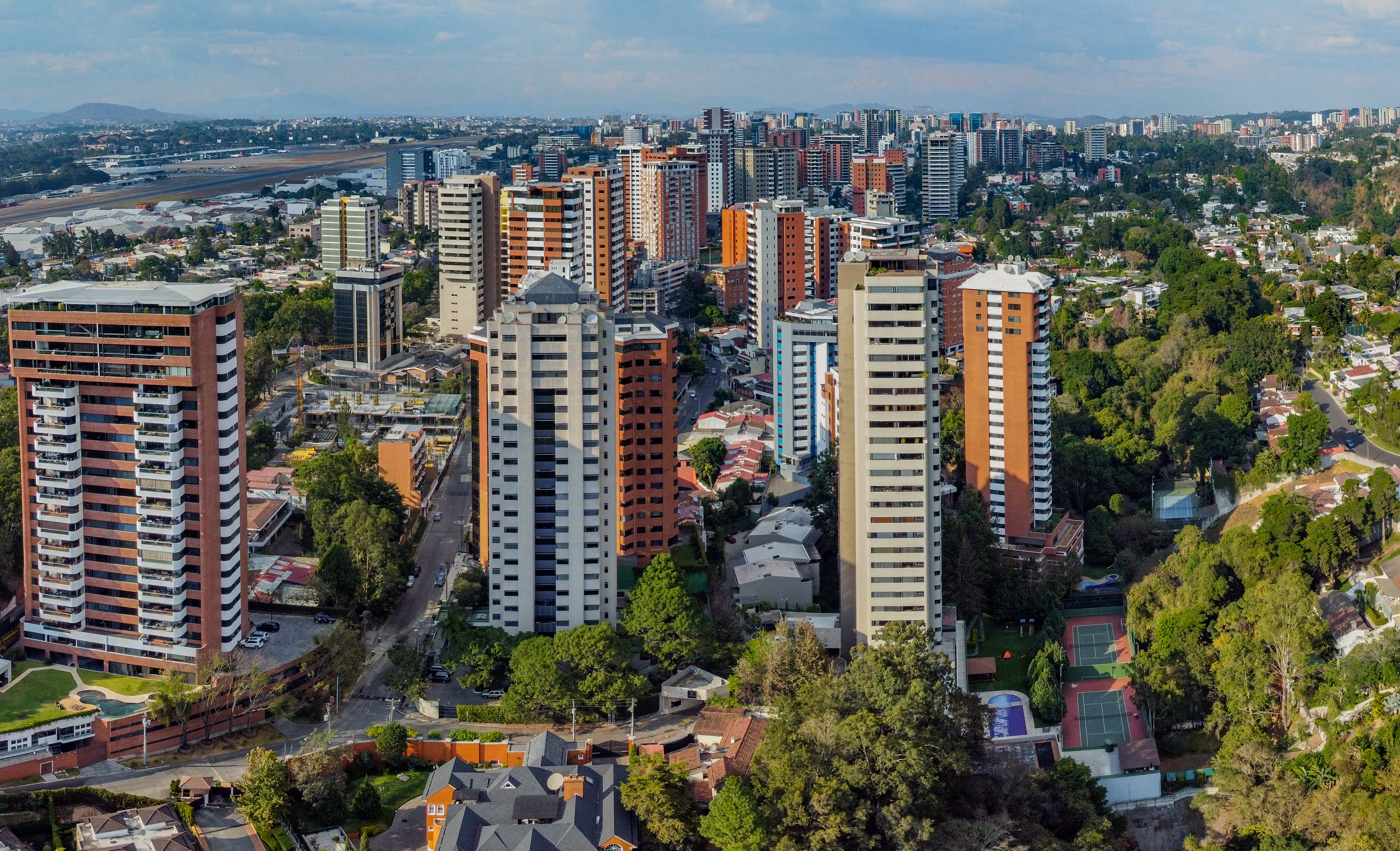
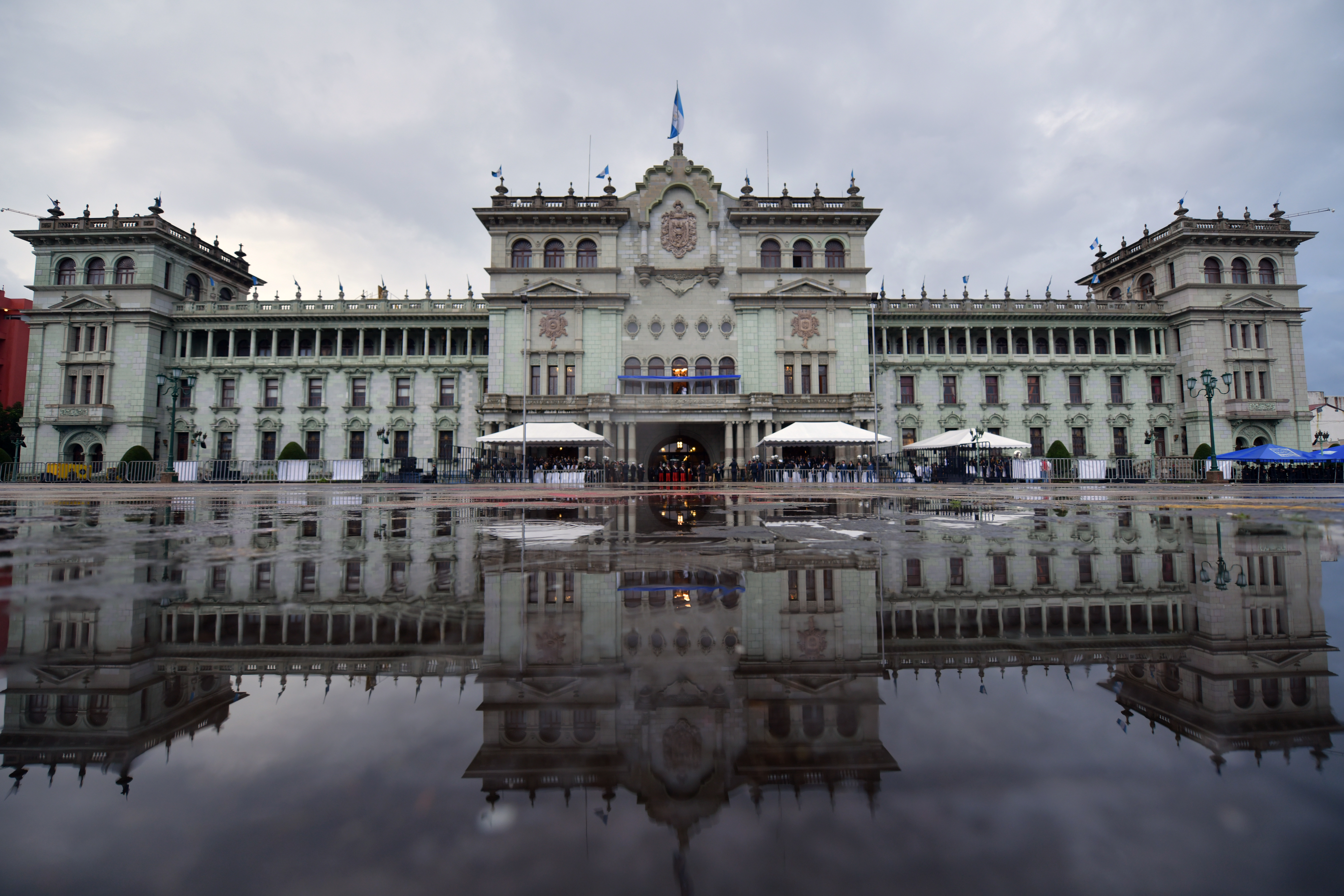
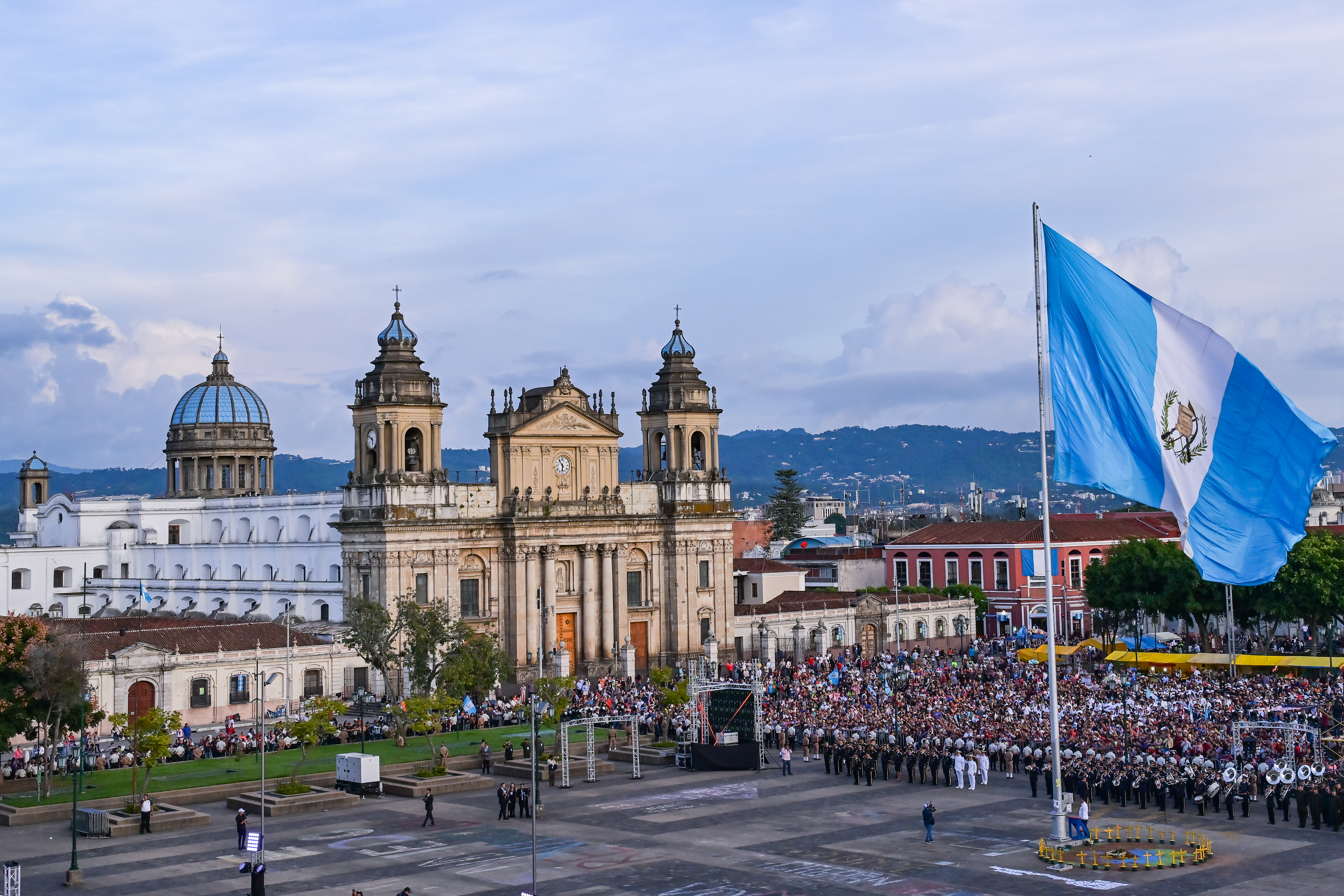
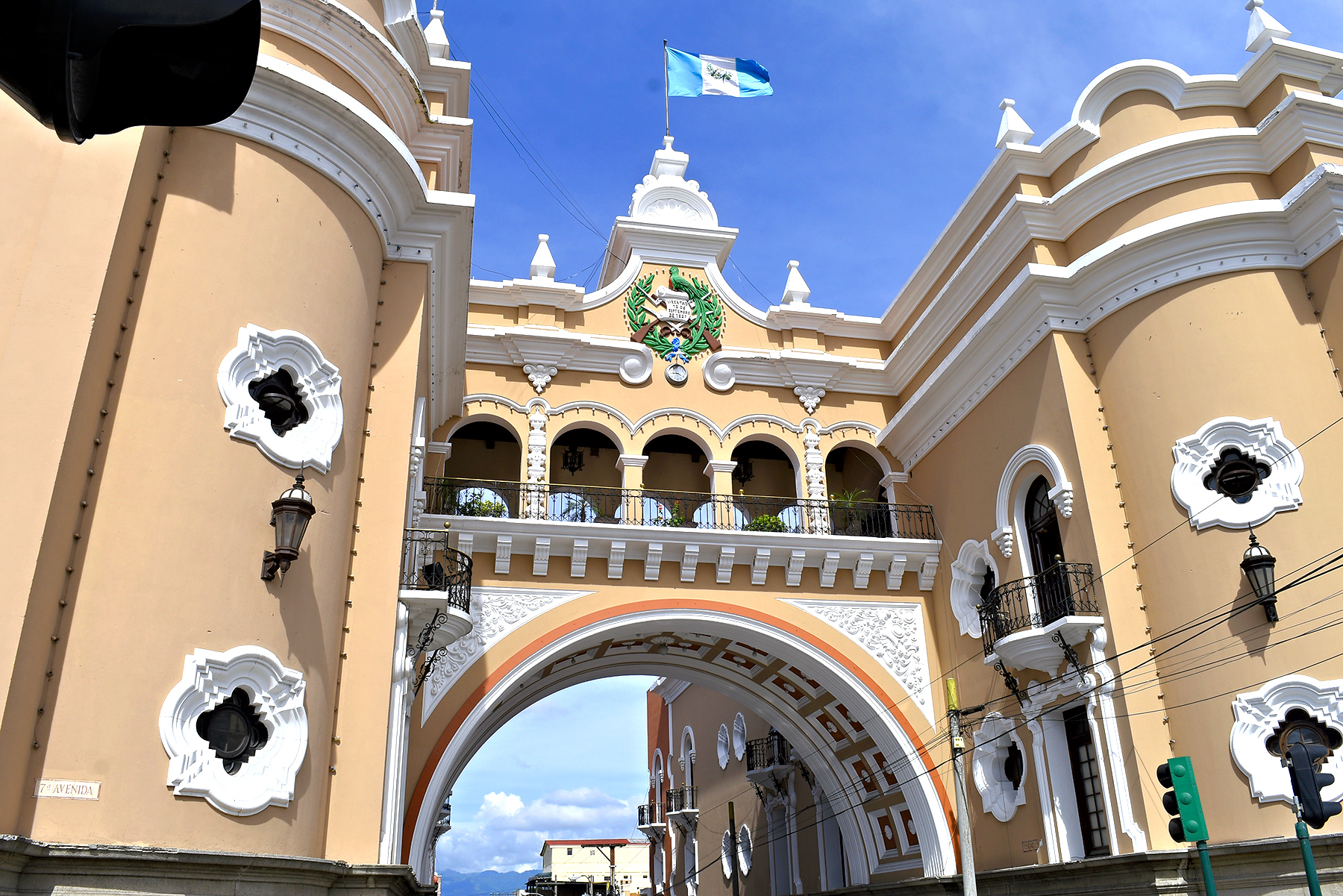
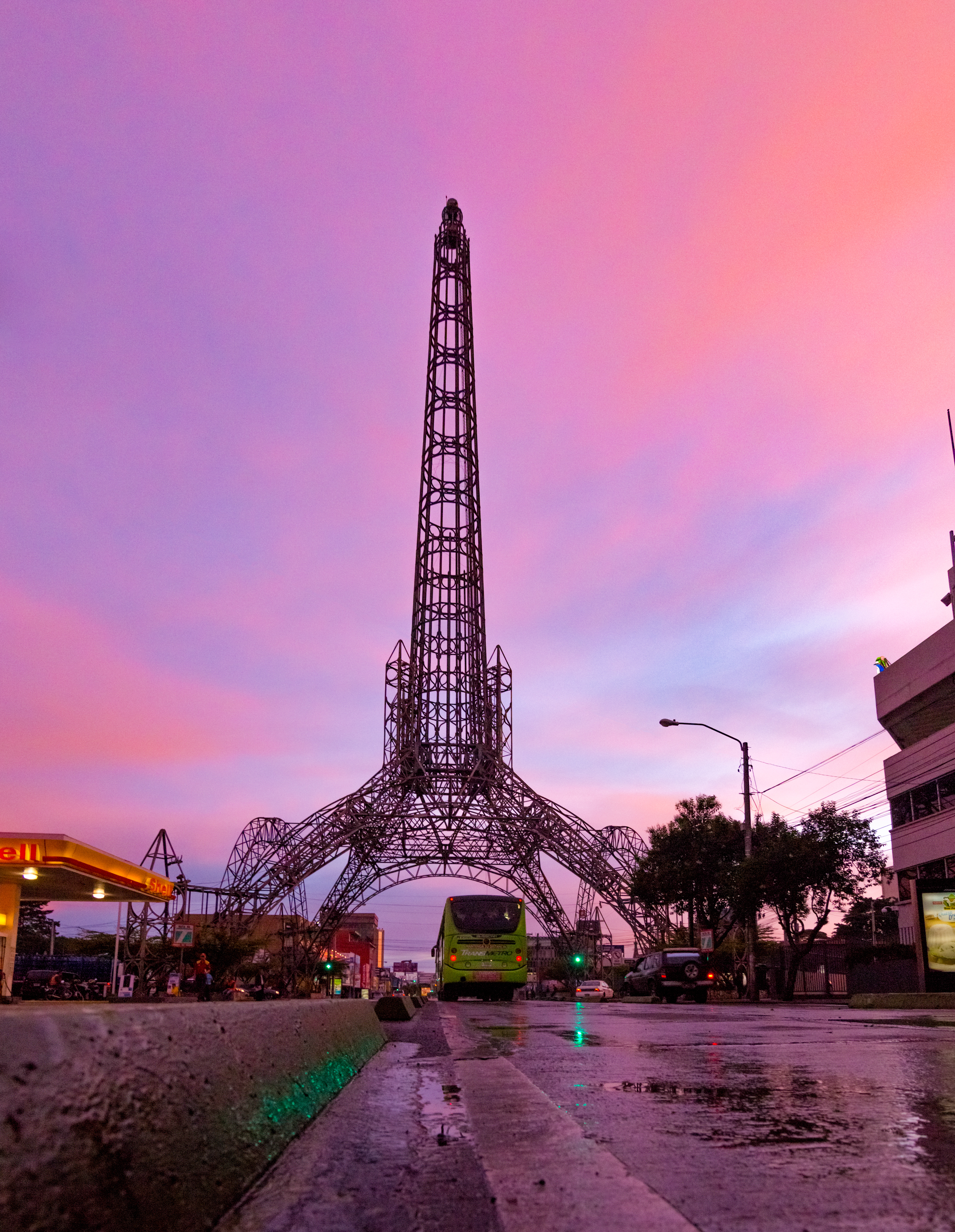
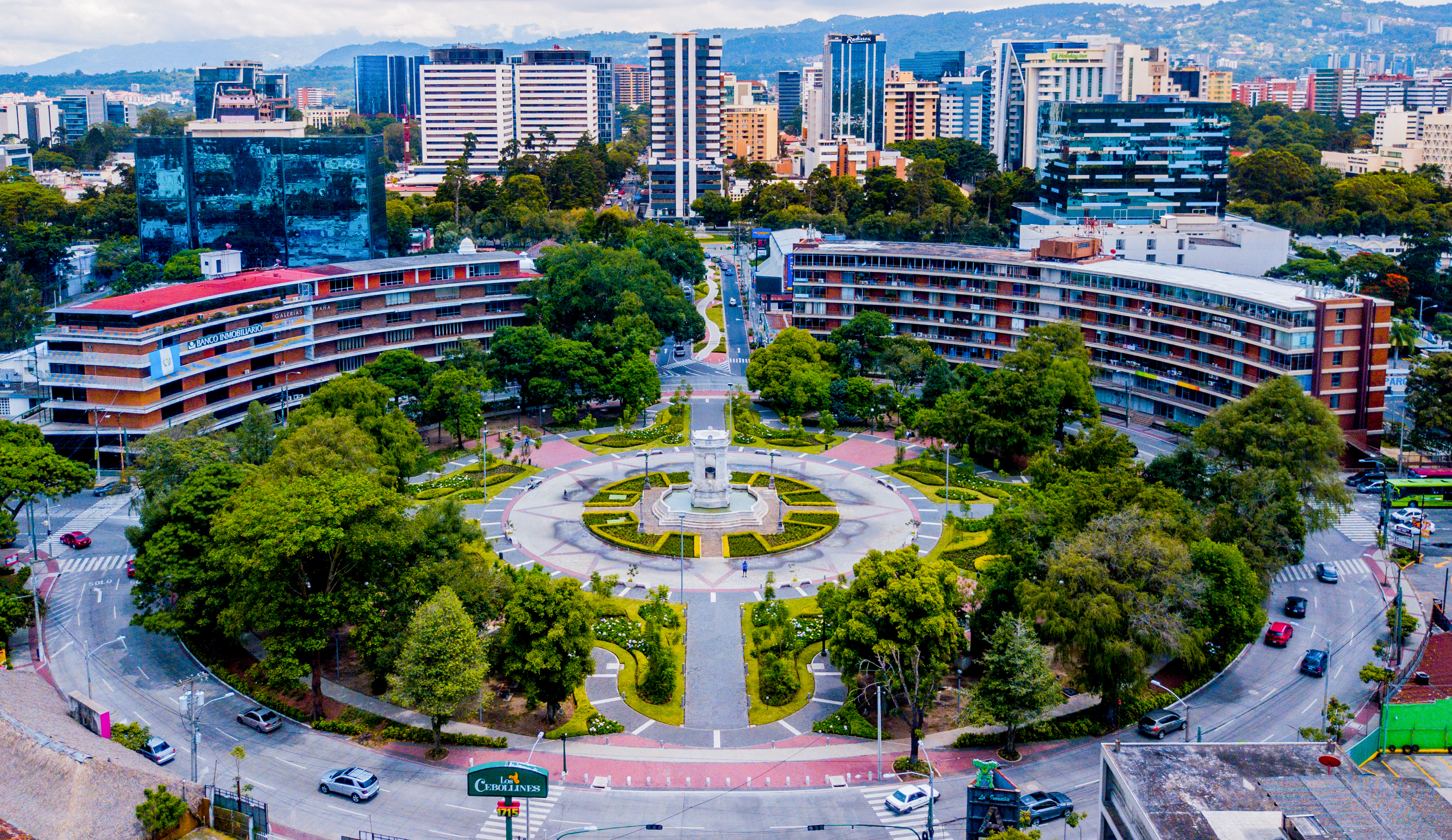
- Skyline of Zone 14 National Palace of Culture Metropolitan Cathedral of Santiago Post Office Reformer's Tower Plaza España

- Flag Coat of arms
- Motto(s): "Todos somos la ciudad" (We are all the city), "Tú eres la ciudad" (You are the city).
- Location within Guatemala Location within Central America Location within North America
- Coordinates: 14°38′30″N 90°30′48″W
- Country: Guatemala
- Department: Guatemala
- Founded: 1524 (by Pedro de Alvarado)
- As capital: 1776

Government
  - Type: Municipality
  - Mayor: Ricardo Quiñónez Lemus (Unionist)

Area
  - Capital city: 228.7 km^{2} (88.3 sq mi)
- Elevation: 1,500 m (4,900 ft)

Population (2023 projection)
  - Capital city: 1,221,739
  - Rank: 1st in Guatemala; 2nd in Central America
  - Density: 5,342/km^{2} (13,840/sq mi)
  - Metro: 3,230,000
- Demonym(s): capitalino, guatemalteco

Ethnicity
  - Ladino: 91.3%
  - Mayan: 7.1%
  - Other: 1.6%

GDP (metro)
  - Urban: US$24 billion (2023)
  - Per capita: US$7,700 (2023)
- Time zone: UTC−06:00 (CST)
- Climate: Tropical savanna climate (Aw)
- Website: www.muniguate.com

Guatemala City (Spanish: Ciudad de Guatemala), also known colloquially by the nickname Guate, is the national capital and largest city of the Republic of Guatemala. It serves as the municipal capital of the surrounding Guatemala Department. Its metropolitan area is also the largest in Central America. The city is located in a mountain valley called Valle de la Ermita (English: 'Hermitage Valley') in the south-central part of the country.

Guatemala City is the site of the native Mayan city of Kaminaljuyu in Mesoamerica, which was occupied primarily between 1500 BCE and 1200 CE. The present city was founded by the Spanish after their colonial capital, now called Antigua Guatemala was destroyed by the devastating 1773 Santa Marta earthquake and its aftershocks. It became the third royal capital of the surrounding Captaincy General of Guatemala; which itself was part of the larger Viceroyalty of New Spain in imperial Spanish America and remained under colonial rule until the nineteenth century.

In September 1821, Guatemala City was the site of the famous Act of Independence of Central America, which declared the independence of the region from the Spanish Empire. It was ratified and enacted on 15 September, now celebrated annually as Guatemala's independence day and called the Dias Patrios. For the next several decades, Guatemala City was the federation capital of the newly established and independent government of the United Provinces of Central America, which was later reorganized and renamed the Federal Republic of Central America. In August 1847, Guatemala declared itself an independent republic, separate from the larger federation, and Guatemala City became its national capital.

Guatemala City and the surrounding region were almost completely destroyed by the 1917–1918 Guatemala earthquakes and months of continued aftershocks. Reconstructions since have resulted in a more modern architectural landscape, including wider streets and a grid lay-out for new developments, inspired by post-18th century designs of architects in other national capital cities such as Paris, France and Washington, D.C.

As the political,religious, and economic hub of Guatemala, Guatemala City exerts a powerful financial and cultural influence across Central and Latin America.

== Names ==
Guatemala City (Spanish: Ciudad de Guatemala) is known colloquially by Guatemalans as La Capital or Guate. Its formal name is Nueva Guatemala de la Asunción (New Guatemala of the Assumption). The latter name is derived from the fact that it was a new Guatemala after the old one (La Antigua) was ruined by an earthquake. Also, Assumption is in honor of the Virgin of the Assumption, whose festivity is 15 August, the city's feast day.

== History ==
=== Early history ===
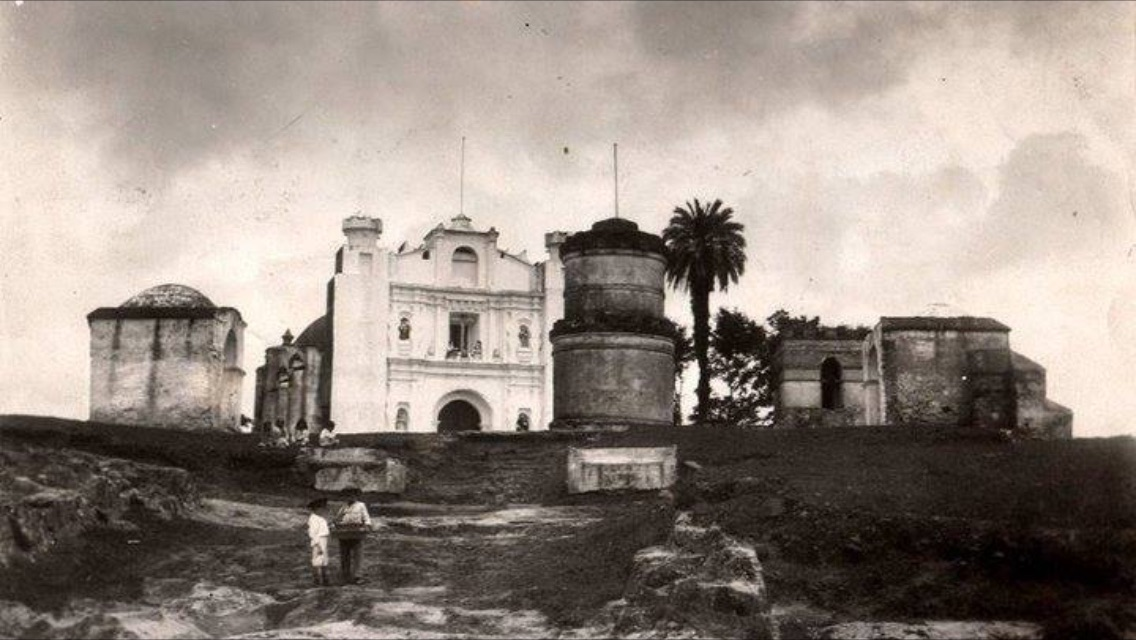
Cerrito del Carmen church, the first Spanish building in the valley that eventually became Guatemala City.

Human settlement on the present site of Guatemala City began with the native indigenous Maya people, who built a large ceremonial center at Kaminaljuyu. This large Maya settlement, the biggest outside the Maya lowlands in the Yucatán Peninsula of southeast Mexico, rose to prominence around 2,300 years ago, in about 300 B.C. due to an increase in mining and trading of obsidian, a valuable commodity of volcanic glass (igneous rock) for the Pre-Columbian American civilizations in Mesoamerica. Kaminaljuyu then mysteriously collapsed around A.D. 300 for as yet unknown historical causes. More recent research, however, indicates that Kaminaljuyu’s economic and political decline occurred during the Late Classic period (AD 550–800), and that its ultimate collapse, driven by agricultural and political instability, severe droughts, and the diminishing lake, took place in the Terminal Classic period (AD 800–900). The ceremoninal center of Kaminaljuyu was located a short distance from the oldest part of Guatemala City. It is now a park within the city.

During the early Spanish colonial period, it was a small town with a monastery called El Carmen, founded in 1620, some time after the Spanish conquest of the territory.

=== Colonial history ===
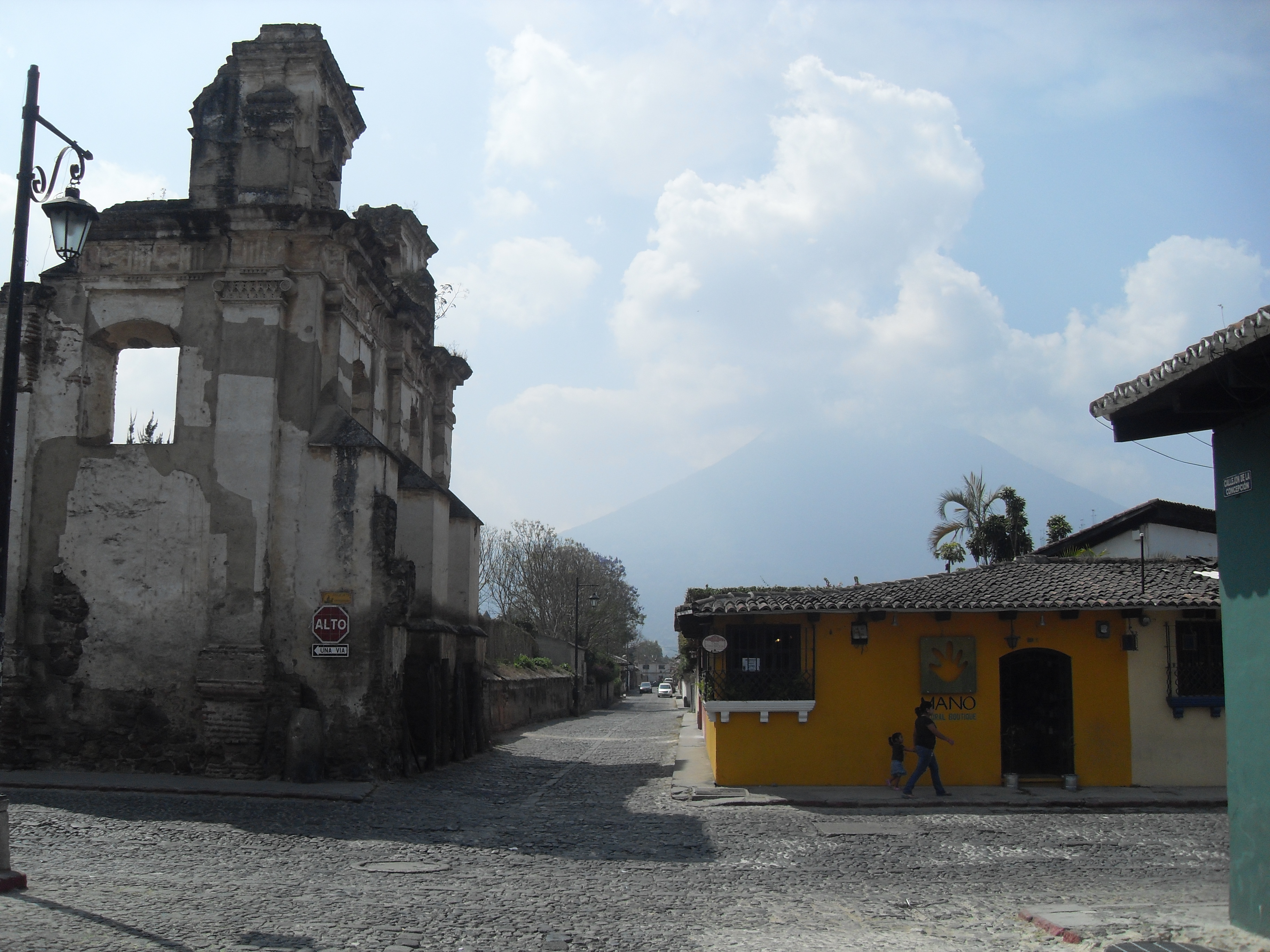
Ruins of the Convento de Nuestra Señora de la Concepción church in Antigua Guatemala.

A series of devastating earthquakes in 1773 had left the old provincial capital Antigua Guatemala in ruins. (Note: Called Santiago de los Caballeros before the earthquake.) This was the third earthquake the city experienced, after the 1717 earthquake and the 1751 earthquake. Thus, the Spanish decided to relocate the capital to somewhere safer. In 1776, the capital was moved to the current location of Guatemala City, located in a valley less prone to earthquakes.

In the new capital, the central plaza became the sight of the city's premier landmark, the immense neo-classical Metropolitan Cathedral, (Note: Officially named: Catedral Primada Metropolitana de Santiago.) which was mostly built between 1782–1815 and completed in 1871. It serves as the center of the country's Roman Catholic Church, the cathedral of the Archdiocese of Guatemala, and the residence of the current Archbishop of Guatemala.

Meanwhile, in Antigua Guatemala, work was done to rebuild structures like the Palace of the Captain-General that were heavily damaged. This was the palace that served as the headquarters for the colonial government of the Captaincy General of Guatemala, from 1542 to independence in 1821. Today it serves as the site for several national government offices, police, tourism agencies, and museum exhibits, including the National Museum of Guatemalan Art.

=== Independent history ===
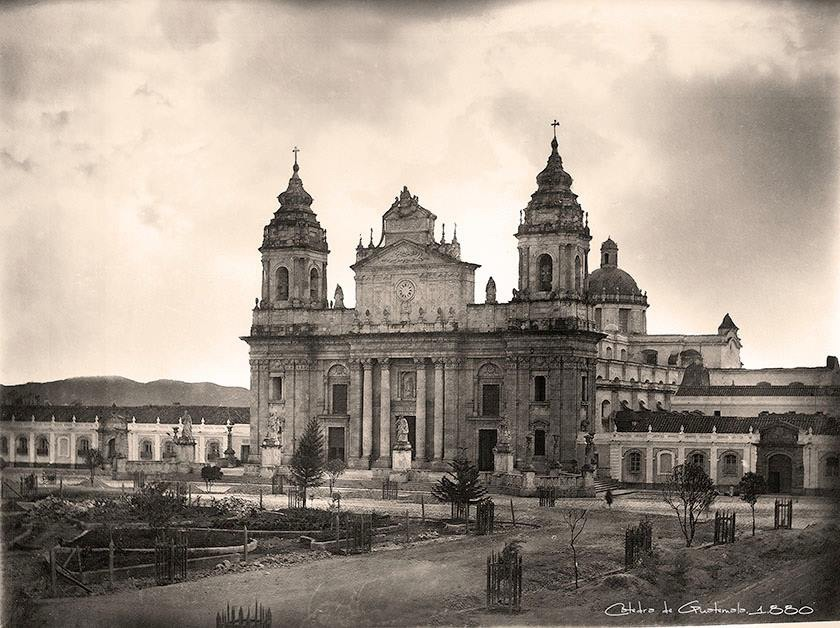
The Cathedral of Guatemala City photographed in 1880

A half-century later, after the ratification of the Act of Independence of Central America, the city became the capital of the newly organized independent United Provinces of Central America in September 1821.

The subsequent decades in the 19th century saw the construction of some significant structures in the town, such as the monumental Carrera Theater in the 1850s, and the modern-day Presidential Palace of Guatemala in the 1890s, which is still occupied by the president of Guatemala. At this time, the capital city was expanding around the 30 de Junio Boulevard and elsewhere, unfortunately displacing indigenous peoples in the settlements on the peripheries of the city.

The 1917-1918 earthquakes destroyed many structures in Guatemala City built during the late 18th and 19th centuries, during its 144 years after the previous devastating tremors of the Santa Marta Earthquake of 1773.

Despite this, the slums that had formed following the 1917–1918 series of earthquakes continued to grow and spread, bringing with them the lack of basic infrastructure such as potable water, sewage treatment, power lines, and paved and illuminated roads.

A decade later, under former military general and president Jorge Ubico, who consolidated power into an authoritarian dictatorship, Guatemala entered into a period of centralized control. During the 1930s, amidst the Great Depression that was affecting many nations' economies, Ubico's government began pursuing extensive public works such as a hippodrome and new buildings. This included the design and construction of the National Palace, built 1939–1943 as an official residence and headquarters for the President of the Republic. After 13 years in power, Ubico was overthrown in the Guatemalan Revolution of 1944, a democratic movement that still remains annually celebrated in the country, alongside the Independence Day of Central America.

=== Contemporary history ===
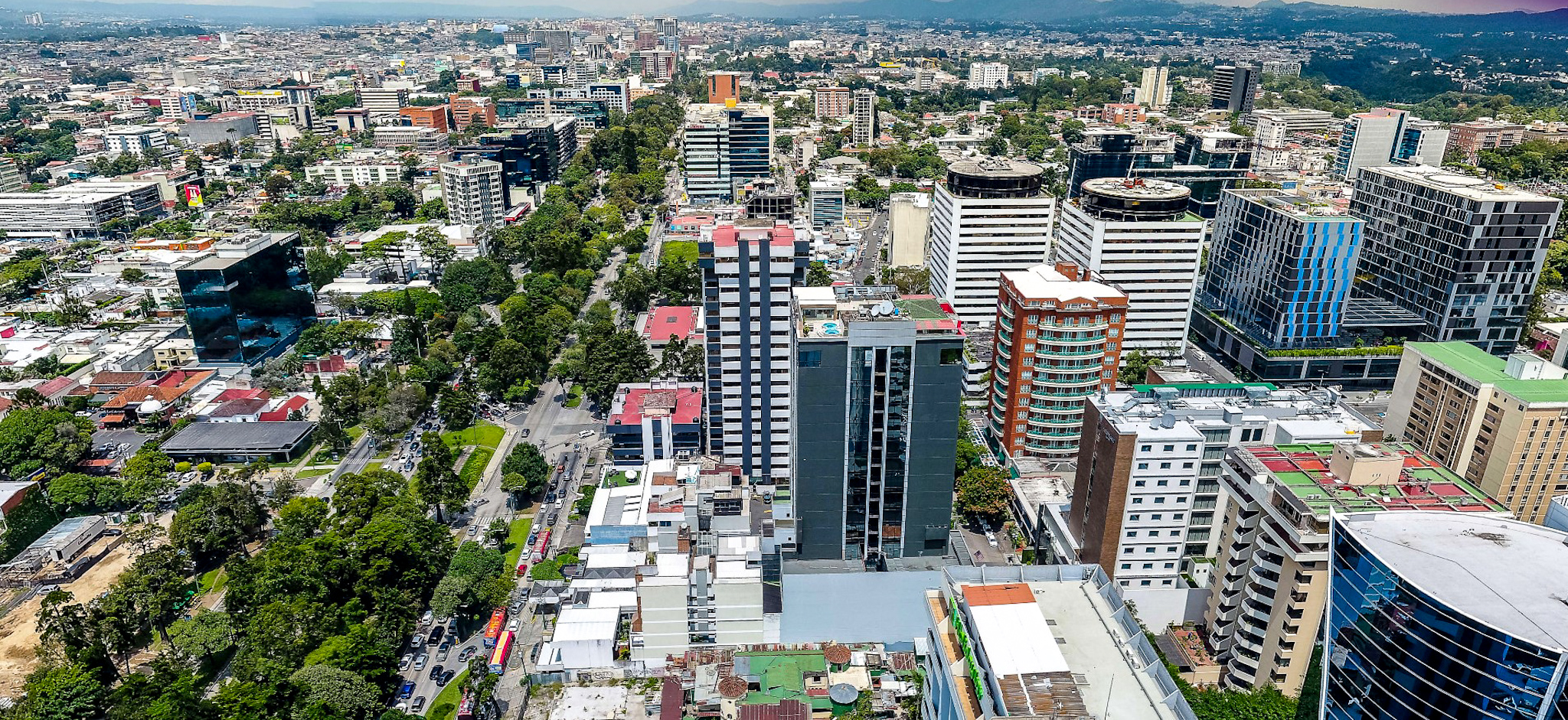
Zone 10 of Guatemala City

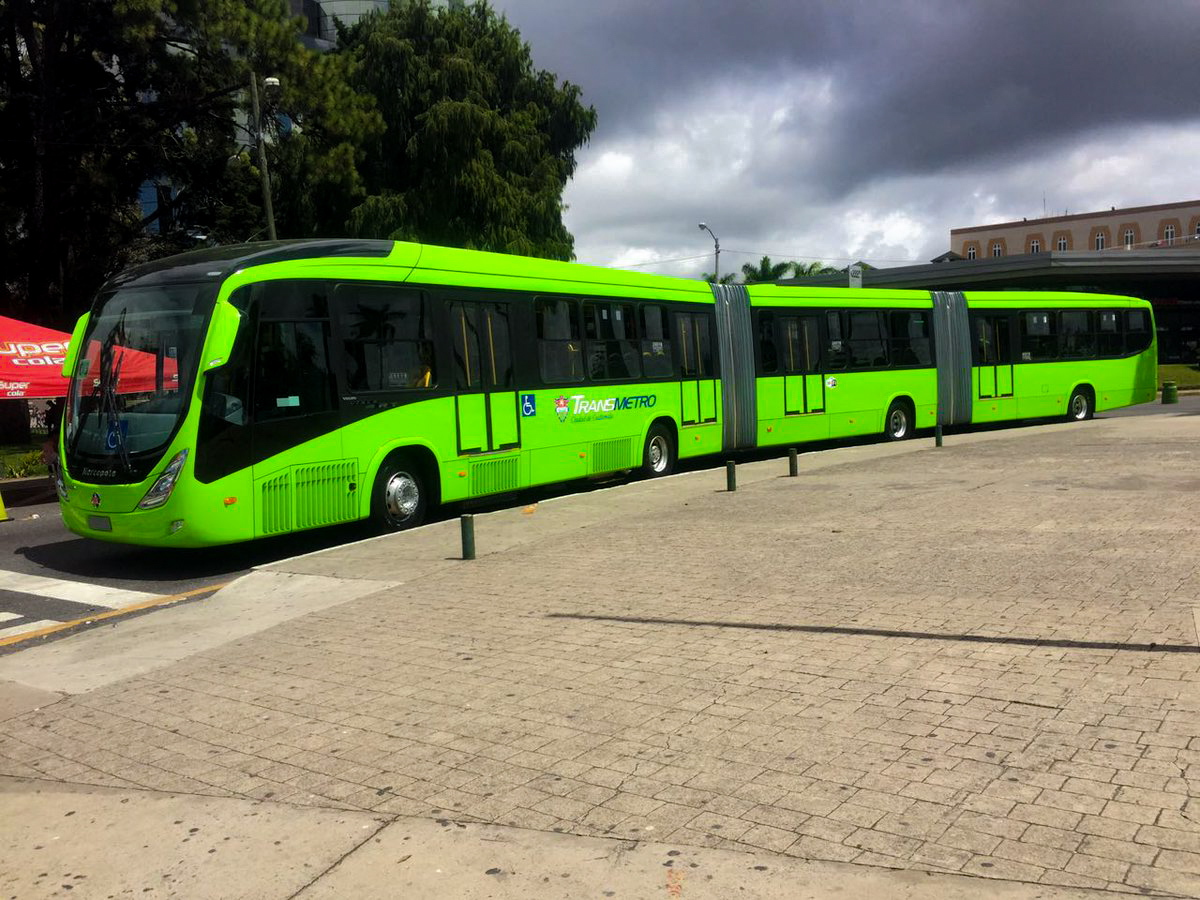
Transmetro

Guatemala City serves as the economic, governmental, and cultural center of the nation of Guatemala. The city also functions as Guatemala's main transportation hub, hosting an international airport, La Aurora International Airport, and serving as the origination or end points for most of Guatemala's major highways. The city, with its robust economy, attracts hundreds of thousands of rural migrants from Guatemala's interior hinterlands and serves as the main entry point for most foreign immigrants seeking to settle in Guatemala.

In addition to a wide variety of restaurants, hotels, shops, and a modern BRT transport system (Transmetro), the city is home to many art galleries, theaters, sports venues and museums (including collections of Pre-Columbian art) and provides a growing number of cultural offerings. Guatemala City also is home to an IMAX Theater and the Ícaro film festival (Festival Ícaro), where independent films produced in Guatemala and Central America are debuted.

Guatemala City continues to be subject to an unusual amount of natural and climate-related disasters, (especially recurring earthquakes) with the latest being the two disasters that struck simultaneously in May 2010: the eruption of the Pacaya volcano and, two days later, the torrential downpours from Tropical Storm Agatha of 2010.

== Structure and growth ==
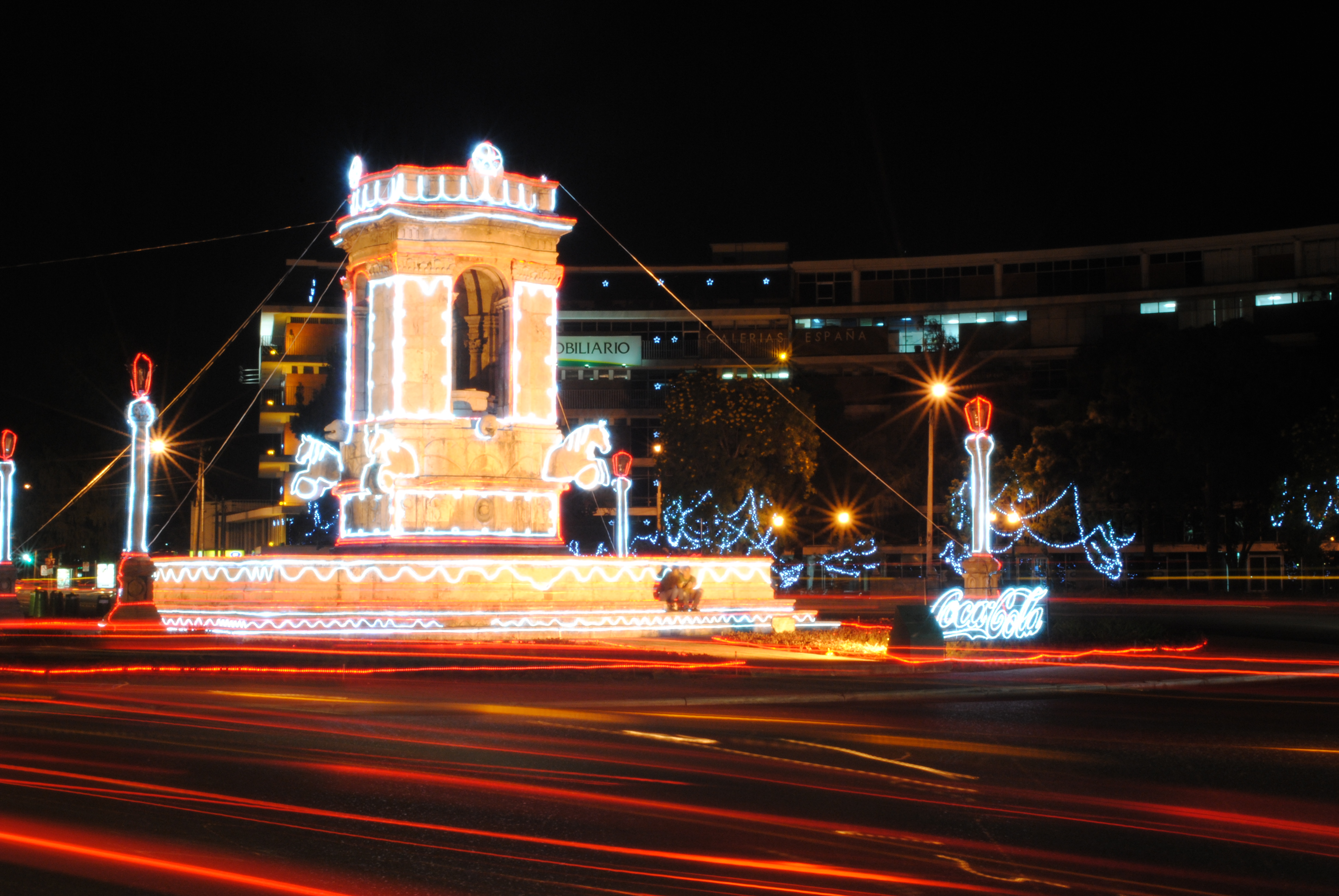
Plaza España at night

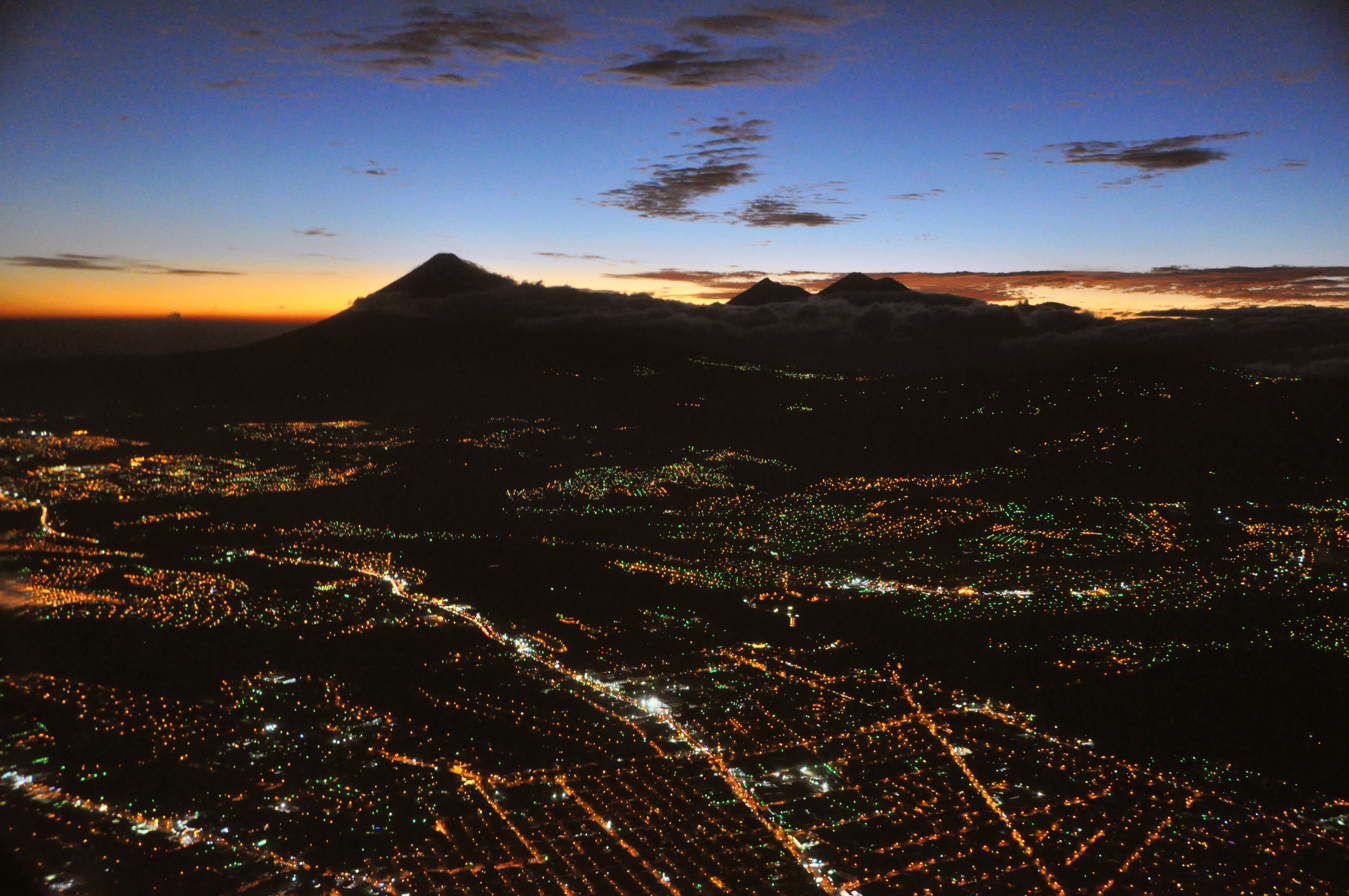
Evening view from a plane

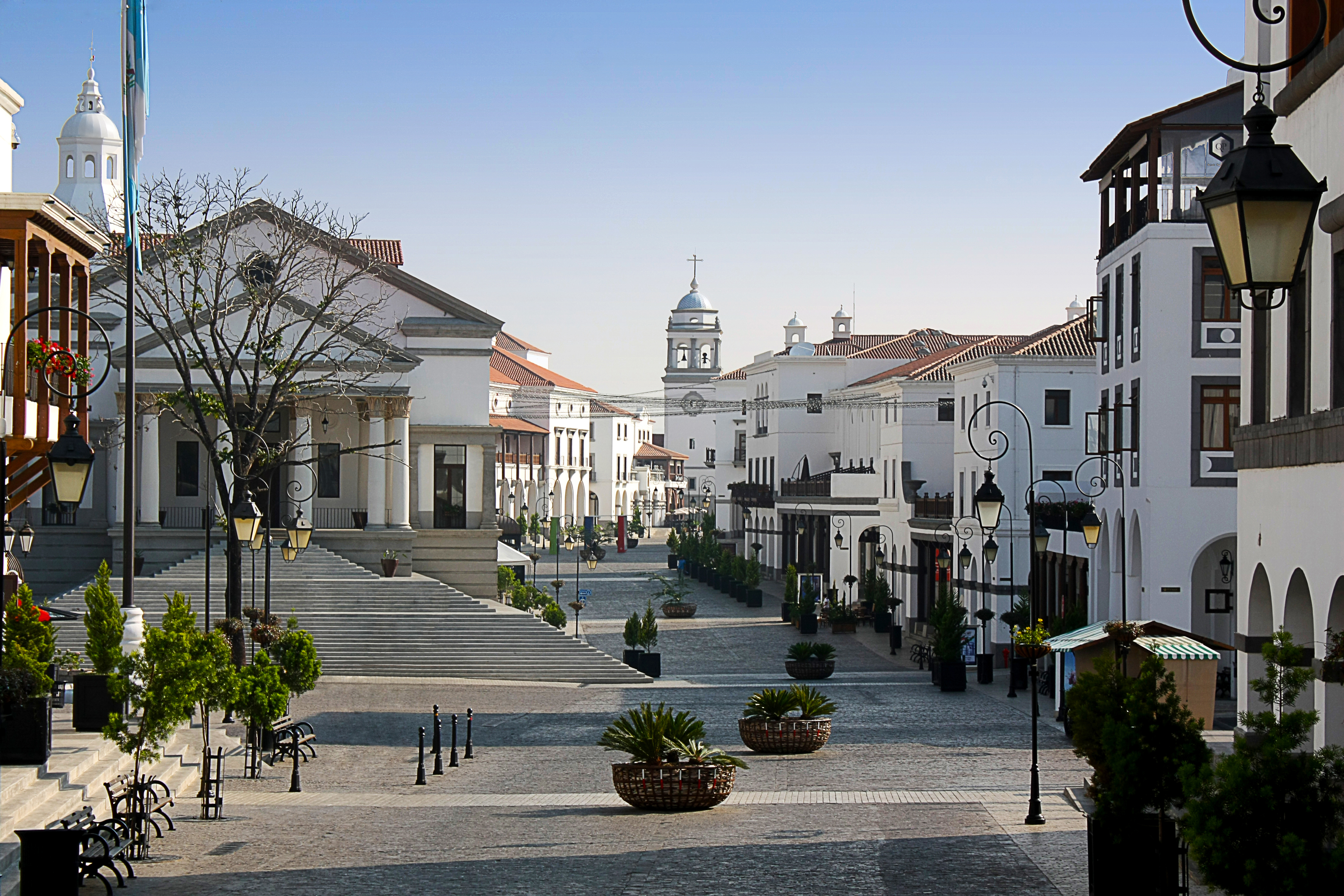
Cayalá City, a new neighbourhood of Guatemala City with vernacular architecture

Zone 14 of Guatemala City

Guatemala City is located in the mountainous regions of the country, between the Pacific coastal plain to the south and the northern lowlands of the Peten region.

The city's metropolitan area has recently grown very rapidly and has absorbed most of the neighboring municipalities of Villa Nueva, San Miguel Petapa, Mixco, San Juan Sacatepequez, San José Pinula, Santa Catarina Pinula, Fraijanes, San Pedro Ayampuc, Amatitlán, Villa Canales, Palencia, and Chinautla, forming what is now known as the Guatemala City Metropolitan Area.

The city is subdivided into 22 zones ("Zonas") designed by the urban engineering of Raúl Aguilar Batres, each one with its own streets ("Calles"), avenues ("Avenidas") and, sometimes, "Diagonal" Streets, making it pretty easy to find addresses in the city. Zones are numbered 1–25, with Zones 20, 22 and 23 not existing as they would have fallen in two other municipalities' territory. Addresses are assigned according to the street or avenue number, followed by a dash and the number of metres it is away from the intersection.

For example, the INGUAT Office on "7a Av. 1–17, Zona 4" is a building which is located on Avenida 7, 17 meters away from the intersection with Calle 1, toward Calle 2 in zone 4. 7a Av. 1–17, Zona 4; and 7a Av. 1–17, Zona 10, are two radically different addresses. Short streets/avenues do not get new sequenced number, for example, 6A Calle is a short street between 6a and 7a. Some "avenidas" or "Calles" have a name in addition to their number, if it is very wide; for example, Avenida la Reforma is an avenue which separates Zone 9 and 10, and Calle Montúfar is Calle 12 in Zone 9. Calle 1 Avenida 1 Zona 1 is the center of every city in Guatemala.

Zone One is the Historic Center (Centro Histórico), lying in the very heart of the city, the location of many important historic buildings, including the Palacio Nacional de la Cultura (National Palace of Culture), the Metropolitan Cathedral, the National Congress, the Casa Presidencial (Presidential House), the National Library, and Plaza de la Constitución (Constitution Plaza, old Central Park). Efforts to revitalize this important part of the city have been undertaken by the municipal government.

Beside the parks, the city offers a portfolio of entertainment in the region, focused on the so-called Zona Viva and the Calzada Roosevelt, as well as Cuatro Grados Norte. Casino activity is considerable, with several located in different parts of the Zona Viva. The area around the East market is being redeveloped. Within the financial district are the tallest buildings in the country, including: Club Premier, Tinttorento, Atlantis building, Atrium, Tikal Futura, Building of Finances, Towers Building Batteries, Torres Botticelli, Tadeus, building of the INTECAP, Royal Towers, Towers Geminis, Industrial Bank towers, Holiday Inn Hotel, Premier of the Americas, among many others to be used for offices, apartments, etc. Also included are projects such as Zona Pradera and Interamerica's World Financial Center.

One of the most outstanding mayors was the engineer Martin Prado Vélez, who took over in 1949, and ruled the city during the reformist presidents Juan José Arévalo and Jacobo Arbenz Guzman, although he was not a member of the ruling party at the time and was elected due his well-known capabilities. Of cobanero origin, married with Marta Cobos, he studied at the University of San Carlos; under his tenure, among other modernist works of the city, infrastructure projects included El Incienso bridge, the construction of the Roosevelt Avenue, the main road axis from East to West of the city, the town hall building, and numerous road works which meant the widening of the colonial city, its order in the cardinal points and the generation of a ring road with the first cloverleaf interchange in the city.

In an attempt to control the rapid growth of the city, the municipal government (Municipalidad de Guatemala), headed by longtime Mayor Álvaro Arzú, has implemented a plan to focus growth along important arterial roads and apply Transit-oriented development (TOD) characteristics. This plan, denominated POT (Plan de Ordenamiento Territorial), aims to allow taller building structures of mixed uses to be built next to large arterial roads, and gradually decline in height and density moving away from such. It is also worth mentioning, that due to the airport being in the south of the city, height limits based on aeronautical considerations have been applied to the construction code. This limits the maximum height for a building, at 60 metres (200 feet) in Zone 10, up to 95 metres (312 feet) in Zone 1.

== Climate ==
As it is in the tropics, Guatemala City has a tropical savannah climate (Köppen Aw) bordering on a more temperate humid subtropical climate (Cwa/Cwb) due to its relatively high altitude. Guatemala City is generally very warm, almost springlike, throughout the year.

It occasionally gets hot during the dry season, although not as hot and humid as other cities in Central America at sea level. The hottest month is April. The rainy season extends from May to October, coinciding with the tropical storm and hurricane season in the western Atlantic Ocean and Caribbean Sea, while the dry season extends from November to April. The city can at times be windy, which also leads to lower ambient temperatures.

The city's average annual temperature ranges are 22–28 °C (71.6–82.4 °F) during the day and 12–17 °C (53.6–62.6 °F) at night; its average relative humidity is 82% in the morning and 58% in the evening; and its average dew point is 16 °C (60.8 °F).

Climate data for Guatemala City (La Aurora International Airport) 1991–2020 normals, extremes 1951–present
Month	Jan	Feb	Mar	Apr	May	Jun	Jul	Aug	Sep	Oct	Nov	Dec	Year
Record high °C (°F)	30.0 (86.0)	32.1 (89.8)	32.5 (90.5)	33.9 (93.0)	33.9 (93.0)	31.2 (88.2)	29.5 (85.1)	30.2 (86.4)	30.0 (86.0)	29.2 (84.6)	29.9 (85.8)	29.5 (85.1)	33.9 (93.0)
Mean daily maximum °C (°F)	24.6 (76.3)	26.5 (79.7)	28.0 (82.4)	28.4 (83.1)	27.2 (81.0)	25.1 (77.2)	25.4 (77.7)	25.5 (77.9)	24.8 (76.6)	24.4 (75.9)	24.1 (75.4)	24.3 (75.7)	25.7 (78.3)
Daily mean °C (°F)	18.2 (64.8)	19.3 (66.7)	20.8 (69.4)	21.6 (70.9)	21.4 (70.5)	20.6 (69.1)	20.3 (68.5)	20.4 (68.7)	20.0 (68.0)	19.6 (67.3)	18.8 (65.8)	18.1 (64.6)	19.9 (67.8)
Mean daily minimum °C (°F)	13.4 (56.1)	14.1 (57.4)	15.1 (59.2)	16.3 (61.3)	17.0 (62.6)	17.1 (62.8)	16.7 (62.1)	16.7 (62.1)	16.8 (62.2)	16.4 (61.5)	15.1 (59.2)	14.0 (57.2)	15.6 (60.1)
Record low °C (°F)	6.0 (42.8)	7.8 (46.0)	8.4 (47.1)	8.6 (47.5)	11.1 (52.0)	11.2 (52.2)	12.1 (53.8)	12.0 (53.6)	12.2 (54.0)	11.0 (51.8)	8.0 (46.4)	6.4 (43.5)	6.0 (42.8)
Average rainfall mm (inches)	2.1 (0.08)	4.3 (0.17)	4.1 (0.16)	29.5 (1.16)	154.2 (6.07)	279.1 (10.99)	207.8 (8.18)	225.2 (8.87)	242.0 (9.53)	170.5 (6.71)	30.1 (1.19)	5.2 (0.20)	1,354.1 (53.31)
Average rainy days	1.4	1.1	1.7	4.3	15.8	21.6	18.1	18.2	21.1	15.7	5.8	2.6	127.4
Average relative humidity (%)	73	70	67	66	71	79	78	78	81	80	76	75	75
Mean monthly sunshine hours	248.4	236.2	245.6	237.9	184.4	155.3	183.4	191.8	159.0	178.0	211.7	209.2	2,440.9
Percentage possible sunshine	70	72	66	63	46	39	46	49	43	49	61	60	55
Average ultraviolet index	10	12	12	12	12	12	12	12	12	12	10	9	11
Source 1: NOAA (Sunshine, Humidity & Extremes baseline data)
Source 2: Instituto Nacional de Sismologia, Vulcanologia, Meteorologia, e Hidrologia and Weather Atlas (uv index)

== Natural disasters ==
=== Volcanic activity ===
Four stratovolcanoes are visible from the city, two of them active. The nearest and most active is Pacaya, which at times erupts a considerable amount of ash. These volcanoes lie to the south of the Valle de la Ermita, providing a natural barrier between Guatemala City and the Pacific lowlands that define the southern regions of Guatemala. Agua, Fuego, Pacaya, and Acatenango comprise a line of 33 stratovolcanoes that stretches across the breadth of Guatemala, from the Salvadorian border to the Mexican border.

=== Earthquakes ===
Lying on the Ring of Fire, the Guatemalan highlands and the Valle de la Ermita are frequently shaken by large earthquakes. The last large tremor to hit the Guatemala City region occurred in the 1976, on the Motagua Fault, a left-lateral strike-slip fault that forms the boundary between the Caribbean Plate and the North American Plate. The 1976 event registered 7.5 on the moment magnitude scale. Smaller, less severe tremors are frequently felt in Guatemala City and environs.

=== Mudslides ===
Torrential downpours, similar to the more famous monsoons, occur frequently in the Valle de la Ermita during the rainy season, leading to flash floods that sometimes inundate the city. Due to these heavy rainfalls, some of the slums perched on the steep edges of the canyons that criss-cross the Valle de la Ermita are washed away and buried under mudslides, as in October 2005. Tropical waves, tropical storms and hurricanes sometimes strike the Guatemalan highlands, which also bring torrential rains to the Guatemala City region and trigger these deadly mudslides.

=== Sinkholes ===
In February 2007, a very large, deep circular hole with vertical walls opened in northeastern Guatemala City (14°39′2″N 90°29′25″W), killing five people. This sinkhole, which is classified by geologists as either a "piping feature" or "piping pseudokarst", was 100 metres (330 ft) deep, and apparently was created by fluid from a sewer eroding the loose volcanic ash, limestone, and other pyroclastic deposits that underlie Guatemala City. As a result, one thousand people were evacuated from the area. This piping feature has since been mitigated by City Hall by providing proper maintenance to the sewerage collection system, and plans to develop the site have been proposed. However, critics believe municipal authorities have neglected needed maintenance on the city's aging sewerage system, and have speculated that more dangerous piping features are likely to develop unless action is taken.

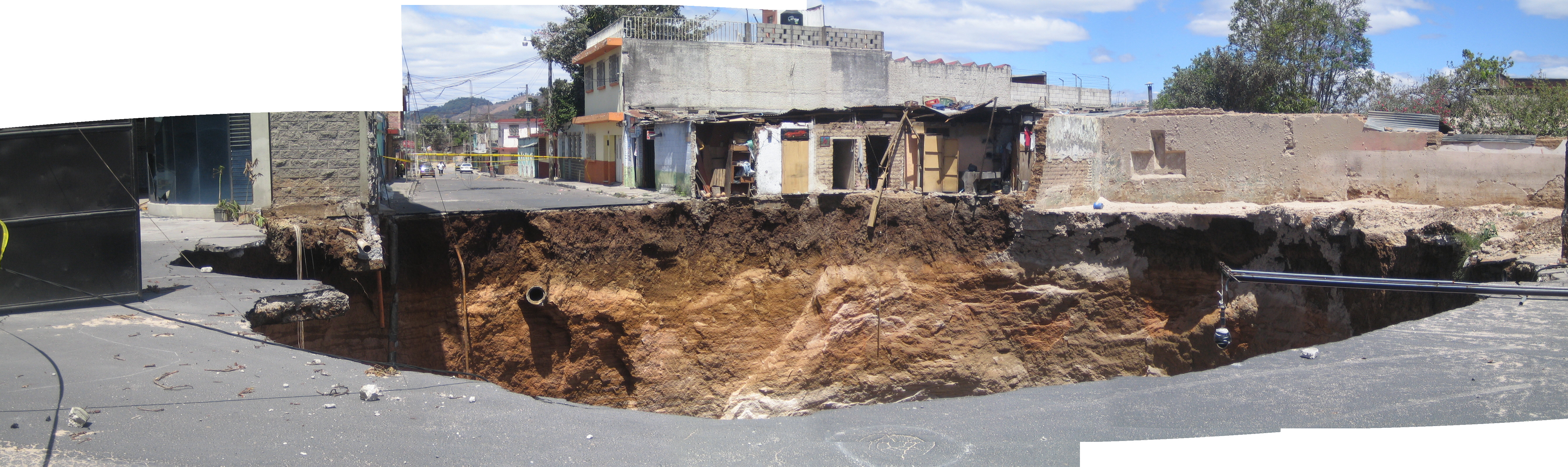
2007 sinkhole

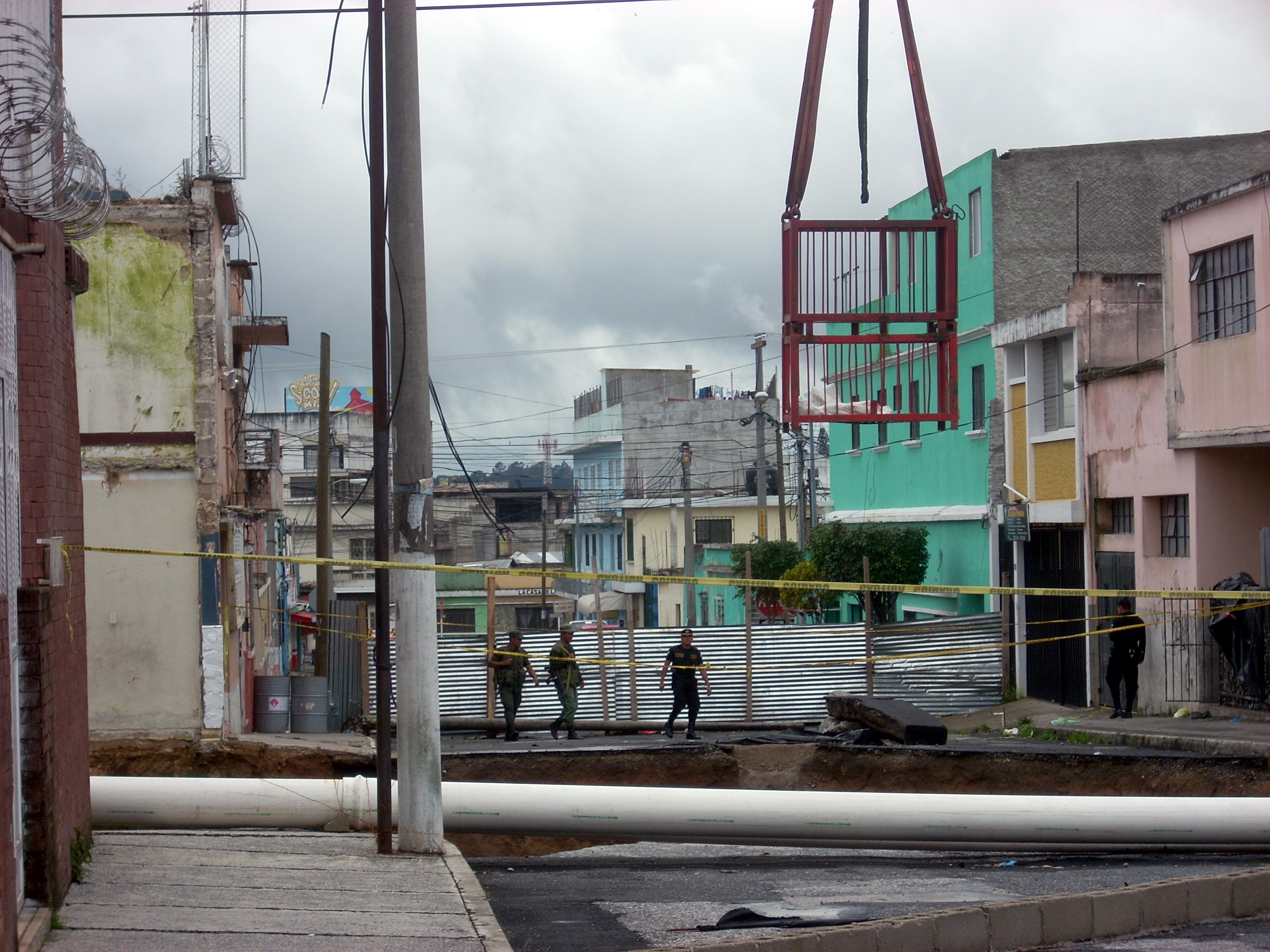
The 2010 sinkhole in Zona 2

Three years later, Tropical Storm Agatha caused a sinkhole to open in the north of Guatemala City, in Zona 2. The sinkhole was caused by strong winds and heavy rain brought by the storm, which left more than 300 bridges across the country destroyed. Two days before it made landfall, the Pacaya volcano erupted just 25 km south of Guatemala City, killing one news reporter who was covering the event and forcing 2,000 people to evacuate the area. The eruption exacerbated the situation and caused several lahars to form.

== Demographics ==
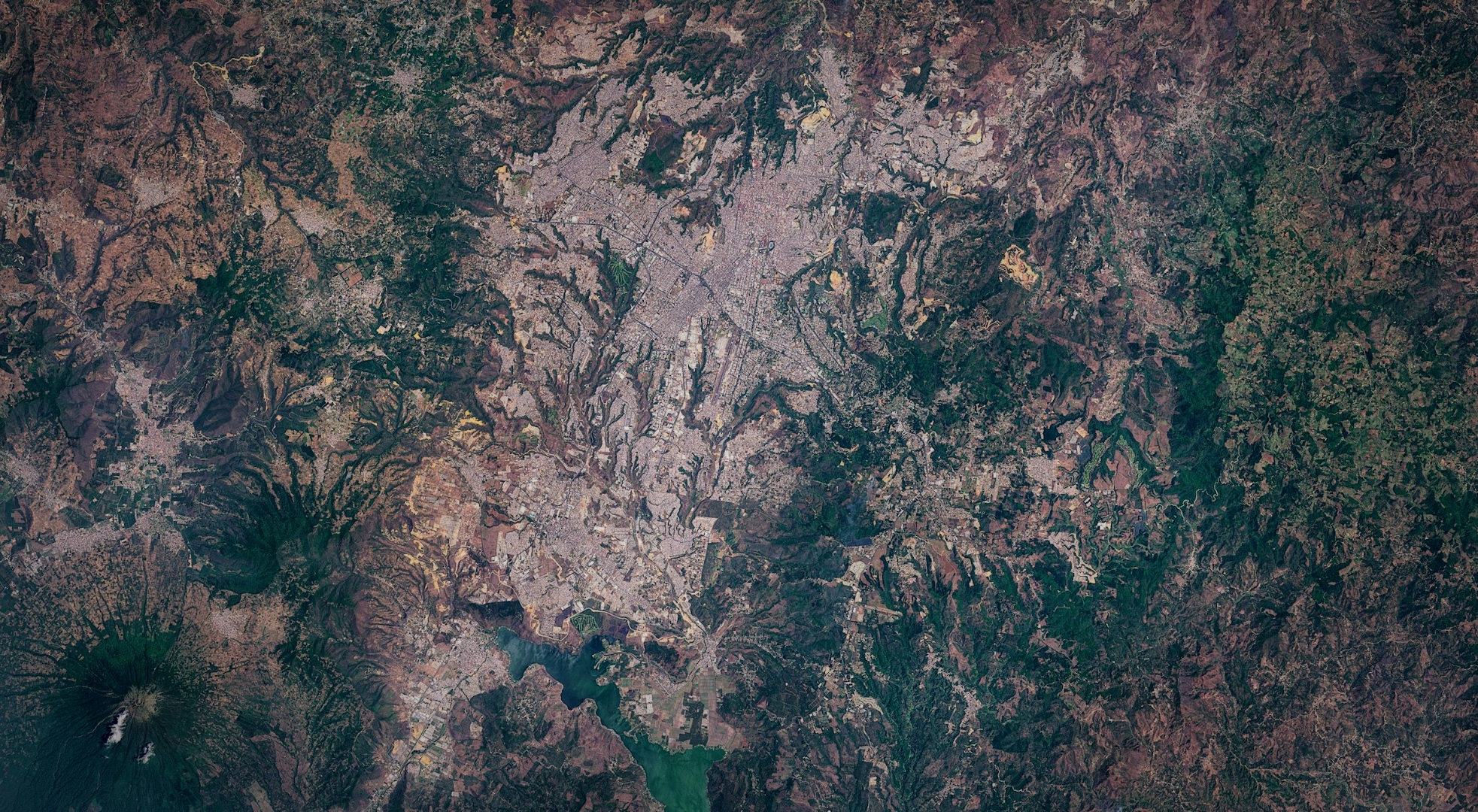
Aerial view of Guatemala City

It is estimated that the population of Guatemala City urban area is about 3 million. The growth of the city's population has been robust, abetted by the mass migration of Guatemalans from the rural hinterlands to the largest and most vibrant regional economy in Guatemala. Among inhabitants of Guatemala City, those of Spanish and Mestizo descent are the most numerous. Guatemala City also has sizable indigenous populations, divided among the 23 distinct Mayan groups present in Guatemala. The numerous Mayan languages are now spoken in certain quarters of Guatemala City, making the city a linguistically rich area. Foreigners and foreign immigrants comprise the final distinct group of Guatemala City inhabitants, representing a very small minority among the city's denizens.

Due to mass migration from impoverished rural districts wracked with political instability, Guatemala City's population has exploded since the 1970s, severely straining the existing bureaucratic and physical infrastructure of the city. As a result, chronic traffic congestion, shortages of safe potable water in some areas of the city, and a sudden and prolonged surge in crime have become perennial problems. The infrastructure, although continuing to grow and improve in some areas, is lagging in relation to the increasing population of rural migrants, who tend to be poorer.

== Communications ==
Guatemala City is headquarters to many communications and telecom companies, among them Tigo, Claro-Telgua, and Movistar-Telefónica. These companies also offer cable television, internet services and telephone access. Due to Guatemala City's large and concentrated consumer base in comparison to the rest of the country, these telecom and communications companies provide most of their services and offerings within the confines of the city. There are also seven local television channels, in addition to numerous international channels. The international channels range from children's programming, like Nickelodeon and the Disney Channel, to more adult offerings, such as E! and HBO. While international programming is dominated by entertainment from the United States, domestic programming is dominated by shows from Mexico. Due to its small and relatively income-restricted domestic market, Guatemala City produces very little in the way of its own programming outside of local news and sports.

== Economy and finance ==
Guatemala City, as the capital, is home to Guatemala's central bank, from which Guatemala's monetary and fiscal policies are formulated and promulgated. Guatemala City is also headquarters to numerous regional private banks, among them CitiBank, Banco Agromercantil, Banco Promerica, Banco Industrial, Banco GyT Continental, Banco de Antigua, Banco Reformador, Banrural, Grupo Financiero de Occidente, BAC Credomatic, and Banco Internacional.

Bank of Guatemala

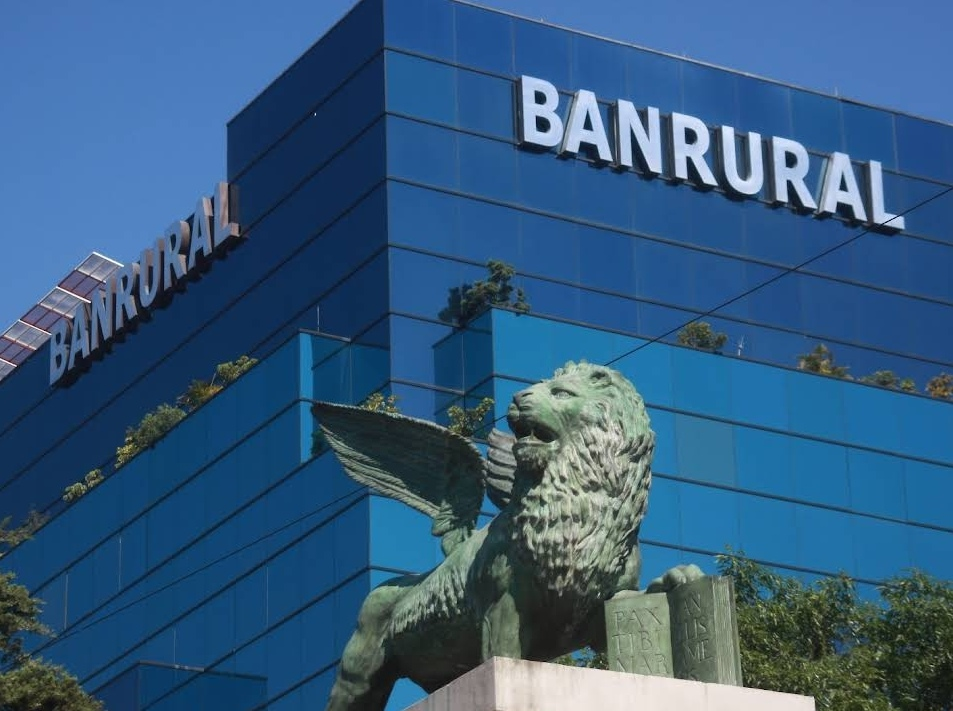
Banrural Bank

Pradera Zone.

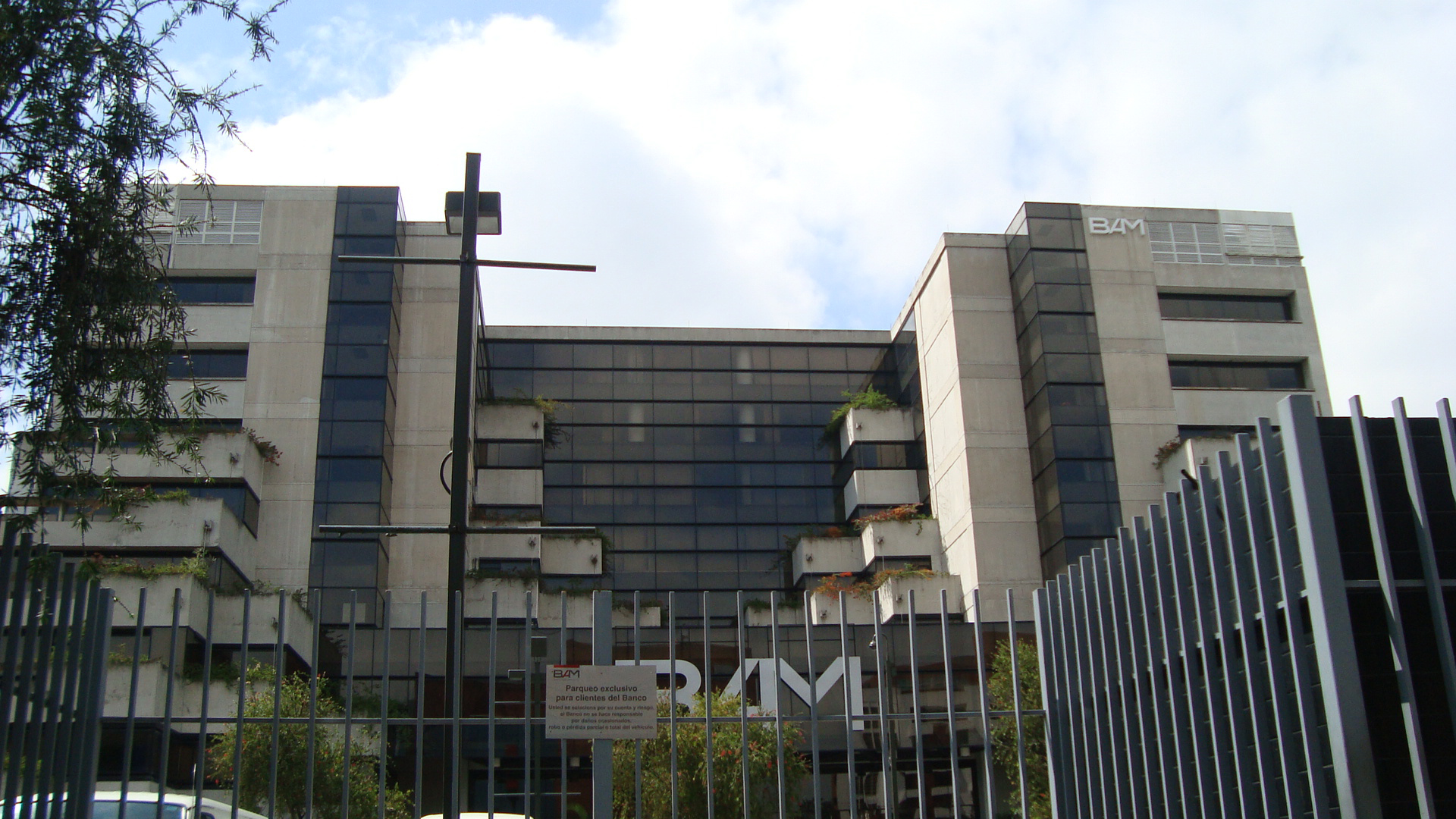
Agromercantil Bank

G&T Continental Bank

CHN Bank

== Places of interest by zones ==
Guatemala City is divided into 22 zones in accordance with the urban layout plan designed by Raúl Aguilar Batres. Each zone has its own streets and avenues, facilitating navigation within the city. Zones are numbered 1 through 25. However, numbers 20, 22 and 23 have not been designated to zones, thus these zones do not exist within the city proper.

Zone	Main places	Pictures	Pictures
Zone 1	Miguel Angel Asturias cultural center (includes the National Theater); Museums; Historic Downtown District; La Sexta Boulevard; National Palace; Biblioteca Nacional de Guatemala; National cathedral; Teatro Abril; Hogar Rafael Ayau; Centro Cultural de España en Guatemala	Guatemala National Theater	National cathedral
Zone 2	Hipódromo del Norte park; Guatemala's Relief Map; Enrique Torrebiarte Baseball Stadium; Simeón Cañas Avenue; Cervecería Centro Americana (national brewery)	Guatemala's relief map	Cervecería Centro Americana
Zone 3	Guatemala City General Cemetery; City dump	Guatemala City General Cemetery	City dump
Zone 4	Banco Industrial financial center; La Terminal Market; Cuatro Grados Norte borough: a cultural, gastronomic and technologically focused space; with housing, rental spaces, entertainment, and office spaces.	Banco Industrial financial center	
Zone 5	Doroteo Guamuch Flores National Stadium; Olympic Villa; La Limonada (Asentamiento)	National Stadium	
Zone 6	La Parroquia church (Note: Landmark next to which was held the first council meeting in the newly founded Guatemala City in 1776); Cementos Progreso Stadium	La Parroquia church, before 1917	
Zone 7	Kaminaljuyú Archeological Site; Erick Barrondo Sports Park; Peri-Roosevelt Mall; Megacentro Mall	Kaminal Juyu	
Zone 8	Temple of the Divine Providence (Parroquia La Divina Providencia; Salesian catholic church)	Temple of the Divine Providence	
Zone 9	Torre del Reformador; Parque de la Industria; Avenida Reforma; Plazuela españa; Reloj de Flores	Torre del Reformador	Plazuela españa
Zone 10	Zona Viva; Universidad Francisco Marroquín; Ixchel Museum of Indigenous Textiles and Clothing; Universidad Galileo; Museo Popol Vuh; Jardín Botánico, a botanical garden; Upscale malls	Zona Viva at night	Francisco Marroquin university
Zone 11	Museo de Miraflores; Miraflores Mall; Hotel Tikal Futura; Hospital Roosevelt; Centro Universitario Metropolitano de la Universidad de San Carlos; Calzada Roosevelt (highway)	Calzada Roosevelt	Tikal Futura
Zone 12	University of San Carlos central campus; Mundo Petapa amusement park	University of San Carlos Central Campus	Mundo Petapa
Zone 13	Museo Nacional de Arqueología y Etnología; Museo Nacional de Arte Moderno "Carlos Mérida"; Museo Nacional de Historia Natural; Parque Zoológico La Aurora; La Aurora International Airport	La Aurora International Airport	Museo Nacional de Arqueología y Etnología
Zone 14	Centro Recreativo Universitario Los Arcos; Avenida Las Américas; Europlaza	Europlaza	Avenida Las Américas
Zone 15	Church of Jesus Christ of Latter-day Saints Guatemala City Temple; Universidad Del Valle de Guatemala	Vista Hermosa, zona 15	Latter Day Saints Guatemala City Temple
Zone 16	Universidad Rafael Landívar; Guatemala Military Hospital; Universidad Panamericana de Guatemala; Paseo Cayalá	Universidad Rafael Landívar	Paseo Cayalá, a new district with various landmarks
Zone 17	Metronorte Shopping Center; Portales Shopping Center; Kern's Factory; Centra Norte	Centra Norte	

== Transportation ==
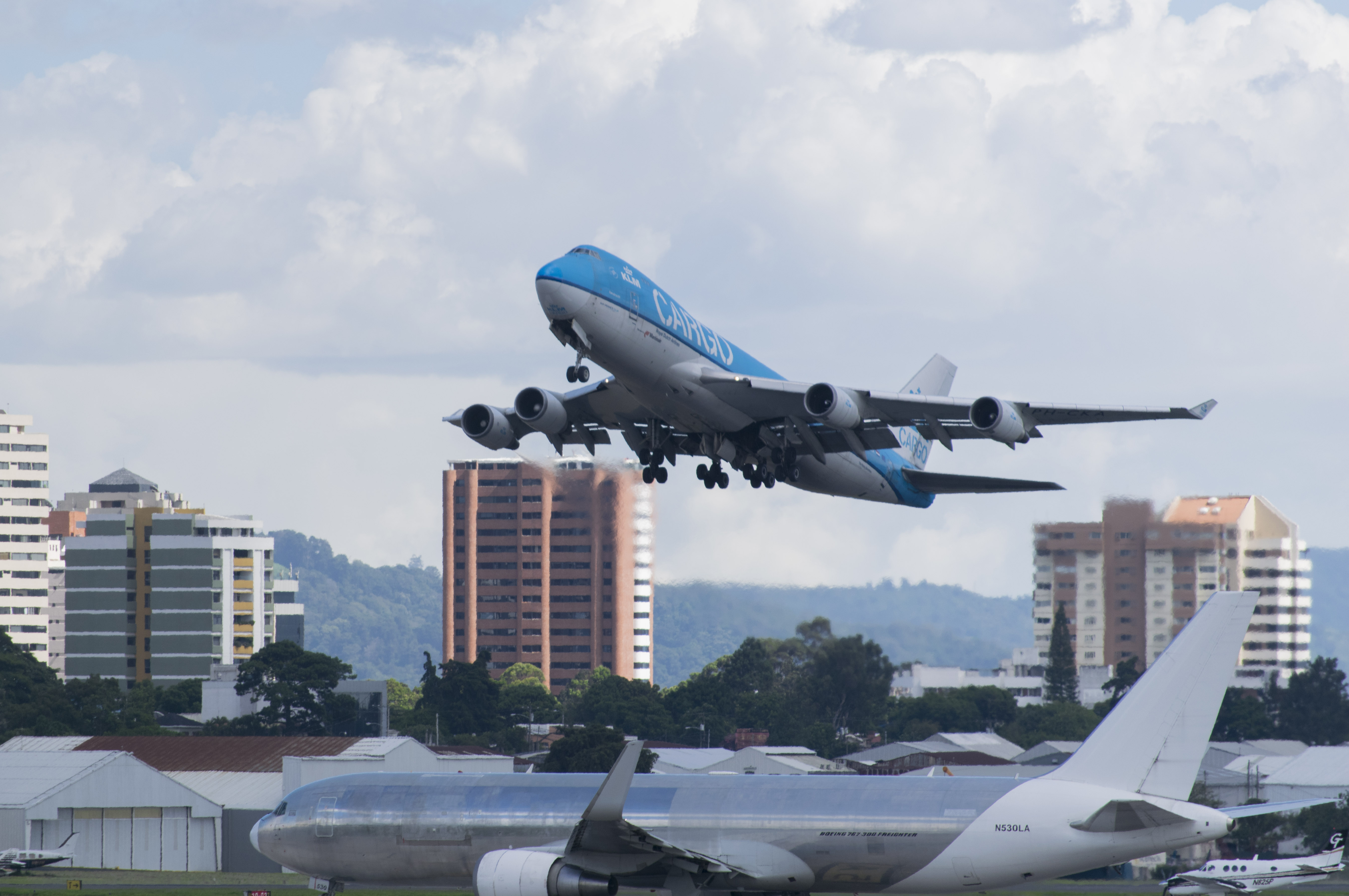
La Aurora International Airport

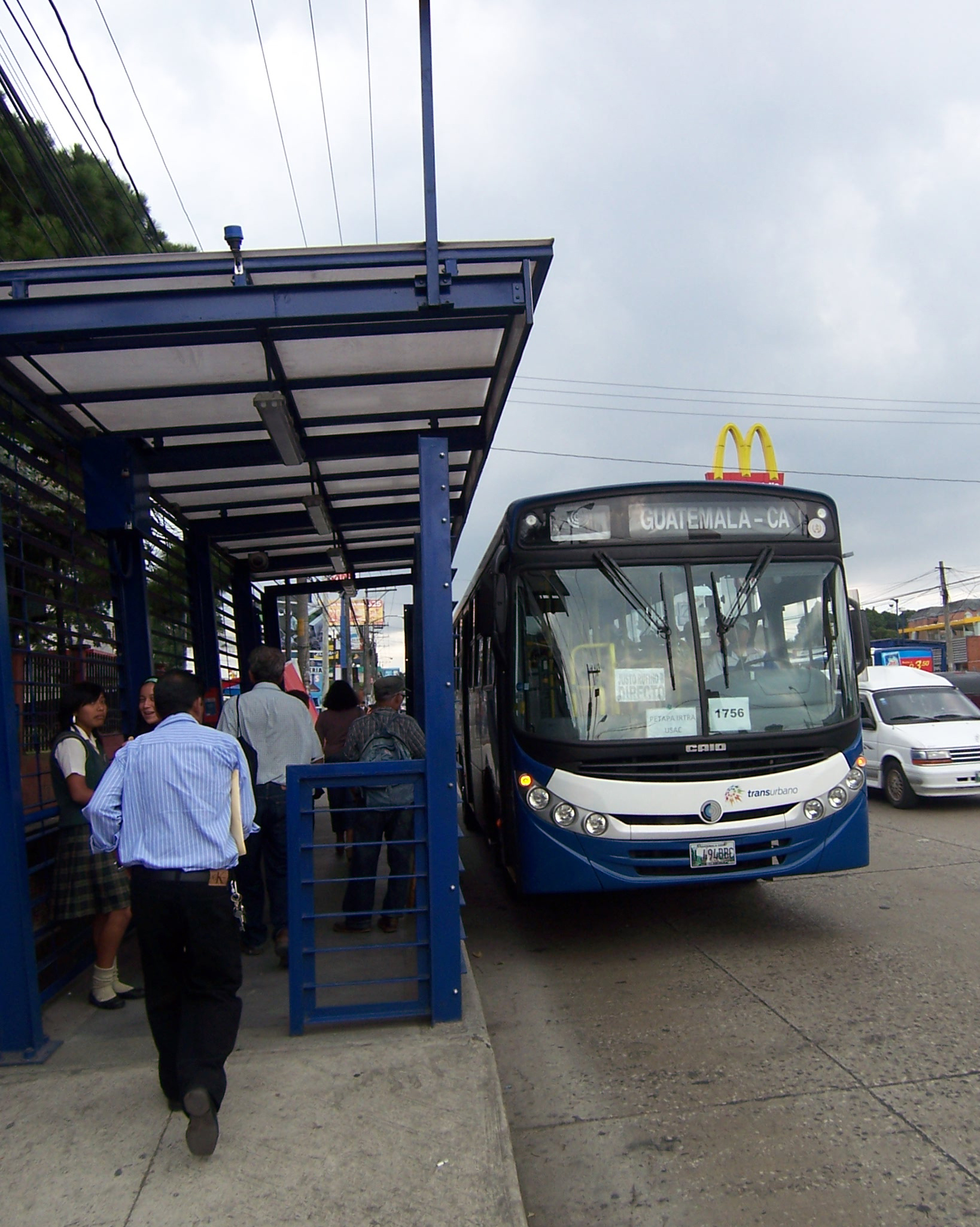
Transurbano

- Renovated and expanded, La Aurora International Airport lies to the south of the city center. La Aurora serves as Guatemala's principal air hub.
- Public transport is provided by buses and supplemented by a BRT system. The three main highways that bisect and serve Guatemala start in the city (CA9 Transoceanic Highway – Puerto San Jose to Puerto Santo Tomas de Castilla –, CA1 Panamerican Highway – from the Mexican border to Salvadorian border – and to Peten). Construction of freeways and underpasses by the municipal government, the implementation of reversible lanes during peak rush-hour traffic, as well as the establishment of the Department of Metropolitan Transit Police (PMT), has helped improve traffic flow in the city. Despite these municipal efforts, the Guatemala City metropolitan area still faces growing traffic congestion.
- A BRT (bus rapid transit) system called Transmetro, consisting of special-purpose lanes for high-capacity buses, began operating in 2007, and aimed to improve traffic flow in the city through the implementation of an efficient mass transit system. The system consists of five lines. It is expected to be expanded around 10 lines, with some over-capacity expected lines being considered for Light Metro or Heavy Metro.

Traditional buses are now required to discharge passengers at transfer stations at the city's edge to board the Transmetro. This is being implemented as new Transmetro lines become established. In conjunction with the new mass transit implementation in the city, there is also a prepaid bus card system called Transurbano that is being implemented in the metro area to limit cash handling for the transportation system. A new fleet of buses tailored for this system has been purchased from a Brazilian firm.

A light rail line known as Metro Riel is proposed.

== Universities and schools ==
Guatemala City is home to ten universities, among them the oldest institution of higher education in Central America, the University of San Carlos of Guatemala. Founded in 1676, the Universidad de San Carlos is older than all North American universities except for Harvard University.

The other nine institutions of higher education to be found in Guatemala City include the Universidad Mariano Gálvez, the Universidad Panamericana, the Universidad Mesoamericana, the Universidad Rafael Landivar, the Universidad Francisco Marroquín, the Universidad del Valle, the Universidad del Istmo, Universidad Galileo, Universidad da Vinci, and the Universidad Rural. Whereas these nine named universities are private, the Universidad de San Carlos remains the only public institution of higher learning.

== Sports ==
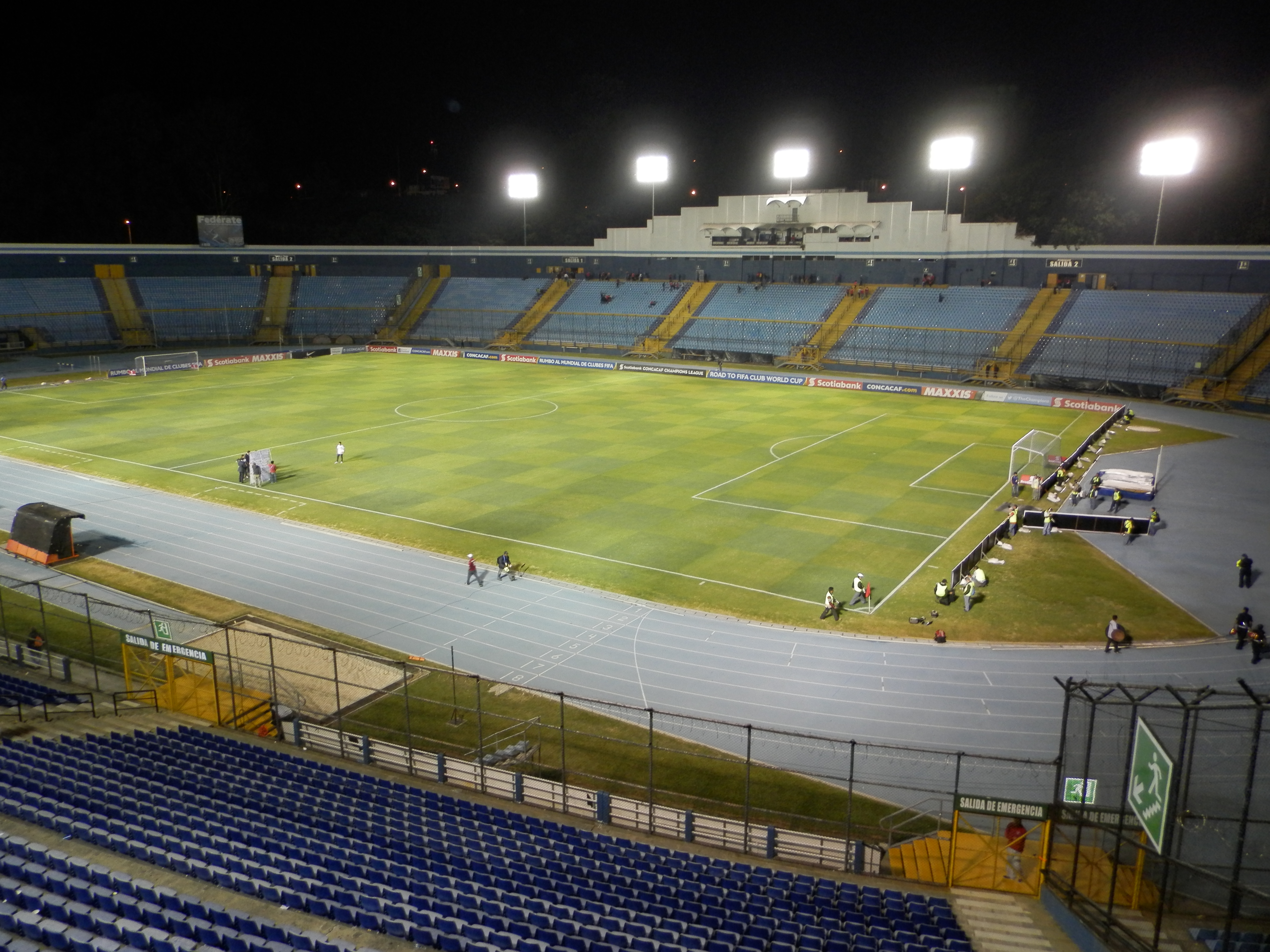
Estadio Doroteo Guamuch Flores

Guatemala City possesses several sportsgrounds and is home to many sports clubs. Football is the most popular sport, with CSD Municipal, Aurora, and Comunicaciones being the main clubs.

The Estadio Doroteo Guamuch Flores, located in the Zone 5 of the city, is the largest stadium in the country, followed in capacity by the Estadio Israel Barrios , Estadio del Ejército, and Estadio El Trébol. An important multi-functional hall is the Domo Polideportivo de la CDAG.

The city has hosted several promotional functions and some international sports events: in 1950 it hosted the VI Central American and Caribbean Games, and in 2000 the FIFA Futsal World Championship. On 4 July 2007 the International Olympic Committee gathered in Guatemala City and voted Sochi to become the host for the 2014 Winter Olympics and Paralympics. In April 2010, it hosted the XIVth Pan-American Mountain Bike Championships.

Guatemala City hosted the 2008 edition of the CONCACAF Futsal Championship, played at the Domo Polideportivo from 2 to 8 June 2008.

The 2024 Senior Pan American Championships will be held in the city from 7 to 9 June at Gimnasio Nacional Teodoro Palacios Flores.

== Panoramic views of Guatemala City ==
=== 1875 ===
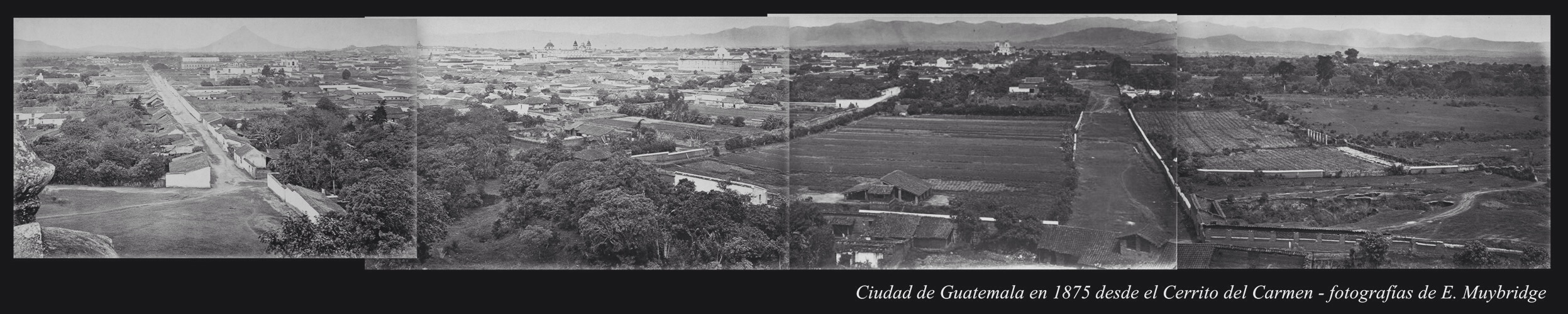
Guatemala City skyline in 1875, by Eadweard Muybridge

=== 2020 ===
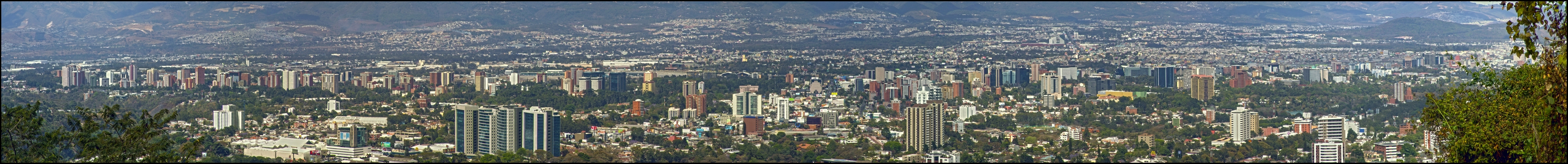
Panoramic view of Guatemala City
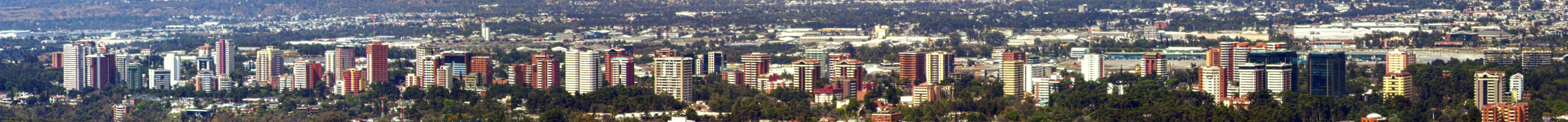
Skyline of the zone 14 or residential buildings zone

== International relations ==
=== International organizations with headquarters in Guatemala City ===
- Central American Parliament

=== Twin towns – sister cities ===
Guatemala City is twinned with:

City	Jurisdiction	Country	Year
Caracas	Capital District	Venezuela	1969
San Salvador	San Salvador	El Salvador	1979
Madrid	Madrid	Spain	1983
Hollywood	Florida	United States	1987
Lima	Lima	Peru	1987
Santiago de Chile	Metropolitan Santiago	Chile	1991
Saltillo	Coahuila	Mexico	1993
La Habana	La Habana	Cuba	1997
Bogotá	Distrito Capital	Colombia	1997
San Pedro Sula	Cortés	Honduras	1999
Santa Cruz de Tenerife	Santa Cruz de Tenerife	Spain	2002
San José	San José	Costa Rica	2005
Ciudad de Panamá	Panamá	Panama	2005
Taipei	Northern Taiwan	Republic of China	2007
Managua	Managua	Nicaragua	2008
Beijing	Beijing	China	2009
Providence	Rhode Island	United States	2016

== Notable people ==
- Manuel Colom Argueta, former mayor of Guatemala City and politician
- Álvaro Arzú, former President of Guatemala and six times mayor of Guatemala City
- Miguel Ángel Asturias, writer and diplomat, Nobel Prize Laureate
- Raúl Aguilar Batres, engineer, creator of Guatemala City's system of avenue/street notation
- María Dolores Bedoya, Central American independence activist
- Marvin Ceballos, professional footballer
- Sergio Custodio, professor and writer in logic and metaphysics
- Toti Fernández, triathlete and ultramarathon runner
- Alejandro Giammattei, former President of Guatemala
- Juan José Gutiérrez, CEO of Pollo Campero and on the board of directors of Corporación Multi Inversiones. He has been featured on the cover of Newsweek as Super CEO and named one of the Ten Big Thinkers for Big Business.
- Nicholas Hagen, professional footballer
- Ted Hendricks, Oakland Raiders NFL Hall of Fame Linebacker, 4-time Super Bowl Champion.
- Jorge de León, performance artist
- Zipacná de León (1948–2002), painter
- Ronald MacKay, YouTuber and voice actor
- Carlos Mérida, painter
- Jimmy Morales, former President of Guatemala
- Gaby Moreno, singer-songwriter
- Marco Pappa, former professional footballer
- Carlos Peña, singer, winner of Latin American Idol 2007
- Juan Carlos Plata, former professional footballer
- Luis Oliva, actor, singer and director
- Georgina Pontaza, actress and artistic director of the Teatro Abril and Teatro Fantasía
- Fernando Quevedo, theoretical physicist, professor of High Energy Physics at the University of Cambridge
- Rodolfo Robles, physician; discovered onchocercosis "Robles' Disease"
- Stheven Robles, professional footballer
- Fabiola Rodas, winner of The Third TV Azteca's Desafio de Estrellas, 2nd place in The Last Generation of La Academia
- Carlos Ruíz, former professional footballer
- Gabriela Asturias Ruiz, neuroscientist
- Rodrigo Saravia, professional footballer
- Shery, singer-songwriter
- Federico Urruela, recipient of the Order of Antonio José de Irisarri
- Jaime Viñals, mountaineer; scaled seven highest peaks in the world
- Luis von Ahn, computer scientist, founder of Duolingo, CAPTCHA's creator and researcher at Carnegie Mellon University
- Lorena Cabnal

== See also ==
- List of places in Guatemala

== Bibliography ==
- Almengor, Oscar Guillermo (1994). "La Nueva Guatemala de la Asunción y los terremotos de 1917–18". Ciudad de Guatemala (in Spanish). Guatemala: Centro de estudios urbanos y regionales-USAC.
- Assardo, Luis (2010). "Llueve ceniza y piedras del Volcán de Pacaya". El Periódico. Guatemala. Archived from the original on 4 July 2014.
- Baily, John (1850). Central America; Describing Each of the States of Guatemala, Honduras, Salvador, Nicaragua, and Costa Rica. London: Trelawney Saunders. p. 72. Archived from the original on 3 October 2013.
- Barrios Vital, Jenny Ivette (2006). Restauración y revitalización del complejo arquitectónico de la Recolección (PDF) (Thesis) (in Spanish). Guatemala: University of San Carlos of Guatemala. Archived (PDF) from the original on 6 November 2014.
- Bascome Jones, J.; Scoullar, William T.; Soto Hall, Máximo (1915). El Libro azul de Guatemala (in Spanish). Searcy & Pfaff. "relato é historia sobre la vida de las personas más prominentes; historia condensada de la república; artículos especiales sobre el comercio, agricultura y riqueza mineral, basado sobre las estadísticas oficiales"
- Comisión para el Esclarecimiento Histórico (1999). "Atentados contra la libertad". Programa de Ciencia y Derechos Humanos, Asociación Americana del Avance de la Ciencia (in Spanish). IV, 2. Guatemala: memoria del silencio. Archived from the original on 22 May 2011.
- Comisión para el Esclarecimiento Histórico: Vol. IV (1999). "Atentados contra sedes municipales". Programa de Ciencia y Derechos Humanos, Asociación Americana del Avance de la Ciencia (in Spanish). Guatemala: memoria del silencio. Archived from the original on 6 May 2013.
- Conkling, Alfred R. (1884). Appleton's guide to Mexico, including a chapter on Guatemala, and a complete English-Spanish vocabulary. Nueva York: D. Appleton and Company. Archived from the original on 23 January 2015.
- Dary Fuentes, Claudia (1994). "Una ciudad que empezaba a crecer". Revista Crónica, suplemento Revolución (in Spanish). Guatemala: Editorial Anahté.
- Diario de Navarra (2010). "El volcán Pacaya continúa activo y obliga a seguir con evacuaciones". Diario de Navarra (in Spanish). Archived from the original on 31 July 2014.
- El País (2010). "Socavón causado por la tormenta Agatha". El País (in Spanish). Madrid, Spain. Archived from the original on 18 February 2012.
- El Periódico (31 January 2012). "Quema de embajada española". elPeriódico (in Spanish). Archived from the original on 30 October 2013.
- Figueroa, Luis (2011). "Bombazo en el Palacio Nacional". Luis Figueroa Blog (in Spanish). Archived from the original on 26 June 2014.
- González Davison, Fernando (2008). La montaña infinita;Carrera, caudillo de Guatemala (in Spanish). Guatemala: Artemis y Edinter. ISBN 978-84-89452-81-7.
- Guateantaño (17 October 2011). "Parques y plazas antiguas de Guatemala". Guatepalabras Blogspot. Guatemala. Archived from the original on 27 January 2015.
- Halliday, W.R. (2007). "Pseudokarst in the 21st century". Journal of Cave and Karst Studies. 69 (1): 103–113.
- INE (2013). "Caracterización Departamental, Guatemala 2012" (PDF). Instituto Nacional de Estadística (in Spanish). Guatemala: Gobierno de Guatemala. Archived from the original (PDF) on 25 June 2014.
- Hernández de León, Federico (1959). "El capítulo de las efemérides". Diario La Hora (in Spanish). Guatemala.
- Hernández de León, Federico (1930). El libro de las efemérides (in Spanish). Vol. III. Guatemala: Tipografía Sánchez y de Guise.
- La Hora (2013). "Una crónica impactante en el aniversario de la quema de la Embajada de España tras 33 años de impunidad". Diario La Hora (in Spanish). Archived from the original on 7 December 2013.
- La otra memoria histórica (5 December 2011). "Guatemala, viudas y huérfanos que dejó el comunismo". La otra memoria histórica (in Spanish). Guatemala. Archived from the original on 7 December 2013.
- Milla y Vidaurre, José (1980). Cuadros de Costumbres. Textos Modernos (in Spanish). Guatemala: Escolar Piedra Santa.
- Moncada Maya, José Omar (n.d.). "En torno a la destrucción de la ciudad de Guatemala, 1773. Una carta del ingeniero militar Antonio Marín". Ub.es (in Spanish). Archived from the original on 23 June 2003.
- Morán Mérida, Amanda (1994). "Movimientos de pobladores en la Ciudad de Guatemala (1944–1954)" (PDF). Boletín del CEUR-USAC (in Spanish) (23). Guatemala: Centro de estudios urbanos y regionales-USAC. Archived from the original (PDF) on 18 October 2014.
- Mundo Chapín (2013). "La Aurora y el Hipódromo del Sur". Mundo Chapín. Guatemala. Archived from the original on 30 March 2014.
- Municipalidad de Guatemala (2007). "Conmemoración de los doscientos treinta años de fundación de la Ciudad de Guatemala". Boletín de la Municipalidad de Guatemala. Archived from the original on 20 March 2013.
- Municipalidad de Guatemala (2008). "Plan de Ordenamiento Territorial, Ciudad de Guatemala" (in Spanish). Archived from the original on 18 September 2009.
- Municipalidad de Guatemala (August 2008a). "Paso a desnivel de Tecún Umán". Segmento cultural de la Municipalidad de Guatemala (in Spanish). Archived from the original on 24 February 2011.
- Municipalidad de Guatemala (2014). "Mi barrio querido, Ciudad de Guatemala" (in Spanish). Guatemala City. Archived from the original on 28 August 2008.
- Museo Ixchel (2008). "Museo Ixchel". Museo Ixchel del traje indígena (in Spanish). Archived from the original on 2 February 2008.
- Population data (2012). "Guatemala population". Population data. Archived from the original on 26 December 2013.
- Prensa Libre (6 September 1980). "Avalancha terrorista en contra de la manifestación de mañana; poder público y transporte extraurbano blancos de ataque". Prensa Libre (in Spanish). Guatemala.
- Reilly, Michael (2 June 2010). "Don't Call the Guatemala Sinkhole a Sinkhole". Discovery News. Archived from the original on 5 June 2010.
- Sharer, Robert J.; Traxler, Loa P. (2006). The Ancient Maya (6th (fully revised) ed.). Stanford, CA: Stanford University Press. ISBN 0-8047-4817-9. OCLC 57577446.
- Sydney Morning Herald (2010). "Hole that swallowed a three-story building". Sydney Morning Herald. Archived from the original on 3 July 2014.
- Walker, Peter (2010). "Tropical Storm Agatha blows a hole in Guatemala City". The Guardian. London, UK. Archived from the original on 19 March 2013.
- Waltham, T. (2008). "Sinkhole hazard case histories in karst terrains". Quarterly Journal of Engineering Geology and Hydrogeology. 41 (3): 291–300. Bibcode:2008QJEGH..41..291W. doi:10.1144/1470-9236/07-211. S2CID 128585380. Archived from the original on 13 February 2009.
- Woodward Jr., Ralph Lee (2002). "Rafael Carrera y la creación de la República de Guatemala, 1821–1871". Serie Monográfica (in Spanish) (12). CIRMA y Plumsock Mesoamerican Studies. ISBN 0-910443-19-X. Archived from the original on 1 March 2019.
- Woodward Jr., Ralph Lee (1993). Rafael Carrera and the Emergence of the Republic of Guatemala, 1821–1871. Athens, Georgia: University of Georgia Press. ISBN 9780820343600. Archived from the original on 4 March 2016.
