= Ronald Mackay =

Ronald Mackay may refer to:

- Kim Mackay (Ronald William Gordon Mackay, 1902–1960), Australian-born British politician
- Ronald Mackay, Lord Eassie (born 1945) Scottish lawyer and judge
- Ronald MacKay (born 1975), Guatemalan YouTuber and voice actor
