= Cuatro Grados Norte =

Cuatro Grados Norte, four degrees north, is a cultural district located in zone 4 in Guatemala City. It was a project of the municipality set in motion thanks to the involvement of Fundación Crecer Guatemala. A diverse group of Guatemalans saw Zone 4 turn into a dangerous neighborhood and decided to convert this area into an attractive pedestrian area in 2002. Additionally, many green areas were created. Today, the district also features bars, restaurants, shopping and cultural activities and has become one of the city's trendy and open minded areas, competing with Zona Viva in zone 10..
