= Torre Premier Club =

Coordinates: 14°37′21″N 90°33′14″W

Torre Premier Club

Premiere Club is a skyscraper in Guatemala City, Guatemala located at 4a. Avenida Final x Calle 23, in Zone14. As of 2020, it is the tallest building in Guatemala at 100.75 m (330.5 ft). The building has 31 floors and was completed in 1999.
