= Georgina Pontaza =

Guatemalan singer and actor (born 1976)

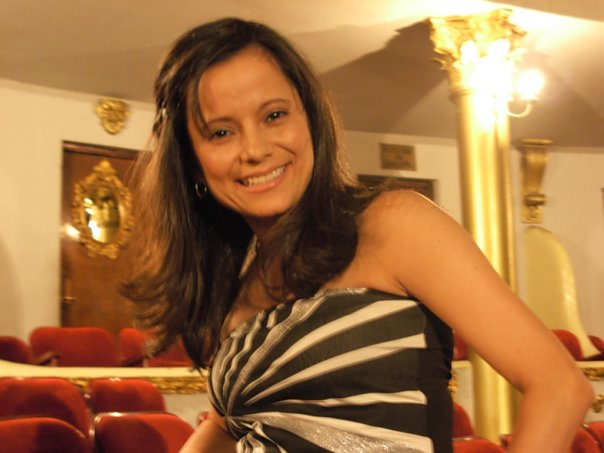
- Born: Karla Georgina Pontaza Ávila; 15 January 1974; Guatemala
- Occupation: Actress
- Years active: 1981–present

Georgina Pontaza (born 1974) is a Guatemalan actress, singer, choreographer, theater director and producer. She has done work on television and radio in addition to live theater. She serves as the artistic director of both the Teatro Abril and Teatro Fantasía IRTRA in Guatemala City.

== Biography ==
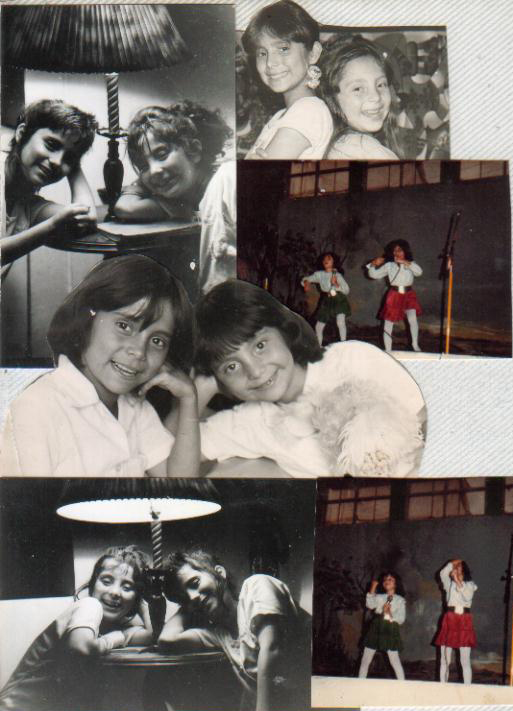
The Pontaza Sisters collage

Karla Georgina Pontaza Ávila was born 15 January 1974 in Guatemala. At a very young age, she was encouraged to entertain in a children's choir founded by her grandmother, soprano Carmen Morales Ávila. From age 5, she performed, and by age 9, Pontaza and her sister Silvia, who was 8 years old, formed a singing and dancing duo, known as the "Pontaza Sisters". They performed with the Kodaly Group under the direction of Alma Monsanto in the production of Little Orphan Annie, in 1985, followed by José el Soñador, La Novicia Rebelde (The Sound of Music), Gatos (Cats), Brillantina (Glitter), El Violinista en el Tejado (Fiddler on the Roof), Evita, and many others.

She has a degree in both advertising and dramatic arts, having graduated with the latter designation in 2009. Since the mid-1990s, she has taught children's theater. She has recorded many voices for both television and radio, and was the artistic director of TV Chiquirrines Club.

Pontaza had her directorial debut in 1994, in the work El reino de Bom Bom (The Kingdom of Bom Bom), with the Argentine singer Luis Aguilé. In 1995 she started choreographing and directing children's theater. In the early 2000s she began directing with the producer Pedro Luis Soto at the Teatro Abril. By 2006, as artistic director, Pontaza had staged many classic children's theatrical performances. In 2012, she became the artistic director of the newly opened Teatro Fantasía (Fantasy Theater) at the Instituto de Recreación de los Trabajadores (IRTRA) (Institute of Worker's Recreation) in Guatemala City.

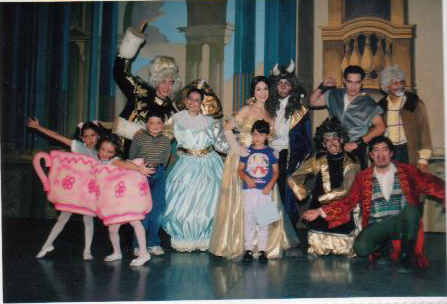
Pontaza and Rey Leon in Beauty and the Beast

Though best known for children's performances, Pontaza has also worked with classic productions like Entremeses de Cervantes by Miguel de Cervantes and Cuadros de Costumbres by Guatemalan José Milla y Vidaurre.

== Awards ==
- 1994, Lifetime Achievement for Children's Theater, from the Magazine of the Nation for the Sociedad Dante Alighieri

== Productions ==
=== Acting ===
- Peter Pan (1994, 1997, 2000)
- Pinocchio
- The Diary of Anne Frank
- The Wizard of Oz

=== Directing ===
- The Little Mermaid
- The Beauty and the Beast
- Snow White
- Aladdin
- Fuenteovejuna
- Los árboles mueren de pie
- Leyendas de Guatemala
