= Sergio Custodio =

Guatamelan philosopher (1947–2020)

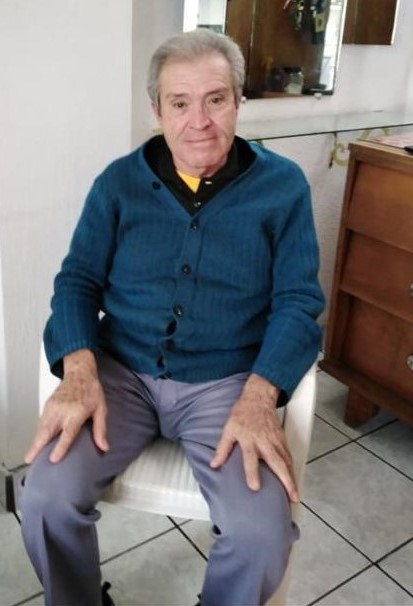
- Born: January 7, 1947; Guatemala, Guatemala City
- Died: July 24, 2020 (aged 73); Guatemala, Guatemala City

Philosophical work
- Institutions: University San Carlos of Guatemala
- Language: Spanish
- Notable works: Fenomenología de la cantidad y la cualidad y la unidad categorial del ente. (1989) Historia y problemas de teoría del conocimiento. (1991) Metafísica de la estructura formal de la posibilidad pura. (2017)
- Philosophy, Logic

Sergio Alfredo Custodio Contreras (January 7, 1947 – July 24, 2020) was a professor, writer and Humanist dedicated to Philosophy in Guatemala. Among his best-known works are textbooks on formal, inductive and analytical Logic, in addition to his books on Epistemology. He has abundant publications for the diffusion of Philosophy and the introduction of it to High school and University students. He stands out especially for his works on Metaphysics.

== Life ==
He was born in Guatemala City on January 7, 1947, as the son of Hilda Contreras and Alfredo Custodio. He was the oldest of 6 brothers and a descendant of a family of Italian immigrants. His initial studies were made with the Order of the Salesians of Don Bosco, with whom he would always maintain a close relationship, teaching philosophy, especially Logic and Metaphysics, courses in their seminaries.

After finishing his high school studies, he traveled to Chicago, United States, where he lived for several years. These were years he dedicated to work. He served in the US Army during the Vietnam War. After this experience, he decided to return to Guatemala where he began his studies of philosophy at the Faculty of Humanities of the University of San Carlos. At this time, he was taught by well-known Professors such as José Mata Gavidia and Rodolfo Ortíz Amiel.

He was awarded the Cum Laude for his undergraduate work. He then became a professor of philosophy at the Faculty of Humanities of said university, where he worked for about 30 years.

=== Academic life ===
In addition to teaching courses in History of Philosophy at the Faculty of Humanities, he worked in the Faculties of Pharmacy and Engineering teaching courses in Logic and Philosophy of Science. He was also one of the first teachers to work in the extensions of the Faculty of Humanities in other cities in Guatemala.

He worked in several universities in Guatemala, like Mariano Galvez University, Francisco Marroquín University and Mesoamericana University.

At the same time, he worked as a teacher at the Don Bosco Salesians' Seminary of Theology and Philosophy, where he taught until the moment of his death. He actively collaborated with conferences and courses in different institutions of the country, such as the National Institute of Forensic Sciences of Guatemala (Inacif) and the Public Ministry (MP). In 1985 he was appointed as vice president at the College of Humanities.

== Work and publications ==
Among these are books dedicated to the study of Logic. These books offer different exercises in formal, analytical and inductive Logic, in the way it is used in Natural Sciences and the scientific method. It is especially aimed at students of Chemistry, Biology and Medicine. They are not only used in several universities in Guatemala, but also in colleges and education institutes. Until its publication, there were no textbooks on these disciplines for students in Guatemala.

He also wrote textbooks on Epistemology. These are also intended to didactically introduce students to the fundamental problems of Epistemology from a historical perspective and aim to develop and cultivate the student's analytical skills and broaden their philosophical culture through questions, research topics, and analysis exercises presented in those books.

=== Publications ===
Custodio collaborated for many years with various magazines, such as Cuadernos de Filosofía and Revista de Filosofía of the Faculty of Humanities. He also worked with newspapers like El Imparcial by César Brañas.Some of his best-known works in these media are listed below:

Revista de Filosofía, Facultad de Humanidades:

- no. 5 (2018) – La educación como ectipo.
- no. 6 (2019) – Calidad de la intuición estética y la certeza dianoética.

His work is also known in Costa Rica, where his essays got published by Universities:

- Revista de Filosofía, Universidad de Costa Rica (1977) – Lo exclusivo del hombre en el Popol Vuh

=== Books ===
He wrote plenty of books for philosophy. The most important books are the following:

- Introducción a la lógica. Guatemala, Editorial Oscar de León Palacios, 1986, 2002. ISBN 978-9929-8100-6-8.
- Fenomenología de la cualidad y la cantidad. Guatemala, Editorial Universitario, 1989
- La Filosofía una aventura de la humanidad. Guatemala, Editorial Oscar de León Palacios, 2010. ISBN 978-9929-8017-7-6
- Nociones de teoría del conocimiento. Guatemala, Editorial Oscar de León Palacios, 2008.
- Principos de inducción y analogía. Guatemala, Editorial Oscar de León Palacios, 2010. ISBN 978-9929-8017-0-7
- Fenomenología de la cantidad y la cualidad y de la unidad categorial del ente. Guatemala, Editorial Universitaria, 2012. ISBN 978-9929-556-23-2
- La Metafísica. Guatemala, Editorial Oscar de León Palacios. ISBN 978-9929-642-02-7
- Metafísica de la Estructura formal de la posibilidad, Guatemala, Editorial Oscar de León Palacios. 2013. ISBN 978-9929-556-73-7
- Historia del conocimiento filosófico. Guatemala, Editorial Universitaria, 2017. ISBN 978-9929-556-34-8
- Metafísica de la estructura formal de la posibilidad pura. Guatemala, Editorial Universitaria, 2017. ISBN 978-9929-642-09-6

== Legacy ==
Custodio dedicated a large part of his life to teaching and researching Philosophy. He left a very important legacy in Guatemala as a professor, writer and Philosopher, since he considered Philosophy truly as an "adventure" of mankind, as he himself stated: "He who gets used to thinking philosophically does so with rigor, discipline and clarity about essential, fundamental and deeply human issues" and "Scrutinizing a philosophical problem consists of looking at the broadest horizon that can be presented to any human being who seeks to clarify, as much as possible, what, by nature, does not afflict nobody, but that moves, like a shadow, over every conscience that feels restless in philosophical questioning."

== Bibliography ==
- Montiel, Edgar; Blanco, Juan; Dávila, Amílcar; Fuentes Olivia, Regina, Repesarnos: Guatemala 2012, capital mundial de la filosofía, UNESCO, OCLC 750375980
- E, Amílcar Dávila (2017), Revista de Filosofia de la Universidad de Costa Rica, vol. 56, pp. 56 (144): 155–169, ISSN 0034-8252
