= Guatemalan National Natural History Museum =

Museum in Guatemala City, Guatemala

Museo de Historia Natural Jorge Ibarra
- Coordinates: 14.59707°N 90.52991°W

The Guatemalan National Natural History Museum (Spanish: Museo de Historia Natural 'Jorge A. Ibarra') is a national natural history museum in Guatemala City, Guatemala.

It was founded in 1950 and moved to its present facility in 1986. It was renamed in honor of its founder and long-term director, Jorge A. Ibarra.
