= Universidad Panamericana de Guatemala =

Guatemala City university

Coordinates: 14.6604°N 90.5591°W

Universidad Panamericana de Guatemala is a university in Zone 16 of Guatemala City.
