= Zipacná de León =

Guatemalan artist (1948–2002)

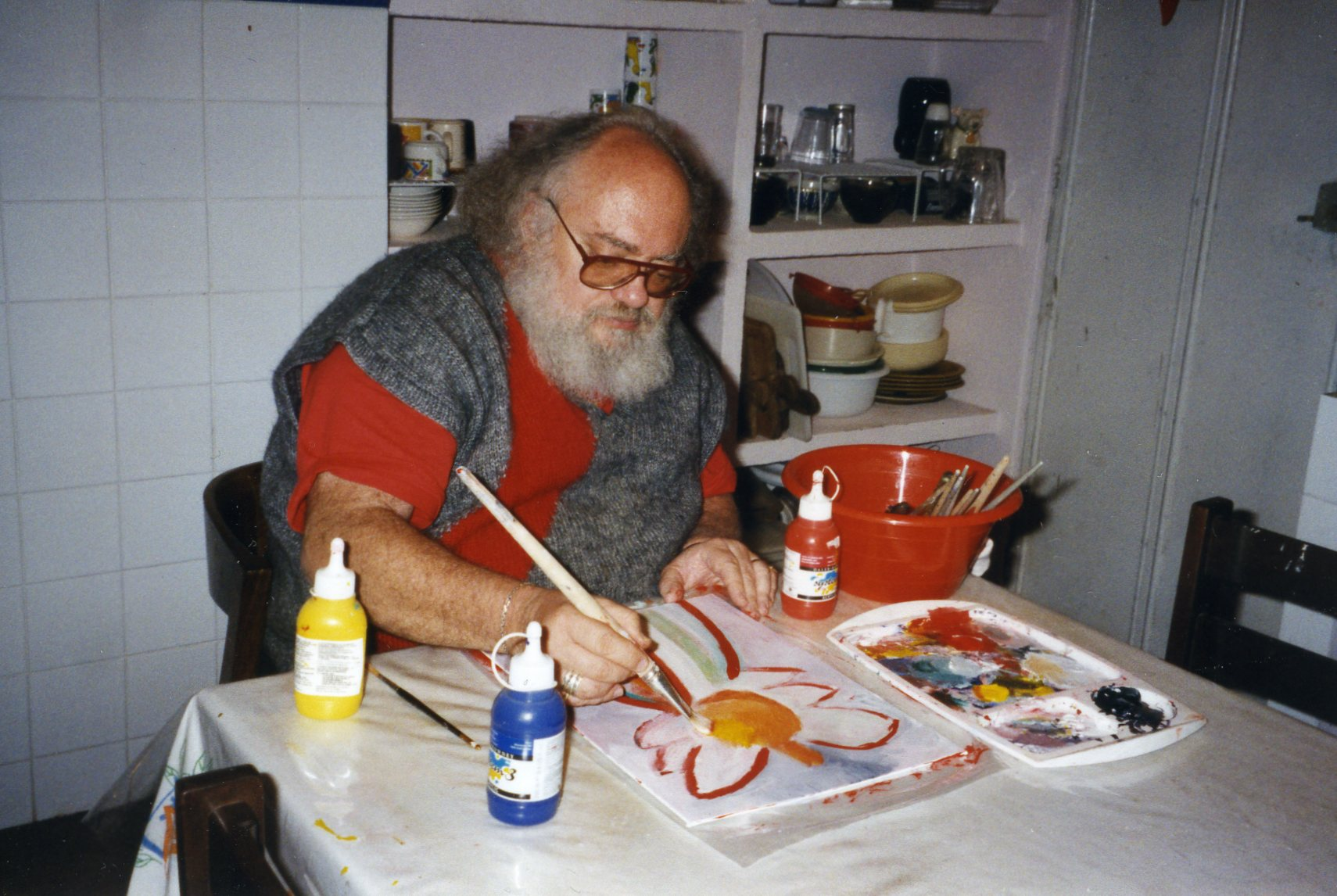
- Zipacná de León in 2000
- Born: Sergio Zipacná de León Rodríguez; 25 July 1948; Guatemala city, Guatemala
- Died: 21 January 2002 (aged 53); Guatemala city, Guatemala
- Known for: Painting, Drawing, Printmaking, Ceramics

Zipacná de León (1948–2002) was a Guatemalan painter. He was the son of sculptor Adalberto de León Soto.

== Education ==
Having started his primary studies in Paris ( France ), completed his academic studies in Guatemala . Although self-taught in painting, also conducted formal studies. He specialized in engraving Lola Cueto and Carlos Jurado in Mexico ( 1968 - 1971 ), and Carlos Colombino in the University of Costa Rica ( 1978 ). He studied Modern Art and Museology at the Centre Georges Pompidou (Paris, France) in 1979 .

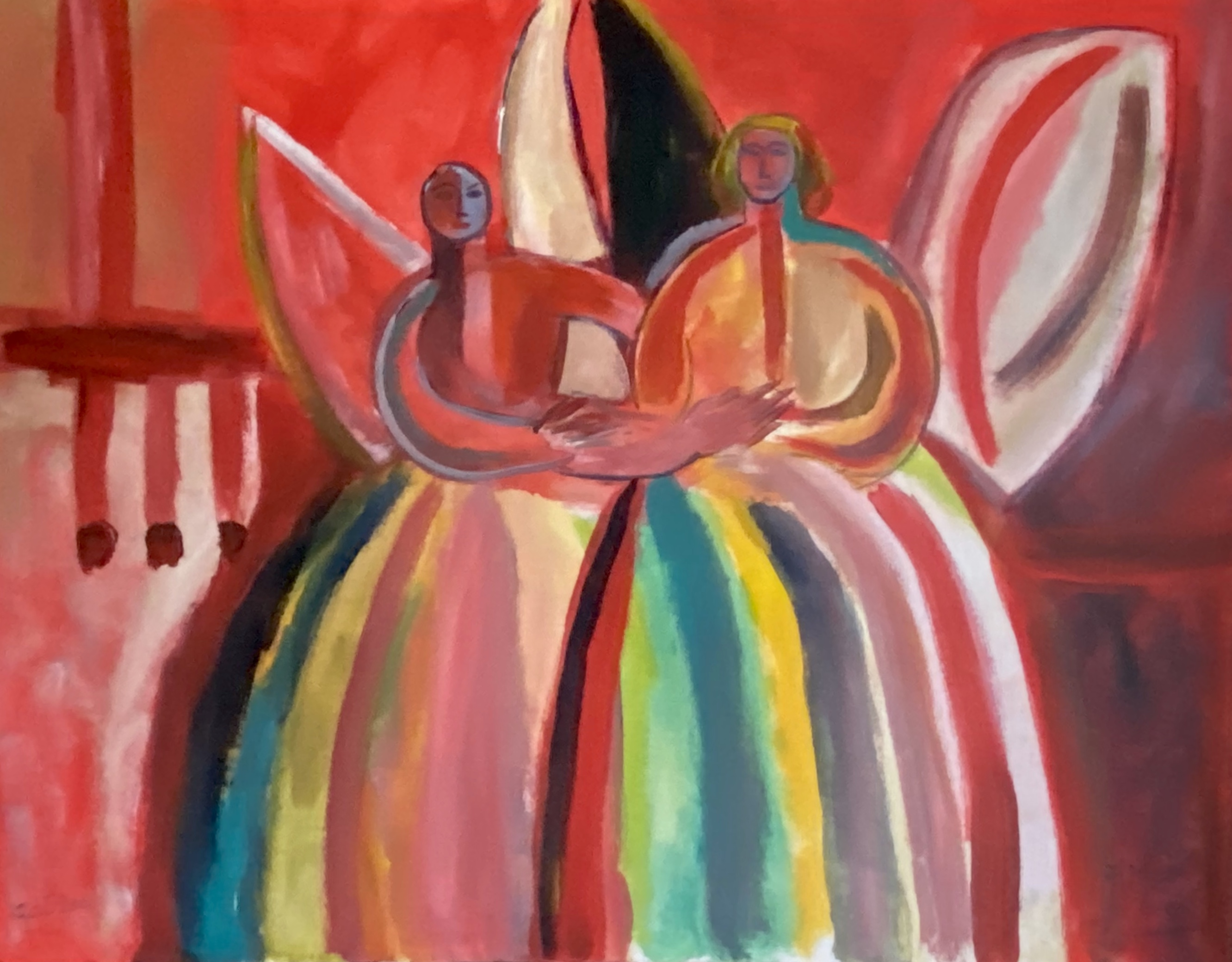
Two angels with linked arms, work of the Guatemalan artist Zipacná de León (1948 - 2002)

De Leon was born in Guatemala City to a family of long artistic tradition. He is recognized as a very important and influential figure in the cultural scene of Guatemala, a painter and ceramist, as well as a personality, investigator and patron of the arts. He initiated his elementary studies in Paris (France) and concluded his academic studies in Guatemala. Although self-taught in Painting he also made formal studies. He specialized in engraving with Lola Cueto and Carlos Jurado in Mexico (1968–1971), and with Carlos Colombino at the University of Costa Rica (1978). He studied Modern Art and Museography at the Georges Pompidou Centre (Paris, France) in 1979.

He was the co-founder of several cultural institutions in Guatemala and he stands out for coordinating the Permanent Program of Art Paiz(1978–1989) and at the Regional Schools of Art (1989) (Ministry of Culture and Sport of Guatemala). In addition, he was university professor of the Escuela Nacional de Artes Plásticas "Rafael Rodríguez Padilla" (National School of Arts “Rafael Rodriguez Padilla”) (1977–1996). In September 2000 he was also granted the title of Distinguished Citizen of the City of Quetzaltenango.

He had numerous one man shows and multiple group shows in Guatemala and abroad. He has published several papers on Guatemalan Art and several presentations of national and foreign artists He was a relentless traveler. During his multiple trips he researched the art and the culture around the world (Egypt, Taiwan, Greece, Switzerland, Costa Rica, etc.), which continuously enriched his vision of the arts and its function in modern society.
