= La Aurora Zoo =

Parque Zoológico La Aurora
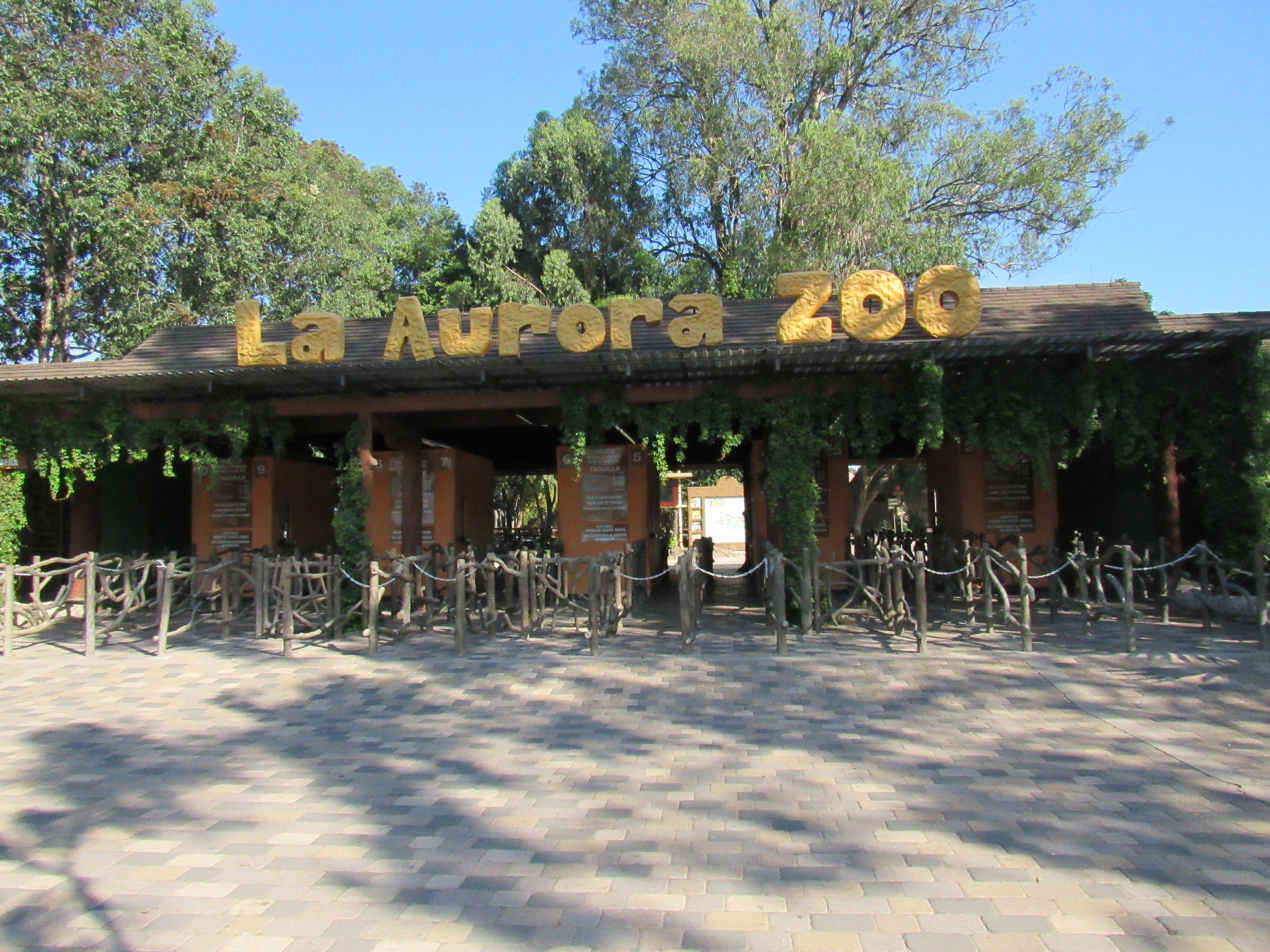
- Interactive map of Parque Zoológico La Aurora
- 14.6000085°N 90.5266572°W
- Date opened: 1924
- Location: Guatemala City, Guatemala
- Website: www.aurorazoo.org.gt

The Parque Zoológico La Aurora is a zoological park in Guatemala City, Guatemala. It is one of the largest urban green spaces in the city. The zoo has three different areas, where animals from Asia, the Americas, and Africa can be observed. The zoo was founded in 1924 in the southern part of the city as part of a huge entertainment area then called Parque Reforma, featuring several museums, parks and a hippodrome. Later, with the conversion of a small airfield into La Aurora International Airport the park was greatly diminished in size. The remains of an ancient viaduct can be found in the park's vicinity. In 2007, the hippodrome was demolished due to a further expansion of the airport.
