= Lorena Cabnal =

Guatemalan activist

- Born: 1973 (age 52–53); Guatemala
- Occupation: Activist

Lorena Cabnal (Guatemala, 1973) is co-founder of the community-territorial feminist movement in Guatemala and of the Red de Sanadoras Ancestrales del Feminismo Comunitario (Network of Ancestral Healers of Community Feminism).

== Biography ==
Lorena grew up on the outskirts of the Guatemalan capital during the Guatemalan Civil War. Her family had to flee their Q'eqchí Maya territory in Alta Verapaz after being expelled by landowners, as did thousands of indigenous people who were forcibly displaced during the military government of Efráin Ríos Montt.

She grew up in a context of violence that she considered part of everyday life. After talking to a friend about her father's sexual abuse against her, Lorena stopped naturalizing violence and ran away from home at the age of 15.

The activist wanted to study medicine, but her economic situation did not allow it. However, thanks to her mother, who was a herbalist and who also worked as a cook in private homes, giving her the opportunity to have contacts and allowing her daughter to study transfusion medicine. There she met important women for her path: the doctor Gladys Murga, who was her mentor in the medical field and the philosopher María Rosa Padilla, who marked her life because with her she began to listen to other academic interpretations from a social and anthropological perspective of the indigenous villages.

And at the age of 25, she decided to move away from her community and arrived in the mountains in Santa María Xalapán, Guatemala, where she began to work against sexual violence and where she also met Victoria Serrano, who would be one of her spiritual grandmothers until her death.

My intention was to talk to the girls and boys, because I wanted to contribute so that there was no more sexual violence against them based on my story.

== Activism ==
Lorena, in addition to being a feminist, is a healer and daughter of Xinca Mayan cosmology, and together with her mountain companions, she began her activism defending the territory, fighting against transgenics, free trade agreements, against the dispossessions of landowners in the ancestral territory and then against mining, and it was the sexist actions of her daily life, such as that the government of her community was made up of 357 men and no women and that there were only male spiritual guides, which prompted her to question life within her community and together with a group of women who shared the same concerns gave way to territorial community feminism.

As soon as she became a feminist, she began to suffer violence from her fellow men in the community, who accused her of having been contaminated by foreign white feminists, stigmatized her and forced her to leave the community despite her active role in the defense of Xinka territory against numerous mining projects. They even demanded that she get pregnant again.

Children are life and the guarantee of existentia of our peoples. And a daughter is nothing. If you want to work with women again, you have to get pregnant again.

After refusing to accept what she calls indigenous fundamentalisms, or the unchangeable original patriarchal customs, she decided to leave the community together with her daughter. However, she has no regrets as she has no intention of remaining silent again against misogyny, sexual violence and femicide.

In this sense, her militancy has cost her more than a decade of years, being accompanied by Peace Brigades International, an organization that protects human rights defenders.

== Territorial community feminism ==
Lorena does not call herself a decolonial feminist, but a territorial community feminist, since she considers that the bodies-territories suffer pressure and violence both in the present and in ancestral memories and invites healing to continue fighting for the defense of the territories-body-land.

For the healer, the body is a primordial factor because she considers that colonization, invasion, looting, genocide, the dispossession of both territories and ancestral knowledge, racism have been built on it and, therefore, it is in a constant threat, then it becomes a disputed territory. For her, it is necessary to fight against this violence at the same time that one fights to defend the land. In the last decade, community feminism has spread to countries like Bolivia and Guatemala. From where, she and her companions launched the proposal for the Recuperación y Defensa del Territorio Cuerpo-Tierra (Recovery and Defense of the Body-Earth Territory), which tries to make visible the need to weave the struggles against extractivist projects with the eradication of the violence exerted by men against the bodies of women in the same communities in resistance.

In the network of healers, there are ancestral midwives, timekeepers, healers, herbalists and they all work as a team, all contribute from their processes and knowledge. They are based on calendrical sources and are guided according to the Mayan calendar to carry out any process, which is always accompanied, but insists that there are a diversity of healing paths. In addition, from the community and territorial feminist network they carry out decoding work that allows them to claim feminist theoretical concepts from the words and feelings of each one and their contexts.

For the Guatemalan feminist, healing is a cosmic-political path. Cosmic because of the ancestral memory and the link with nature, and political because one heals to be well, but also to continue fighting.

== List of works ==
- Acercamiento a la construcción del pensamiento epistémico de las mujeres indígenas feministas comunitarias de Abya Yala (2010).
- De las opresiones a las emancipaciones: Mujeres indígenas en defensa del territorio cuerpo-tierra (2016).
- En tiempos de muerte: cuerpos, rebeldías, resistencias (2019).
