= Ronald MacKay =

Guatemalan Internet personality (born 1975)

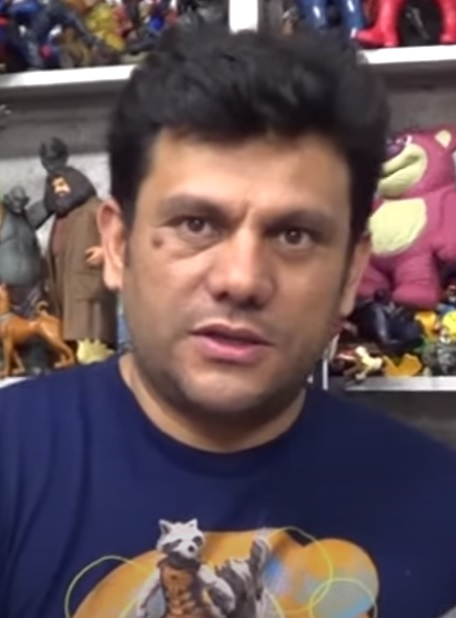
- MacKay in February 2015
- Born: Ronald Alejandro Ramírez MacKay; January 14, 1975 (age 51); Guatemala
- Education: Architecture and graphic design
- Occupations: YouTuber; Voice actor; Broadcaster
- Years active: 2006–present

Ronald Alejandro Ramírez MacKay (born 14 January 1975), known professionally as Ronald MacKay, is a Guatemalan YouTuber, voice actor and broadcaster. He is known for producing comedy dubbing videos, parodies and commentary on films, politics and video games. He has also worked in radio and television and performed Spanish-language dubbing for several characters in the animated film The Emoji Movie (2017).

== Career ==
=== Online video ===
MacKay began producing online comedy videos in 2006, creating dubbed versions of scenes from films with humorous dialogue. In a 2024 interview with Soy502, he recalled that he started making the videos as a way to entertain himself and a friend while spending time at his toy business. He subsequently developed several content projects under the name Al Buen Chapín.

MacKay created his YouTube account in October 2012. His videos have included parodies of films, political commentary and video game-related content.

Over time, he developed several online content projects, including Doblajes Al Buen Chapín, Choco Reacciones, Choco Plays and Las Búsquedas.

=== Voice acting ===
In July 2017, MacKay was selected to provide Spanish-language voices for five characters in the animated film The Emoji Movie, produced by Sony Pictures Animation. The characters included Eggplant, Nerd Emoji, Nervous Emoji, Alien and a Trojan Soldier. He obtained the roles after auditioning for the production.

MacKay has also discussed his experience in voice dubbing and the development of his online comedy work in interviews with Guatemalan media outlets.

=== Media appearances ===
MacKay has appeared in radio and television programmes in Guatemala. In 2017, he received media attention following online attacks directed at him and comments about his work on social media.

In October 2023, he was invited to speak at a cultural discussion organised by Centro Universitario Ciudad Vieja. The event covered his personal history, social media projects and interest in collecting miniatures, including those related to the Star Wars franchise.

In May 2024, MacKay discussed his online career, toy collecting and the development of Los Tres Rucones, a programme he worked on with Goyo de León and Julio Cruz.

== Filmography ==
Voice roles
Year	Film	Role	Notes
2017	The Emoji Movie	Eggplant, Nerd Emoji, Nervous Emoji, Alien and Trojan Soldier	Spanish-language dubbing
