= List of sinkholes =

Links to Wikipedia articles on sinkholes, blue holes, dolines, cenotes, and pit caves

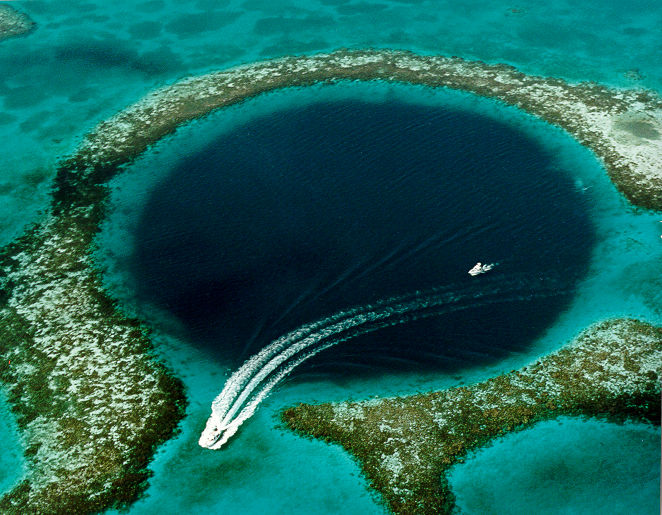
The Great Blue Hole, a giant submarine sinkhole, near Ambergris Caye, Belize

The following is a list of sinkholes, blue holes, dolines, crown holes, cenotes, and pit caves. A sinkhole is a depression or hole in the ground caused by some form of collapse of the surface layer. Some are caused by karst processes—for example, the chemical dissolution of carbonate rocks or suffosion processes. Sinkholes can vary in size from 1 to 600 m (3 to 2,000 ft) both in diameter and depth, and vary in form from soil-lined bowls to bedrock-edged chasms. Sinkholes may form gradually or suddenly, and are found worldwide.

== Australia ==
- Ewens Ponds – series of three water-filled limestone sinkholes on Eight Mile Creek 25 kilometres (16 mi) south of Mount Gambier and 8.4 km (5 1/4 mi) east of Port MacDonnell, South Australia.
- Fossil Cave – The cave is a karst sinkhole and is largely filled with water.
- Kilsby sinkhole – in Mount Gambier, Southern Australia.
- Koonalda Cave – a cave located in the Nullarbor Plain in South Australia.
- Little Blue Lake – water-filled doline located near Mount Schank in South Australia.
- Numby Numby – a sinkhole located 25 to 30 kilometres (16 to 19 mi) west-northwest of Borroloola in the Northern Territory.
- Piccaninnie Ponds Conservation Park

== Brazil ==
- Buraco das Araras – one of the largest quartzitic caves located in Goiás. Considered one of the largest sinkholes (dolinas) in the world
- Gruta do Centenário – a cave located in Mariana, Minas Gerais, the largest and deepest quartzite cave in the world, and second in the country in terms of unevenness

== Canada ==
- 2012 Ottawa sinkhole – Regional Road 174 at the Jeanne D'Arc interchange on September 4, 2012.
- 2014 Ottawa sinkhole – at the LRT tunnelling site at Waller Street, just south of Laurier Avenue on February 21, 2014.
- 2016 Ottawa sinkhole – Rideau Street was closed to all traffic from June 8 to July 2, 2016 after it collapsed above excavations being made for the Rideau station of the Confederation Line.

== China ==
- Dragon Hole – the second deepest underwater sinkhole (blue hole), located in the Drummond Island reef of the Paracel Islands (also known as the Xisha Islands) in the South China Sea. (Note: Claimed by the People's Republic of China, the Republic of China (Taiwan), and Vietnam.)
- Xiaozhai Tiankeng – one of the deepest sinkholes in the world (over 650 meters), located in Fengjie County of Chongqing Municipality.
- 2016 Ruijin sinkhole – four cars fell into a sinkhole in Ruijin.

== Croatia ==
- Blue Lake – a karst lake located near Imotski
- Red Lake – a sinkhole containing a karst lake near Imotski

== Czech Republic ==
- Hranice Abyss – the deepest abyss in the Czech Republic, located near Hranice
- Macocha Gorge – a sinkhole in the Moravian Karst cave system
- Punkva Caves – a cave system north of Brno, near Blansko

== France ==
- Padirac Cave - very deep pit cave in Massif Central, with subterranean river

== Germany ==
- Bullenkuhle – marshy lake in the extreme north of Gifhorn district in Lower Saxony which has been formed into a sinkhole
- Danube Sinkhole – incipient underground stream capture in the Upper Danube Nature Park

== Greece ==
- Dersios sinkhole – a sinkhole in Arcadia
- Voulismeno aloni – Crete

== Guatemala ==
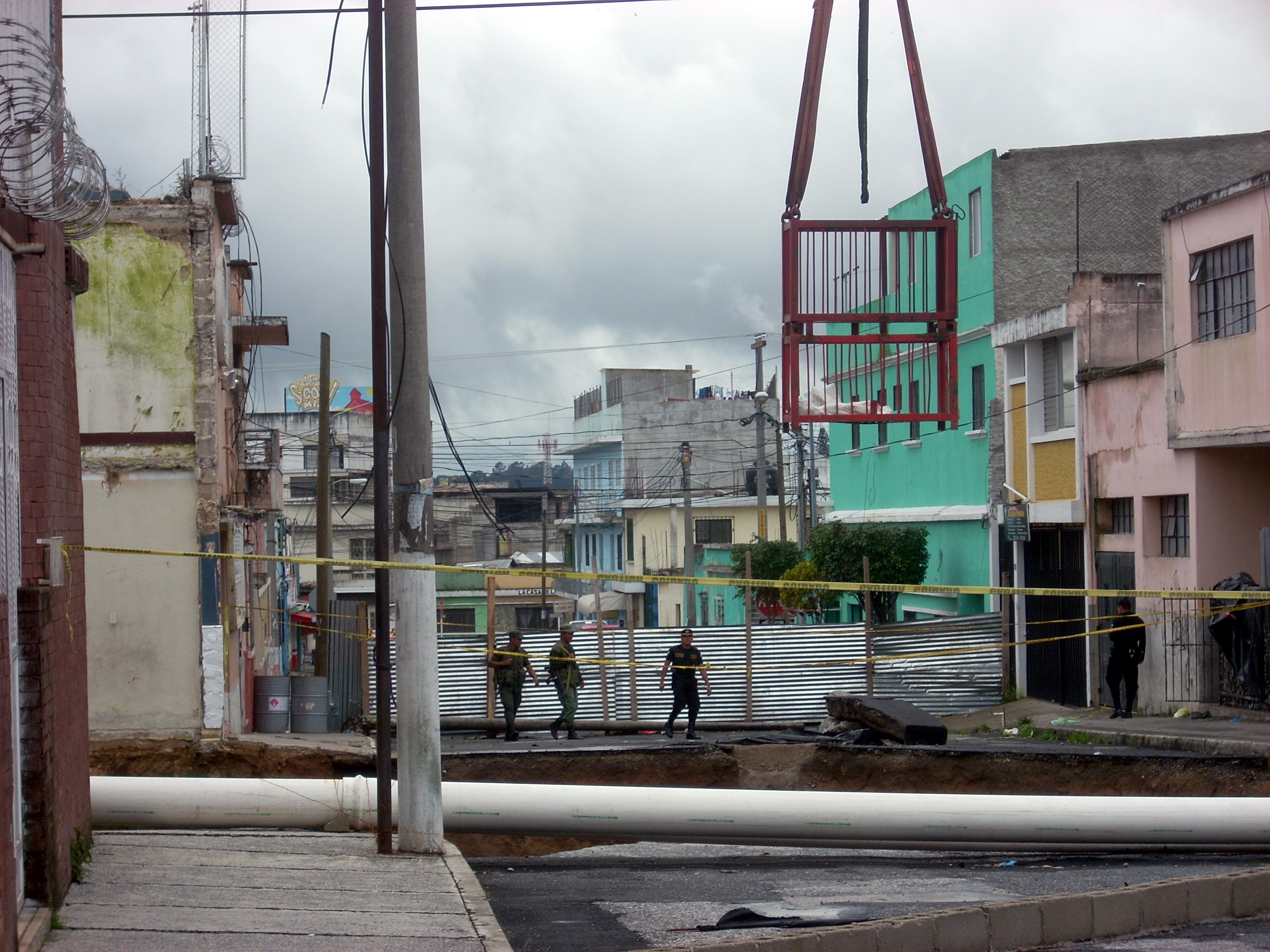
The 2010 Guatemala City sinkhole

- 2007 Guatemala City sinkhole – a 100 m (330 ft) deep sinkhole which formed in 2007 due to sewage pipe ruptures.
- 2010 Guatemala City sinkhole – a disaster in which an area approximately 20 m (65 ft) across and 90 m (300 ft) deep collapsed, swallowing a three-story factory.

== Italy ==
- Gurio Lamanna – a flat, wide and shallow karst doline shaped like a coat of arms and very close to Pulicchio di Gravina and Tre Paduli.
- Lago di Doberdò – a sinkhole in the Province of Gorizia, Friuli-Venezia Giulia
- Pozzo del Merro – a flooded sinkhole in the countryside northeast of Rome
- Pulo di Altamura – a karst doline near Altamura containing some caves, where Saint William of Montevergine (1085-1142) reportedly lived as a hermit.
- Pulo di Molfetta
- Pulicchio di Gravina – an egg-shaped forested karst doline located in Gravina in Puglia and very close to Gurio Lamanna and Tre Paduli.
- 2016 Florence sinkhole – a sinkhole, thought to have been caused by a bursting of a water pipe, opened up a 200 m (660 ft) hole on the Arno River bank.

== Malaysia ==
- 2024 Kuala Lumpur sinkhole, which swallowed a person who has not yet been found

== Mexico ==
- Cave of Swallows – an open air pit cave in Aquismón, San Luis Potosí
- Dzibilchaltun – a Maya archaeological site in Yucatán State, approximately 16 kilometers (10 miles) north of Mérida
- Ik Kil – a cenote outside Pisté in the Tinúm Municipality, Yucatán
- Sacred Cenote – a cenote at the pre-Columbian Maya archaeological site of Chichen Itza in the northern Yucatán Peninsula
- Sima de las Cotorras – a giant circular sinkhole in the karst plateau of Chiapas
- Sistema Dos Ojos – a flooded cave system located north of Tulum, on the Caribbean coast of the Yucatán Peninsula, in Quintana Roo
- Sistema Sac Actun – an underwater cave system situated along the Caribbean coast of the Yucatán Peninsula with passages to the north and west of Tulum, Quintana Roo
- Zacatón – a thermal water filled sinkhole belonging to the Zacatón system – a group of unusual karst features located in Aldama Municipality, Tamaulipas near the Sierra de Tamaulipas
- Taam Ja' Blue Hole - the deepest known blue hole

== Namibia ==
- Lake Guinas – a sinkhole lake, created by a collapsing karst cave, located 38 km (23 1/2 mi) west of Tsumeb
- Otjikoto Lake – a sinkhole lake that was created by a collapsing karst cave

== South Africa ==
- Blyvooruitzicht sinkholes
- Boesmansgat – believed to be the sixth-deepest submerged freshwater cave (or sinkhole) in the world

== Turkey ==
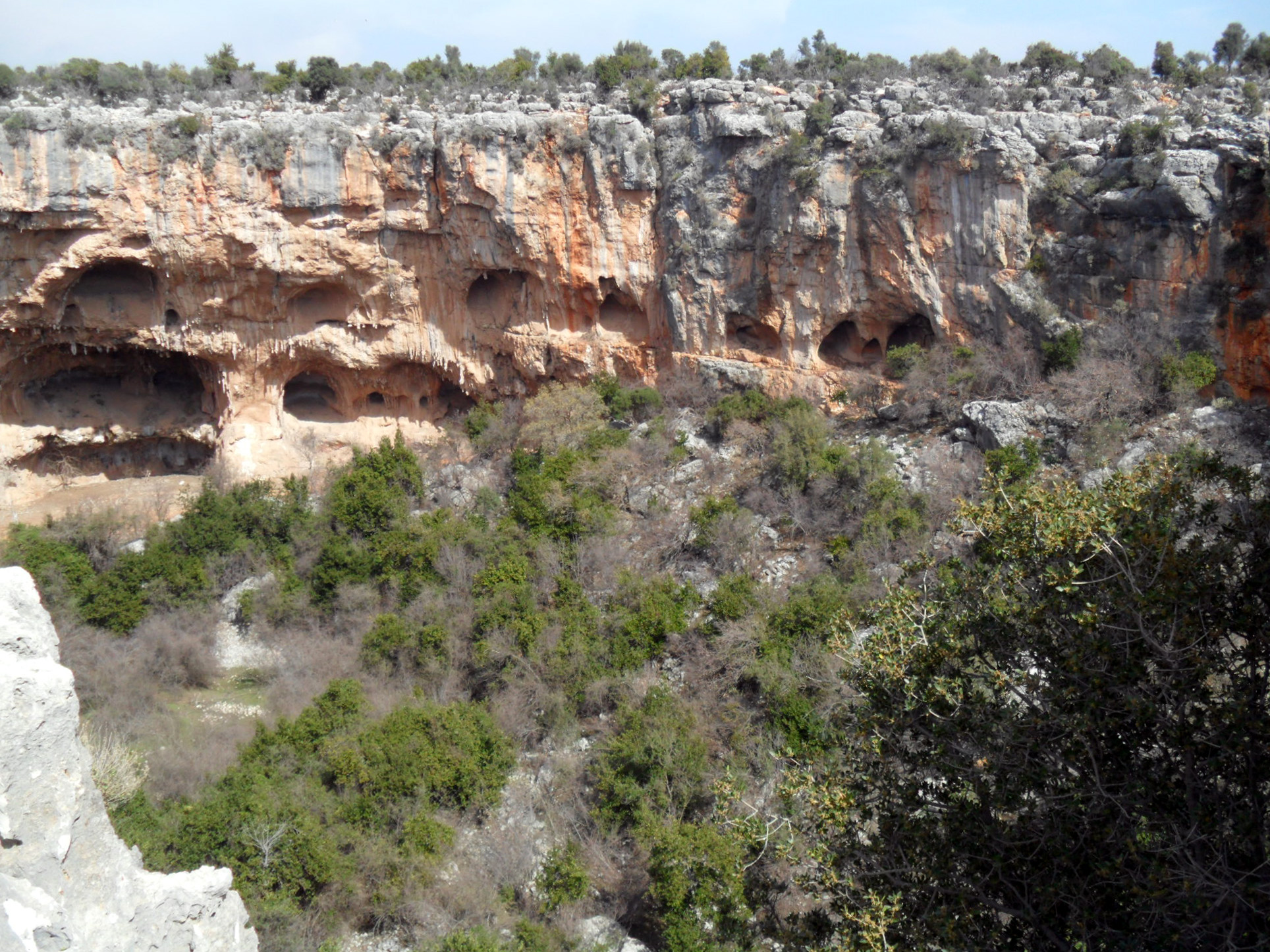
A view of the Akhayat sinkhole

- Akhayat sinkhole – sinkhole in Mersin Province
- Cennet and Cehennem – two large sinkholes in the Taurus Mountains, in Mersin Province
- Egma Sinkhole – sinkhole and the deepest cave in Turkey
- Kanlıdivane – ancient city situated around a big sinkhole in Mersin Province
- Kızören Sinkhole – sinkhole in Konya Province

== United States ==
- 2014 National Corvette Museum sinkhole – a sinkhole at 350 Corvette Drive, Bowling Green, Kentucky
- Amberjack Hole – a blue hole located 48 km (30 mi) off the coast of Sarasota, Florida.
- Bayou Corne sinkhole – created from a collapsed underground salt dome cavern operated by Texas Brine Company and owned by Occidental Petroleum, discovered on August 3, 2012, and 350 nearby residents were advised to evacuate
- Bering Sinkhole – natural limestone sinkhole in Texas used for prehistoric burials
- Big Basin Prairie Preserve – St. Jacob's Well, Kansas, a water-filled sinkhole which lies in the Little Basin, and the Big Basin, a 1.5-kilometre-wide (1 mi) crater-like depression
- Blue Hole (Castalia) – a fresh water pond located in Castalia, Erie County, Ohio
- Blue Hole (New Mexico) – circular, bell-shaped pool east of Santa Rosa, New Mexico
- Bottomless Lakes State Park – Lazy Lagoon Lake, New Mexico, made up of three separate sinkholes
- Cedar Sink – a vertical-walled large depression in Kentucky.
- Daisetta, Texas – sits on a salt dome, in 1969, 1981, 2008 and again in 2023, sinkholes formed in the area
- Deep Lake (Florida) – a natural sinkhole in Big Cypress National Preserve in Florida
- Deep Run Ponds Natural Area Preserve – contains one of the largest remaining systems of the Shenandoah Valley sinkhole ponds in Virginia
- Devil's Den Cave – a karst window over an underground river near Williston, Florida
- Devil's Kitchen Sinkhole - located in Coconino National Forest, Arizona
- Devil's Millhopper Geological State Park – located in Gainesville, Florida
- Devil's Sinkhole State Natural Area – a natural bat habitat near Rocksprings in Edwards County, Texas
- Grassy Cove – an enclosed valley in Cumberland County, Tennessee notable for its karst formations
- Green Banana Hole – a blue hole located 80 km (50 mi) off the coast of Sarasota, Florida.
- Kingsley Lake – a lake is thought to have formed as a sinkhole about 10 km (6 mi) east of Starke, Florida
- Lake Eola Park – Lake Eola is a sinkhole located in downtown Orlando, Florida
- Lake Peigneur – was originally a shallow freshwater body in Louisiana, until a man-made disaster on November 20, 1980 changed its structure, affecting the surrounding land and making it a brackish water lake
- Little Salt Spring – a feature of the karst topography of Florida
- Makauwahi Cave – the largest limestone cave found in Kauai, Hawaii
- Marvel Cave – a National Natural Landmark west of Branson, Missouri, on top of Roark Mountain in Stone County
- Montezuma Well – a natural limestone sinkhole near Rimrock, Arizona
- Mount Joy Pond Natural Area Preserve – a large sinkhole pond located in Augusta County, Virginia
- NR-1 Sinkhole – an underwater sinkhole first located by the NR-1 submarine; located southwest of Key West, Florida
- Peter Sinks – a natural sinkhole in northern Utah, one of the coldest places in the contiguous United States
- Pipe Creek Sinkhole – near Swayzee in Grant County, Indiana, important paleontological site
- The Inkpot – 27 meter sinkhole located at the Salt Creek Wilderness Area north of Roswell, New Mexico
- Trout Pond – a sinkhole that filled with water near Wardensville in Hardy County, West Virginia

== Venezuela ==
- Sima Humboldt
- Sima Martel
- Haitón del Guarataro

== Other locations ==
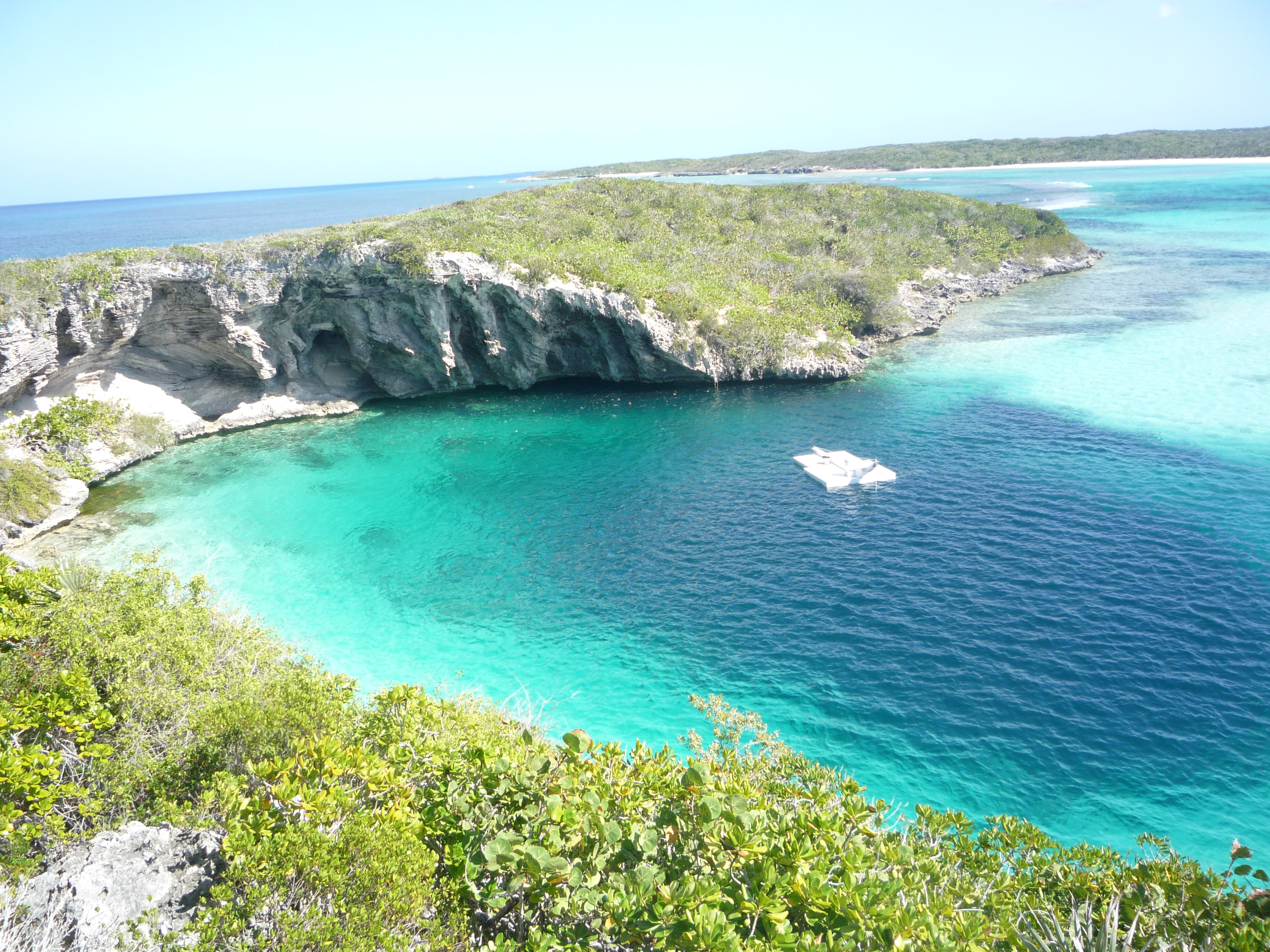
Dean's Blue Hole is the world's second deepest known salt water blue hole with an entrance below the sea level.

- Biržai Regional Park – a park in northern Lithuania established in 1992 to preserve a distinctive karst landscape
- Blue Hole (Red Sea) – a submarine sinkhole around 94 m (308 feet) deep in east Sinai, a few kilometres north of Dahab, Egypt on the coast of the Red Sea.
- Dead Sea sinkholes
- Dean's Blue Hole – the world's second deepest known salt water blue hole with an entrance below the sea level; in the Bahamas
- Devil's Hole, Bermuda – a large water-filled sinkhole, close to the southeastern corner of Harrington Sound
- Great Blue Hole – a giant submarine sinkhole off the coast of Belize
- Harwoods Hole – cave system located in the northwest of the South Island of New Zealand, New Zealand's deepest vertical shaft
- Hutchinson's Hole – a large sinkhole in Saint Ann Parish in northern Jamaica, used by a serial killer to dispose of bodies
- Playa de Gulpiyuri – a flooded sinkhole with an inland beach located near Llanes, Spain
- 2018 Surabaya City sinkhole – a 30 m (98 ft) wide and 15 m (49 ft) deep sinkhole opened up on Gubeng Road in Surabaya, Indonesia during construction work on December 18, 2018.
- 2022 Tierra Amarilla sinkhole – a 25 m (80 ft) wide and more than 200 m (660 ft) deep sinkhole appeared in the commune of Tierra Amarilla, Atacama Region of Chile close to the Alcaparrosa copper mine on August 1, 2022. The sinkhole continued to grow and stretched 50 m (160 ft) in diameter on August 8.

== See also ==
- Karst
- List of deepest caves
