= Devil's Kitchen =

Devil's Kitchen may refer to:

India

- A cave in India, part of the Guna caves system. Responsible for the death of at least 16 people who fell into it.

The United Kingdom:

- The English name for 'Twll Du' on the Y Garn (Glyderau), a mountain in Snowdonia, northern Wales, UK

The United States:

- Devil's Kitchen, a "mini-Bryce Canyon National Park" on the Nebo Loop Scenic Byway in the Uinta National Forest in central Utah, USA
- Devil's Kitchen, one of the geothermal areas in Lassen Volcanic National Park, California, USA
- Devil's Kitchen (cave), a cave in Mackinac Island, Michigan, USA
- Devils Kitchen Lake, a lake in southern Illinois, USA
- Devil's Kitchen, Gettysburg, a rock formation on Big Round Top at Gettysburg, Pennsylvania
- Devil's Kitchen, a gully that forms part of the Platte Clove valley in the Catskill Mountains, New York, USA
- Devil's Kitchen Sinkhole, a sinkhole along the Jordon Trail, Sedona, Arizona
- Mt. Helena City Park, a cave in Helena, Montana.
