= Akhayat sinkhole =

Sinkhole in Mersin Province, Turkey

Coordinates: 36.4482°N 34.0103°E

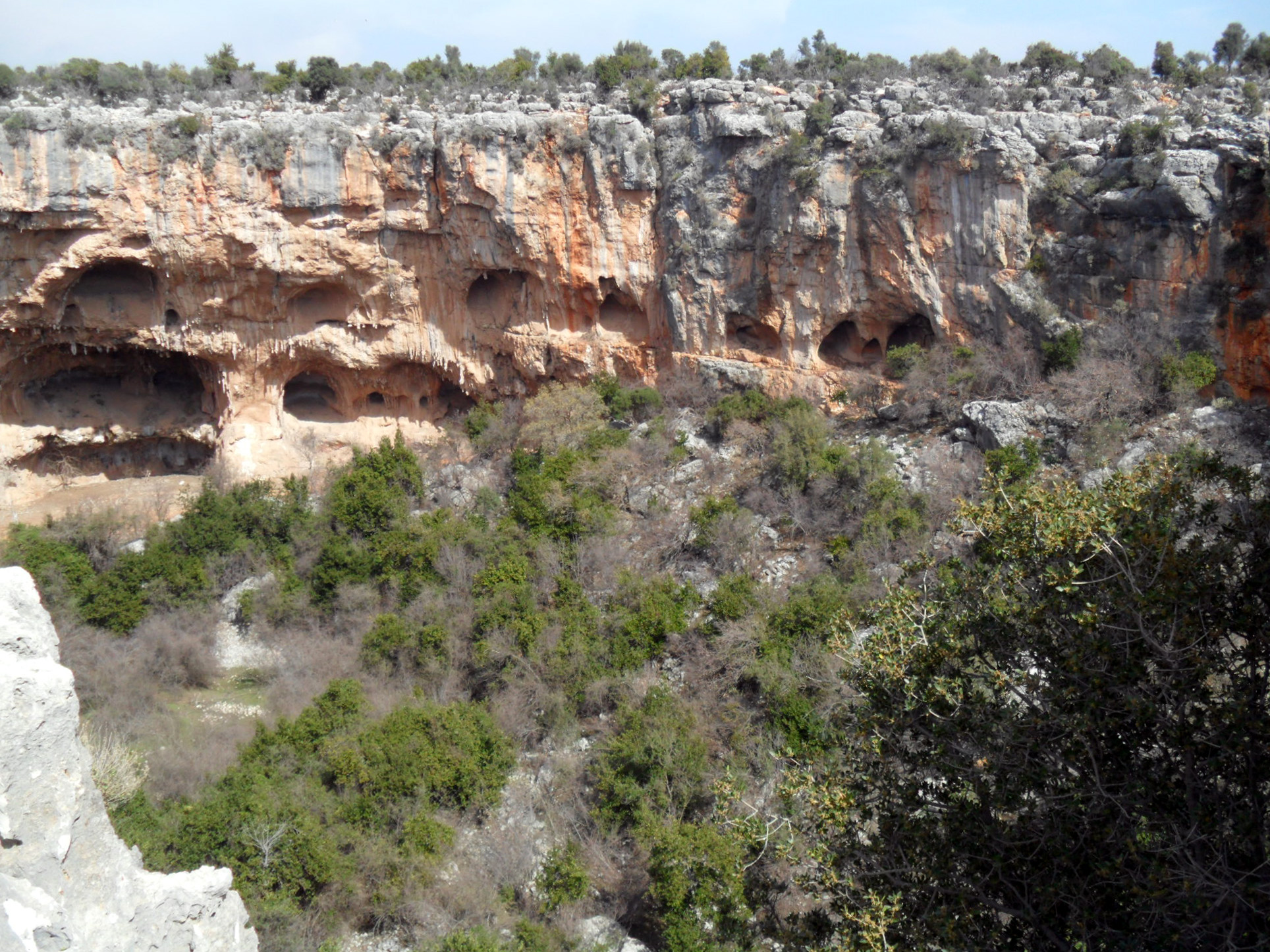
A view of the Akhayat sinkhole

Akhayat (also known as Aşağı Dünya Obruğu) is a sinkhole in Mersin Province, Turkey.

The Akhayat Sinkhole is located in a rural area of the Silifke ilçe (district), to the north of Atayurt town.

== Geography ==
The sinkhole is situated to the north of Atayurt town in the rural area of Silifke district. Its distance to Silifke is 19 kilometres (12 mi) Visitors from Mersin follow Turkish state highway D.400 for 75 kilometres (47 mi) and the road to north for 10 kilometres (6.2 mi) and finally a path for 700 metres (2,300 ft).

== The sinkhole ==
Its dimensions are about 100 x 150 m^{2} ( 330 x 490 ft^{2}) Its maximum depth with respect to surrounding is 70 metres (230 ft). There is a rock carved ancient ladder on the north west side. But a part of the ladder has been demolished and descending by using the ladder is dangerous. There are several man made caves on the walls of the sinkhole. 400 metres (1,300 ft) west of the sinkhole there are traces of an ancient settlement which was probably a cult center. It is thought that the sinkhole and the settlement were probably related to each other. There are rock tombs and altars to the south of the sinkhole

== Tourism ==
There are other sinkholes in Mersin Province such as Cennet and Cehennem system and Kanlıdivane. Akhayat is relatively less known. Although it is possible to visit the site presently there is no touristic activity. But Silifke governor said that the site will be opened to tourism.

== See also ==
- List of sinkholes of Turkey
