= Narlıkuyu Museum =

Mosaic Museum in Narlıkuyu, Turkey

- Narlıkuyu Müzesi
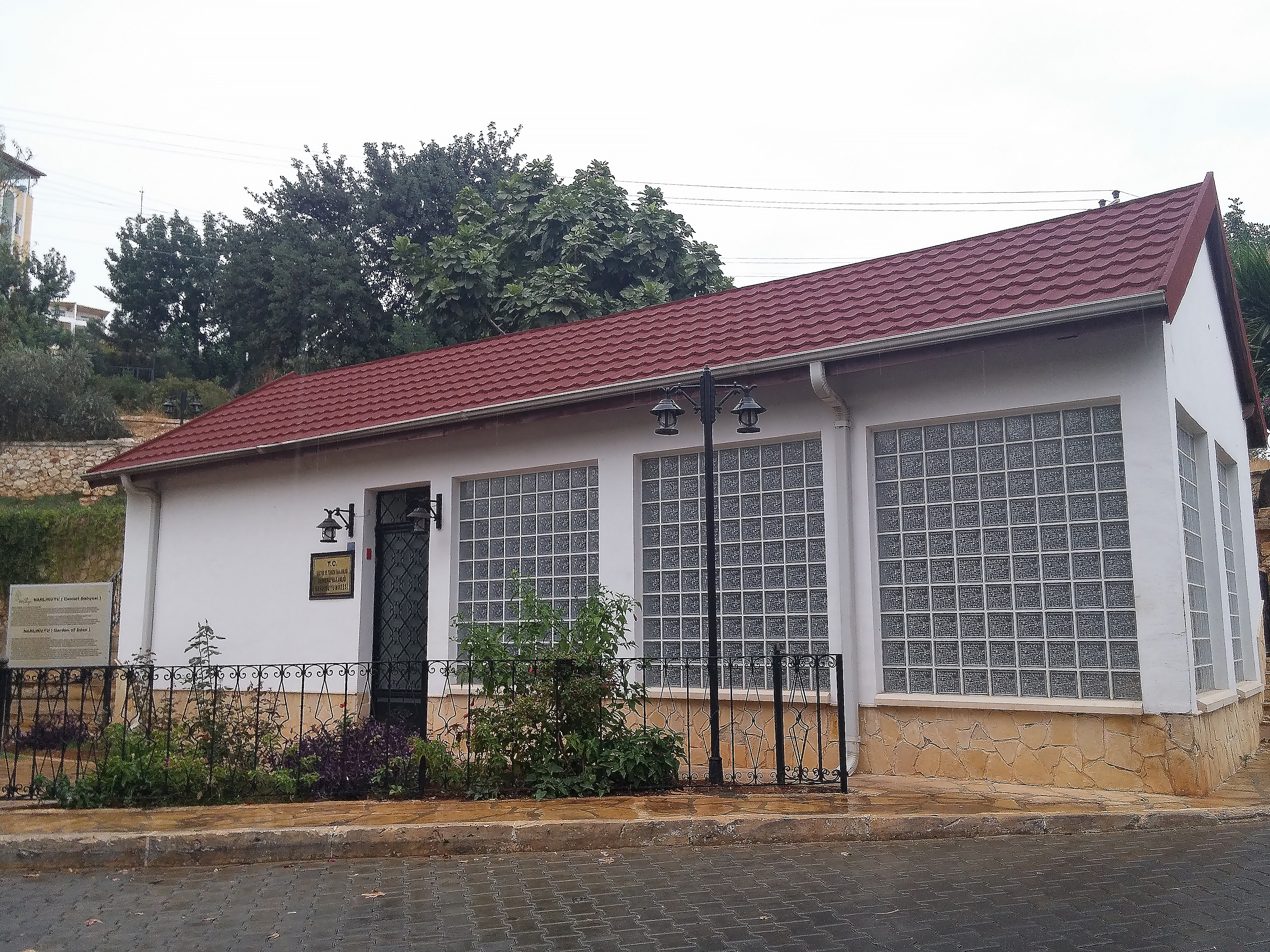
- Museum building

- Narlıkuyu Museum
- Established: 1976; 50 years ago
- Coordinates: 36°26′38″N 34°06′49″E
- Type: Mosaic
- Owner: Ministry of Culture

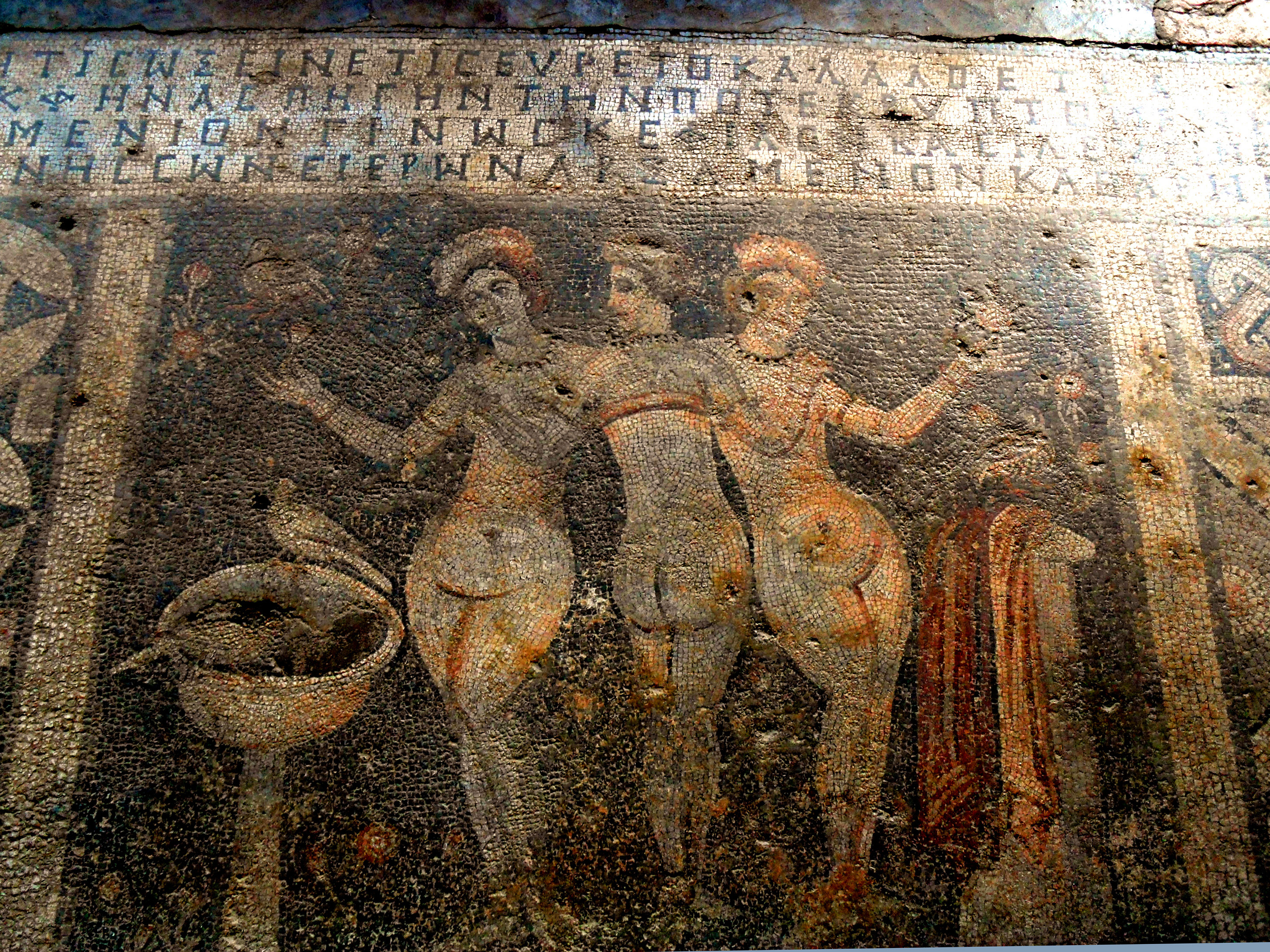
The mosaic in Narlıkuyu Museum

Narlıkuyu Mosaic Museum is a small museum in Narlıkuyu, Turkey that encompasses a Roman bath with mosaic tile floor. The mosaic depicts the Three Graces.

== Location ==
Narlıkuyu is a town in Silifke ilçe (district) of Mersin Province. Narlıkuyu is 20 kilometres (12 mi) from Silifke and 65 kilometres (40 mi) from Mersin. It is situated in a small Mediterranean bay which is fed by freshwater. The museum is actually a closed area of mosaic and it is situated just at the back of the restaurants at 36°26′38″N 34°06′49″E.

== History ==
During the Roman Empire, Narlıkuyu was called Porto Calamie. In the 4th century A.D., Poimenios, the Roman governor of nearby Corycus, (modern Kızkalesi) commissioned a bath and baptism complex in Porto Calamie. The source of the bath water was an underground stream from the sinkhole Cennet, which is in the Taurus Mountains, 1.1 kilometres (0.68 mi) northwest of Porto Calamie. The bath survives and, in 1976, a 65.28 m^{2} (702.7 sq ft) building was constructed to house the bath. The building is now under the supervision of the Ministry of Culture as a free-of-charge museum.

== The mosaic ==
An inscription at the entrance of the bath reads:

Dear Visitor, if you wonder who has discovered the origin of this miraculous water, know that he is Poimenios, the friend of the emperors and the honest administrator of the holy islands.

— unknown,

The emperors mentioned were probably Arcadius (378-408) and Honorius (384-423). The holy islands are the Princes' Islands of Marmara.

The bath floor is a mosaic. The mosaic depicts three Graces, Aglaea, Euphrosyne and Thalia, and a couple of partridges and doves. The local name of the mosaic is Üç Güzeller (English: Three beauties) The mosaic refers to the mythological story of the baptism of Aphrodite.
