= Inkwell (disambiguation) =

An inkwell is a small jar or container that is used for holding ink

Inkwell can also refer to:

- Inkwell (Lake Landing, North Carolina), on the US National Register of Historic Places
- Inkwell (Macintosh), handwriting recognition technology built into Mac OS X
- Inkwell (band), an alternative rock band
- Inkwell (journal), a literary journal at Manhattanville College
- Ink Well, the name of a section of Santa Monica State Beach
- The Inkwell, a 1994 film
- The Inkwell, a beach on Martha's Vineyard.
- The Inkwell (album) by Sean Garrett
- Inkwell Studios, the original name for Fleischer Studios
- Inkwell Awards, also known as the Inkwells, for American comic book inkers
- Inkwell, a character in the 2013 comic issue Princess Celestia for List of My Little Pony comics issued by IDW Publishing

== See also ==
- Out of the Inkwell, a 1918-1929 animated series by Max Fleischer
- The Inkpot, a sinkhole in New Mexico, USA
- Inkpot Award, at San Diego Comic-Con
