= Mount Stroumboulas =

Mountain in Greece

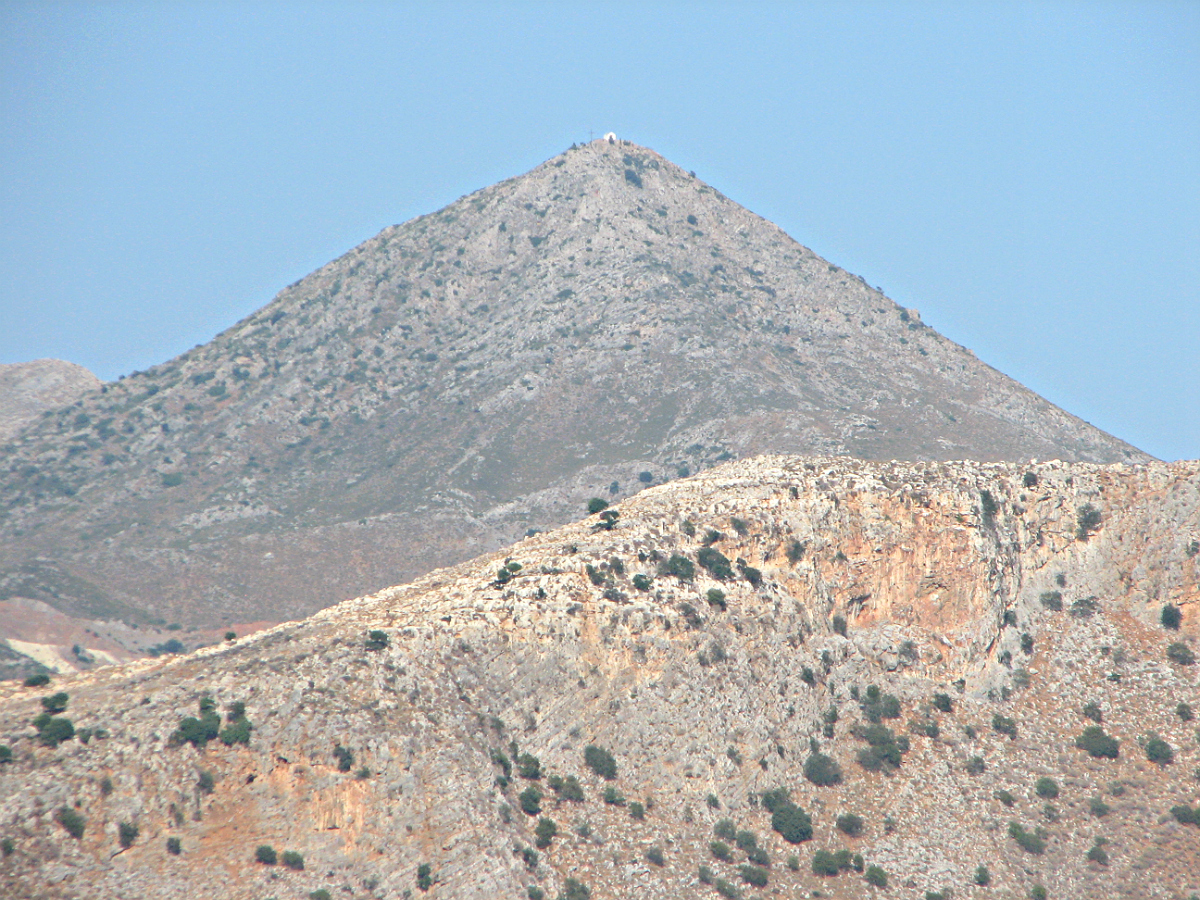
- Stroumboulas peak from the southeast

Highest point
- Elevation: 798 m (2,618 ft)
- Coordinates: 35°20′08″N 25°00′08″E

Geography
- Location within Greece
- Location: Island of Crete, Greece

Mount Stroumboulas or Stroumpoulas (Greek: Όρος Στρούμπουλας) is a mountain in northern Crete, Greece.

== Geography ==
Mt. Stroumboulas is located approximately 11 km west of Heraklion, stretching in an east to west direction; it can be considered as a north-eastern extension of Mt Ida (Psiloritis). Seen from Heraklion, its easternmost end has a distinct conical shape and is the most prominent peak in the vicinity of Heraklion.

Stroumboulas has sparse vegetation consisting mostly of phrygana. A small plateau is formed at its southern fοοt at 450 m, where a small lake with red clay water is formed during winter.

Its peak is easily accessible from the north or south slopes after a 45 minute climb and offers extensive views of almost two thirds of Crete. Visible are the peaks of Lefka Ori, Kouloukonas, Psiloritis, Asterousia, Juktas and Dikti, the gulf of Heraklion, Dia island, and the city of Heraklion.

== Etymology ==
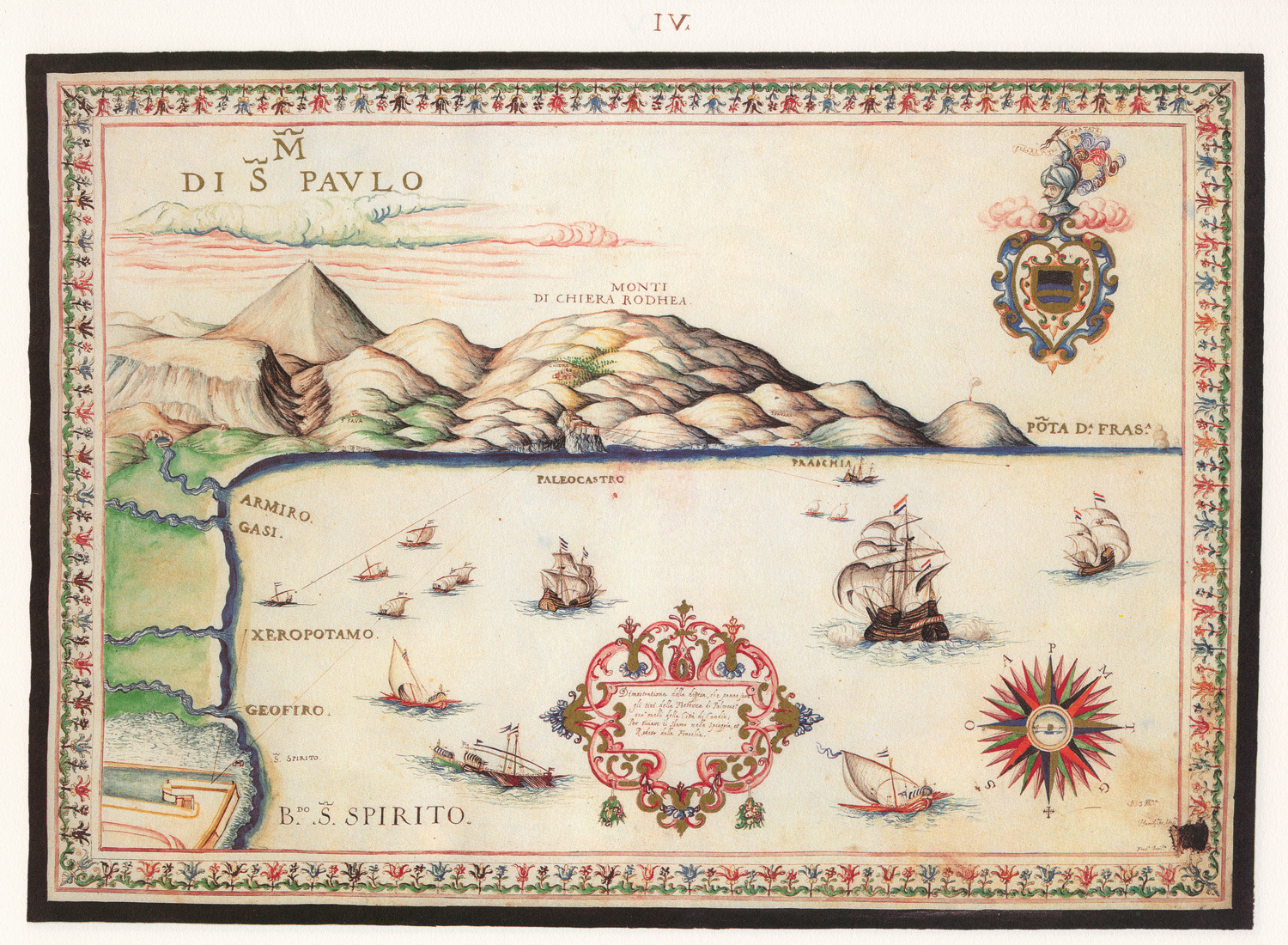
Gulf of Heraklion by Francesco Basilicata with Mt. Stroumboulas in the top left (as monte di San Paulo)

The first written reference to the name Stroumboulas dates back to 1299 in a treaty between the Kallergis family and the Republic of Venice. According to Platakis, the Venetians who were then ruling Crete, named it Stromboli due to its resemblance to the Sicilian Mt. Stromboli. This name was subsequently paraphrased as Stroumboulas. Nevertheless, maps by the Venetian Francesco Basilicata indicate Stroumboulas as monte di San Paulo. Platakis also mentions that its older name was Strogylo (Greek: Στρογγυλό, i.e. round).

== Tradition and history ==
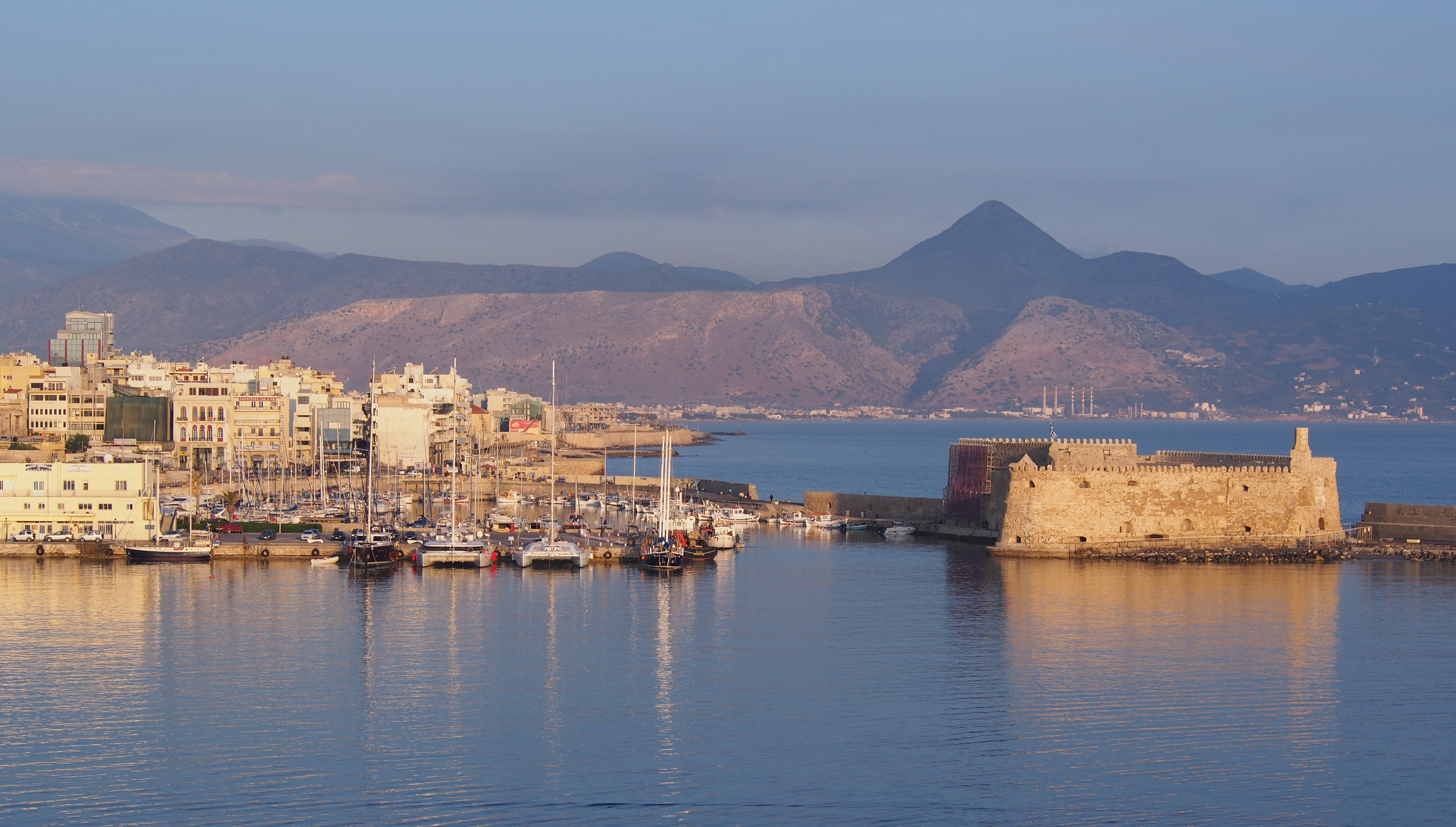
Stroumboulas in the middle right with Koules in the foreground

A small chapel dedicated to the Holy Cross (Greek: Τίμιος Σταυρός) and St. Elias (Greek: Προφήτης Ηλίας) is built on the summit. The chapel celebrates on September 14 and July 20 every year and its presence was first confirmed in 1415 by Buondelmonti. In another report dating from 1594, Filippo Pasqualigo described that the locals used to climb up the mountain on the Feast of the Cross in order to attend the Mass, a tradition that has continued until today.

During the winter of 1647–48 and before the Siege of Candia started, the Ottoman army was camped at the feet of Stroumboulas near Tylissos. More recently, during the Axis occupation of Greece in WWII, the German army set an observation outpost on Stroumboulas, which they blew up along with the chapel upon their retreat. The chapel was rebuilt after the war by the people of nearby villages.

== See also ==
- Mount Ida
- Stromboli – active volcano in Italy
- Voulismeno Aloni
