= Bayou Corne, Louisiana =

- Census-designated place
- Location within Louisiana Location within the United States
- Coordinates: 30°0′52″N 91°9′14″W
- Country: United States
- State: Louisiana
- Parish: Assumption

Area
  - Total: 0.38 sq mi (0.98 km^{2})
  - Land: 0.36 sq mi (0.94 km^{2})
  - Water: 0.015 sq mi (0.04 km^{2})
- Elevation: 7 ft (2.1 m)

Population (2020)
  - Total: 32
  - Density: 88.3/sq mi (34.11/km^{2})
- Time zone: UTC-6 (Central (CST))
  - Summer (DST): UTC-5 (CDT)
- ZIP Code: 70341 (Belle Rose)
- Area code: 985
- FIPS code: 22-05255
- GNIS feature ID: 2761293

Bayou Corne is an unincorporated community and census-designated place (CDP) in Assumption Parish, Louisiana, United States, along the bayou of the same name. It is in the northwestern part of the parish along Louisiana Highway 70, 7 miles (11 km) west of Paincourtville and 6 miles (10 km) northeast of Pierre Part. The Bayou Corne sinkhole is less than one mile to the southeast.

As of the 2020 census, Bayou Corne had a population of 32.

Bayou Corne was first listed as a CDP in 2014.

== Demographics ==
Historical population
Census	Pop.	Note	%±
2020	32		—
U.S. Decennial Census

Bayou Corne first appeared as a census designated place in the 2020 U.S. census.

=== 2020 Census ===
Bayou Corne CDP, Louisiana – Racial and ethnic composition Note: the US Census treats Hispanic/Latino as an ethnic category. This table excludes Latinos from the racial categories and assigns them to a separate category. Hispanics/Latinos may be of any race.
Race / Ethnicity (NH = Non-Hispanic)	Pop 2020	% 2020
White alone (NH)	30	93.75%
Black or African American alone (NH)	2	6.25%
Native American or Alaska Native alone (NH)	0	0.00%
Asian alone (NH)	0	0.00%
Native Hawaiian or Pacific Islander alone (NH)	0	0.00%
Other race alone (NH)	0	0.00%
Mixed race or Multiracial (NH)	0	0.00%
Hispanic or Latino (any race)	0	0.00%
Total	32	100.00%
