= Bayou Corne sinkhole =

Collapsed underground salt dome cavern in Louisiana, USA

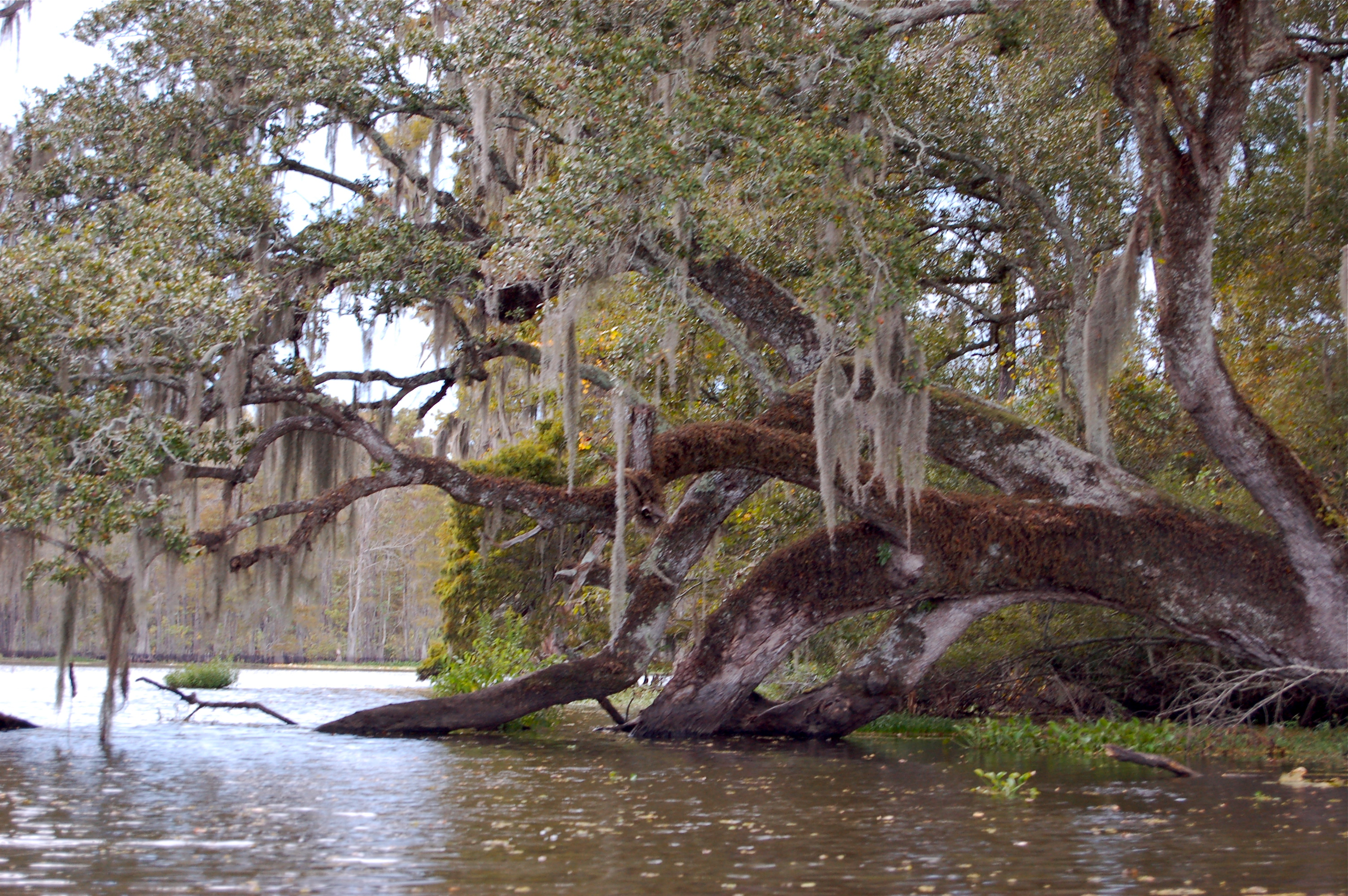
- 2010 view of Bayou Corne

- Location within Louisiana
- Location: Assumption Parish, Louisiana
- Coordinates: 30°0′40″N 91°8′35″W
- First flooded: August 3, 2012
- Surface area: 37 acres (15 ha)
- Max. depth: at least 750 ft (230 m)

The Bayou Corne sinkhole (French: Doline de Bayou Corne) was created from a collapsed underground salt dome cavern operated by Texas Brine Company and owned by Occidental Petroleum. The sinkhole, located near the community of Bayou Corne in northern Assumption Parish, Louisiana, was discovered on August 3, 2012, and 350 nearby residents were advised to evacuate. The mandatory evacuation was lifted in 2016, and the 2020 Census recorded 32 residents remained in Bayou Corne.

== Background ==
Bayous such as Bayou Corne were largely settled by the Acadians in the late 18th century, attracted to the locations for their economic potential as alligator and crawfish nesting sites. Beneath much of the state of Louisiana, including these bayous, are salt domes, gigantic deposits left during the formation of the North American continent. These domes vary wildly in scale and depth, some as much as 15,000 feet below the surface and up to 5 miles wide. With such depths and dimensions, the domes are naturally under thousands of pounds per square inch of pressure.

The economic value of salt domes has been exploited for centuries. Salt mining has been ongoing in Louisiana since the Antebellum period, and in the 20th century, the government began using these underground salt caverns as storage reservoirs for crude oil. Where there is a juncture of mining, petroleum engineering, and drilling, care must be taken to maintain stability, so as to prevent a disaster as happened at Lake Peigneur in 1980.

Bayou Corne is located in Assumption Parish, the highlighted region of southern Louisiana

The Napoleonville Dome lies beneath Assumption Parish and was characterized by 53 distinct caverns, six of which were operated by Texas Brine. One of these, Oxy3, owned by Occidental Petroleum, was more than a mile below the surface. Oxy3 was less than 100 feet from the nearest oil and gas storage-sheath, a distance that, while unsafe, was not illegal. In 2010, Texas Brine applied for a permit to expand Oxy3. Its subsequent pressure tests were unsatisfactory, yet the company felt that the cavern would be able to withstand the pressure regardless.

== Incident ==
In June 2012, residents of Bayou Corne began to notice unusual phenomena; the ground was prone to shaking, and bubbles began to arise from the water. The US Geological Survey noted an increase in seismic activity but could not point to an exact source or cause. The local government sent in experts, who suspected a natural gas pipeline leak, but that assumption proved false. As the symptoms worsened towards the end of July, Texas Brine officially denied the likelihood of a sinkhole. In reality, the Oxy3 cavern had begun to collapse.

Louisiana Governor Bobby Jindal issued an evacuation order on August 3, 2012, after residents reported smells of crude oil throughout the town. Texas Brine investigated the situation by drilling a relief well and found that the outer wall of the salt dome had collapsed, allowing sediment to pour into the cavern and oil and gas to escape to the surface, causing the shaking and bubbles residents had observed.

== Expansion ==
At first, when the sinkhole appeared, it spanned a hectare (2.5 acres). As of late February 2014, the sinkhole was 26 acres and growing. Texas Brine was responsible for managing the sinkhole and had burned off 25 million cubic feet of gas in an attempt to deplete the escaping reserves. Areas in the vicinity of Bayou Corne demonstrated a similar, bubbling-up phenomenon, though no definite connection was made between these and the original sinkhole. 3D seismic surveys in January 2014 showed that the sinkhole's expansion was slowing. As the sinkhole expanded, seismic activity would occur, causing the sinkhole to eject some debris—both solid matter and oil—which made room for more material to slough into the hole, including dirt and trees.

In 2018 the newspaper Houma Today reported that the sinkhole had grown to 34 acres. As of 2024, the sinkhole spanned 37 acres. The mandatory evacuation order was lifted in October 2016, yet by 2020 the US Census recorded only 32 residents.

== Impact ==
The residents of Bayou Corne were involved in a protracted legal battle with Texas Brine. From the start of the evacuation, each resident received checks from Texas Brine for $875 per week. Some residents received these checks without having even left the town, in defiance of the evacuation order. One such resident, Mike Schaff, said of Texas Brine's financial settlement option “They think we’re just a bunch of ignorant coonasses." Nine months after the evacuation, Governor Jindal threatened to sue Texas Brine unless they offered a buyout option to residents. Accordingly, Texas Brine offered to deal with the 350 affected residents. As of March 2014, 65 people had accepted some form of buyout. Others opted to join a class action against Texas Brine in 2014, which led to a proposed $48.1 million settlement, although some residents felt that the legal fees to be awarded ($12.03 million) were too high a percentage of the total.

The ecological effects of these developments on local flora and fauna are yet unstudied. The Atlantic’s Tim Murphy summarized the incident thusly: “Bayou Corne is the biggest ongoing industrial disaster in the United States you haven't heard of.” In September 2014, Texas Brine requested a permit to discharge wastewater back into the Bayou Corne sinkhole in an effort to fix some of the damage, which sent former and current residents of the town into a frenzy as a heated debate ensued over whether the company believed to be responsible for severe damage and loss of homes should be given permission to tamper more with an area already considered to be "deeply contaminated," as environmental advocate Nara Crowley stated.

In July 2015, Texas Brine began a series of lawsuits against Occidental Petroleum, claiming that an oil well drilled by Occidental Petroleum in 1986 triggered the cavern wall break that led to the creation of the sinkhole. Texas Brine sought $100 million in damages from Occidental Petroleum over the issue. In 2018, it was reported that a state district judge ruled that fault was shared among three companies: Texas Brine was 35% at fault, Occidental Chemical was 50% at fault, and Vulcan was 15% at fault.

== See also ==
- Döda Fallet
- List of sinkholes of the United States
- Rylands v Fletcher
