= Blue Hole (Castalia) =

Cenote in Ohio

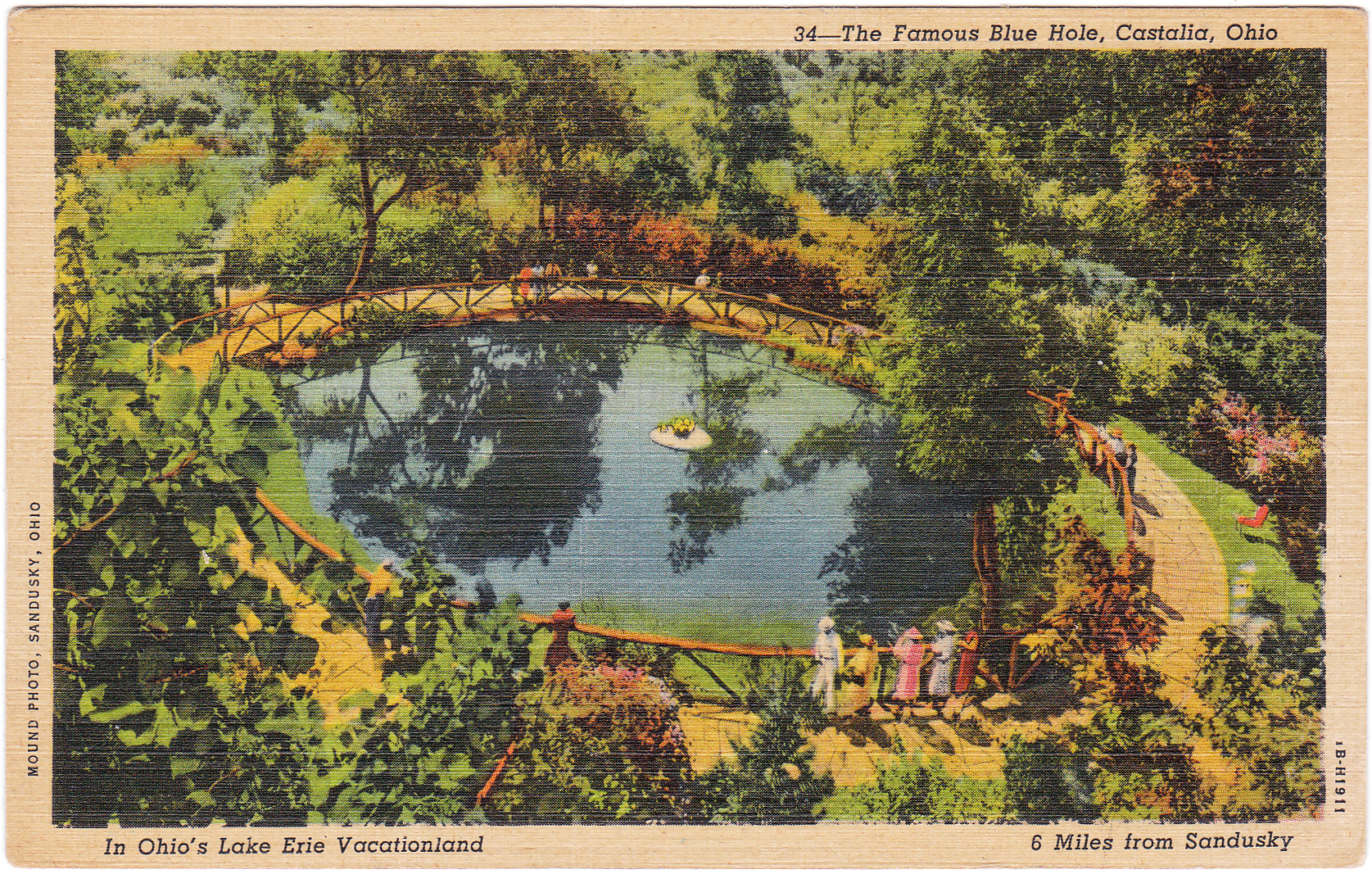
- Postcard

- Location within Ohio
- Location: Castalia, Erie County, Ohio
- Coordinates: 41°24′21.4″N 82°48′24.7″W
- Type: anoxic pond
- Etymology: From the color and the shape of the pond
- Part of: Castalia Trout Club
- Primary outflows: Sandusky Bay
- Basin countries: United States (Ohio)
- Max. length: 75 feet (23 m)
- Max. width: 75 feet (23 m)
- Max. depth: forty-three to forty-five feet (13.1 to 13.7 m)

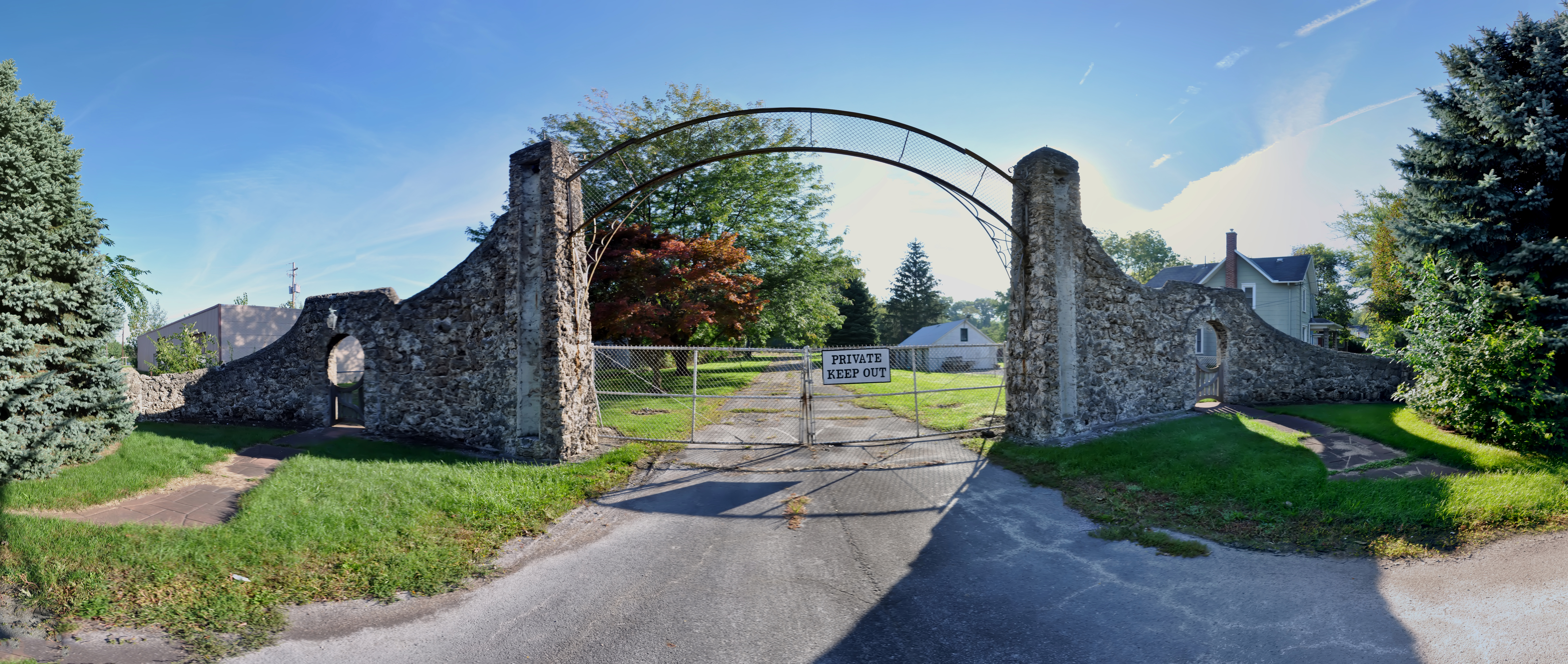
Entrance to Blue Hole

The Blue Hole is a fresh water pond and cenote located in Castalia, Ohio. From the 1920s to 1990 the Blue Hole was a tourist site, attracting 165,000 visitors annually at the height of its popularity, partly because of its location on State Route 269, about 7 miles (11 km) southwest of the Cedar Point amusement park in Sandusky, Ohio.

The Blue Hole was known to Native Americans and its first known recorded description was in 1760. The Blue Hole captured the public’s interest because of its size, about 75 feet (23 m) in diameter, clarity, vibrant blue hue, and enigmatic "bottomless" appearance. Contrary to prevalent belief, the depth of the Blue Hole is not unknown; it is 43 to 45 feet (13.1 to 13.7 m) deep. Water temperature is about 48 °F (9 °C) throughout the year. Floods and droughts have no effect on temperature or water level. The Blue Hole is fed by a passing underground stream which discharges 7 million US gallons (26,000 m^{3}; 5.8×10^{6} imp gal) of water daily into Sandusky Bay to the north, feeding into Lake Erie. The water contains lime, soda, magnesia and iron, and because the Blue Hole is anoxic, it cannot naturally sustain fish. The surrounding terrain is developed on limestone bedrock and exhibits karst topography due to dissolution of the limestone by ground water, creating a cenote, a water-filled sinkhole.

Several similar cenotes are known to local residents. The Blue Hole is now off limits to the public. It is located on the grounds of Castalia Trout Club, a privately owned fishing club. It is distinguished from another cenote, similar in size and bluish-green color, owned by the Castalia State Fish Hatchery and operated by the Ohio Department of Natural Resources, Division of Wildlife, which is open for public viewing and which has grown in popularity since the closure of the Blue Hole in the late 1990s.

== See also ==
- List of sinkholes of the United States
