= Narlıkuyu =

- Neighbourhood
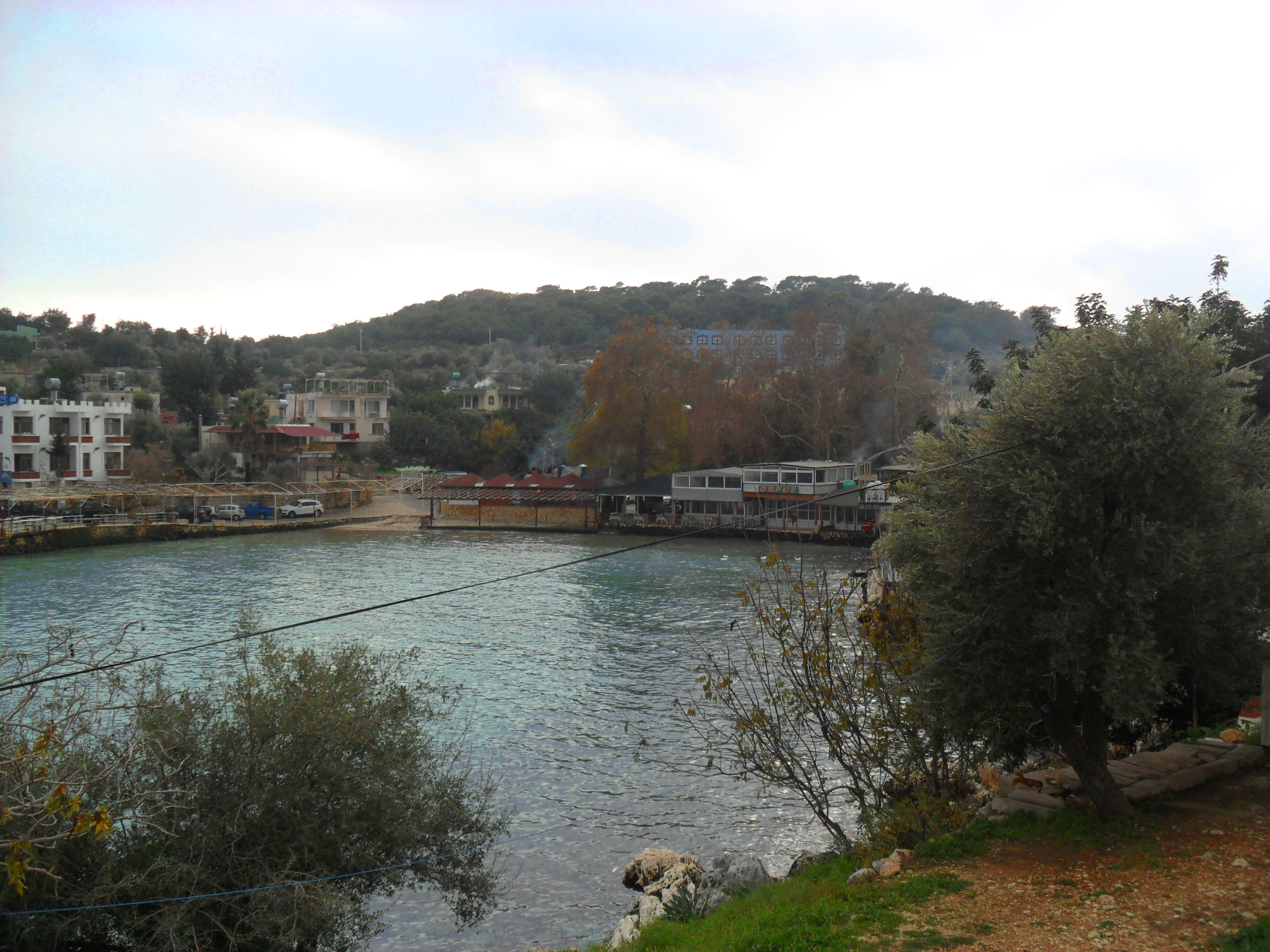
- Narlıkuyu bay

- Location within Turkey
- Coordinates: 36°27′N 34°07′E
- Country: Turkey
- Province: Mersin
- District: Silifke
- Elevation: 25 m (82 ft)
- Population (2022): 2,476
- Time zone: UTC+3 (TRT)
- Postal code: 33940
- Area code: 0324

Narlıkuyu (Turkish pronunciation: [naɾ'lɯ'kuju]; lit. 'pomegranate well' in Turkish) is a neighbourhood in the municipality and district of Silifke, Mersin Province, Turkey. Its population is 2,476 (2022). Before the 2013 reorganisation, it was a town (belde).

== History ==
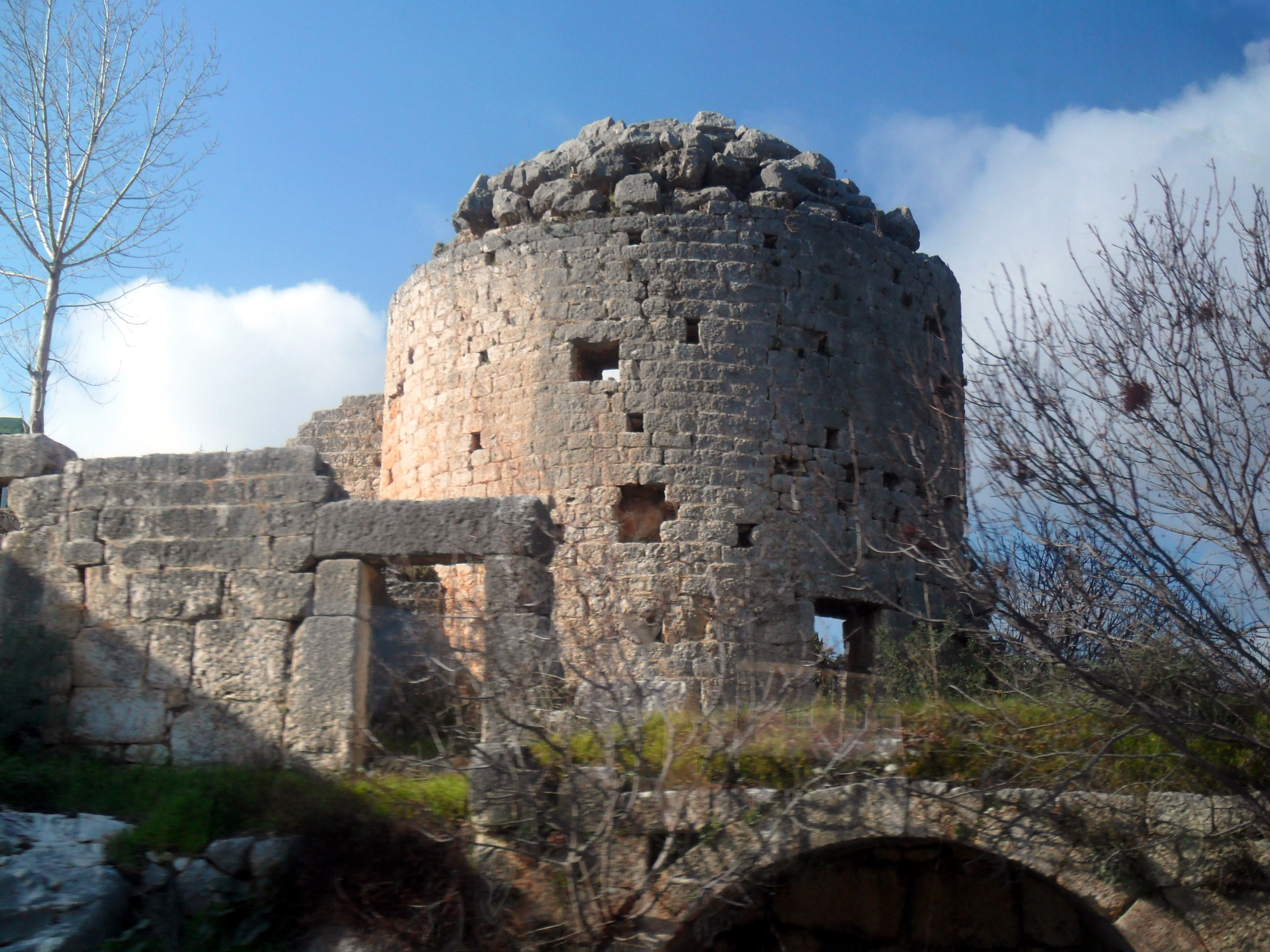
A church ruin in Hasanaliler neighbourhood of Narlıkuyu

A small 4th century building, once part of a bath and baptism complex financed by Poimenios of Corycus, survives to the present in the area (see Narlıkuyu Museum).

The name of the area was recorded as Porto Calamie (lit. 'reeds harbor' in Italian) by Italian cartographers during the 15th century. The earliest modern record of the settlement has been made by the Turkish Statistical Institute in 1980 as Narlıdere. Previously the settlement consisted of a deserted bay and a few houses, but in 1994 the municipal organization was established under the name of Narlıkuyu.

== Geography ==
Narlıkuyu is situated on the Mediterranean coast, located 65 kilometres (40 mi) south west of Mersin. It is on the Mersin Antalya highway between two districts of Mersin; Erdemli and Silifke.

The town has many popular fishing restaurants, located around a small bay famous for its unusually cool and fresh water, fed by underground freshwater streams.

== Administration ==
The township was established in 1994 with the fusion of several small villages.

== See also ==
- Cennet and Cehennem
