= Numby Numby =

Sinkhole in Australia

- Ngambingambi (Yanyuwa)
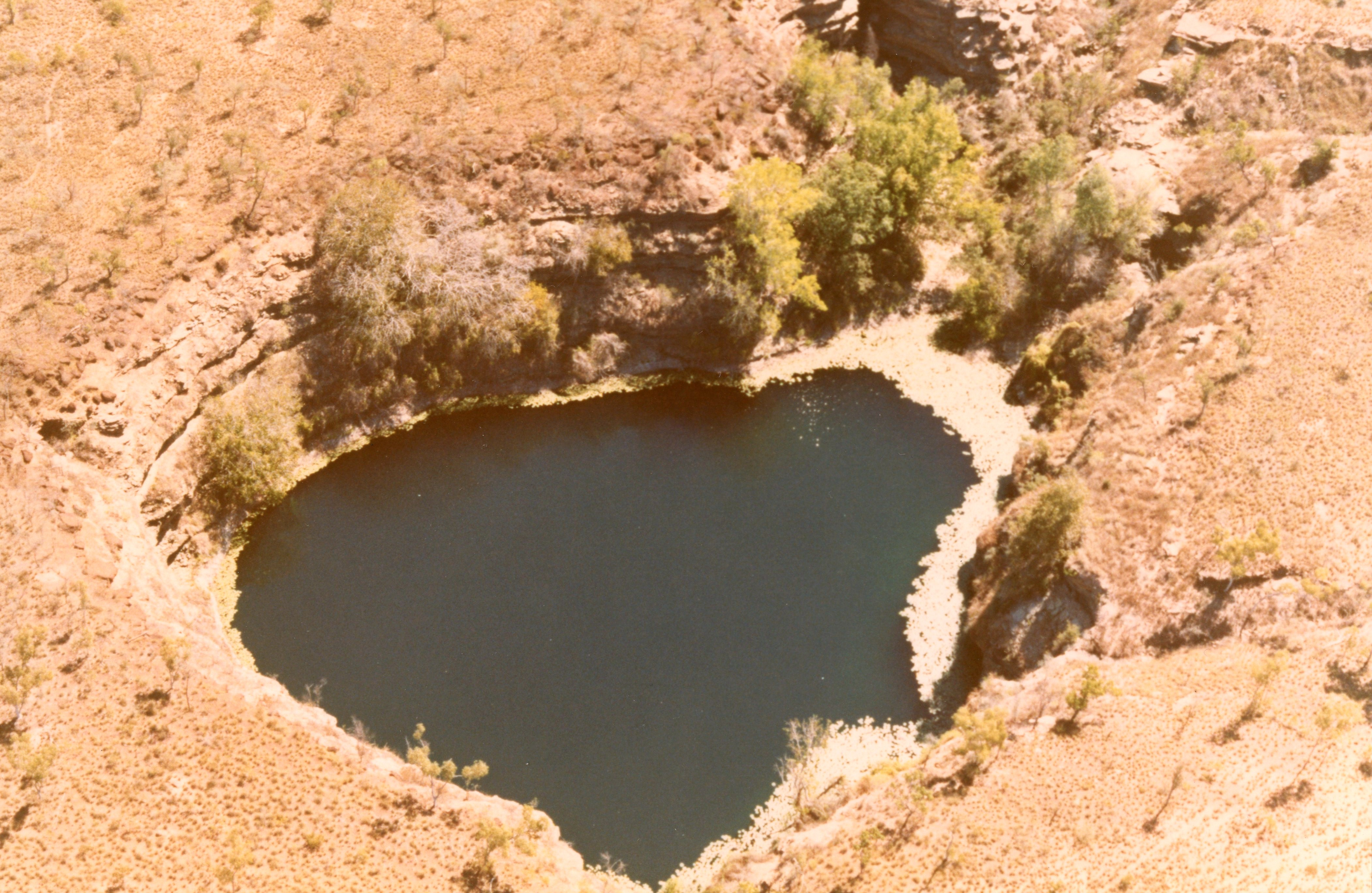
- Aerial view

- Location within Australia
- Location: Northern Territory, Australia
- Coordinates: 15°58′33″S 136°04′07″E
- Type: Sinkhole

Numby Numby, also known as Nimby Nimby or Ngambingambi, is a sinkhole in the Northern Territory of Australia in the locality of McArthur about 25 to 30 kilometres (16 to 19 mi) west-northwest of Borroloola.

== Description ==
The sinkhole provides a good environment for swimming, since the water source is a hot spring hidden in the depths, bringing the water temperature to 32 °C (90 °F). Surrounded by high cliffs, the water is only accessible via a washout that breaks through the North West side, providing a steep path to the water's edge. Large lily pads dominate the shallows. The depth is at least 60 metres (200 ft) within a short distance from the shoreline.

== Legend ==
In the Indigenous languages of the area, Yanyuwa, Garrwa, Gudanji and Marra, the sinkhole is known as Ngambingambi. It is an important site associated with the activities of the Rainbow Serpent (Bujimala) and two newly initiated men (rduwarra wujara). The two young men had travelled from the McArthur River, just downstream from the town of Borroloola. As they traveled they began to kill flying foxes, creatures kin to the Rainbow Serpent who was dwelling underground at Ngambingambi. On arrival at Ngambingambi the Rainbow Serpent was so angry, he burst through the ground, creating the sinkhole. He then carried the two young men back to the McArthur River and downstream to the Sir Edward Pellew Islands. The two young men reside on Pearce and Urquart islands. The Rainbow Serpent is said to dwell between these two islands watching the boys.

== See also ==
- List of sinkholes of Australia
