= Voulismeno Aloni =

Sinkhole in Crete

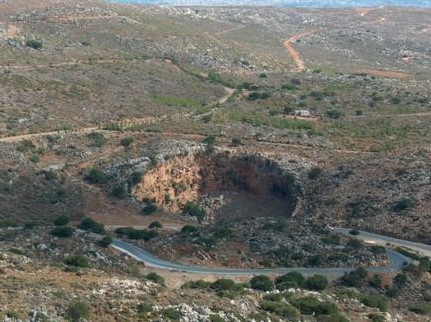
Voulismeno Aloni, a sinkhole in Malevizi, Crete, Greece.

Voulismeno Aloni (Greek: Βουλισμένο Αλώνι, lit. 'sunken threshing floor') is a sinkhole located at the feet of Mount Stroumboulas, next to the old national road, at the 14th kilometer from Heraklion to Rethymnon, on the island of Crete (35°19′48″N, 25°01′05″E).

It is a ground subsidence with a circular shape up to 90 meters in diameter. Its slopes are steep and vertical reaching up to 60 meters of height from the bottom of the formation. Descent into the interior is feasible on foot from the southwestern side following a certain pathway.

Geologists believe that it is a sinkhole, formed by the depression of a cave, during the Pleistocene period.

In spite of what its name implies, it is believed that it was never used as a threshing floor.
