= The Inkpot =

Sinkhole in New Mexico, United States

Coordinates: 33°36′30″N 104°25′35″W

The Inkpot is a 90-foot-deep (27 m) sinkhole located at the Salt Creek Wilderness Area north of Roswell, New Mexico. This geological formation can be found at the foot of the scenic Red Bluffs protected area. It is light green in color, and features a hidden cave leading to the water. It is home to great horned owls, barn owls, and the Pecos pupfish.

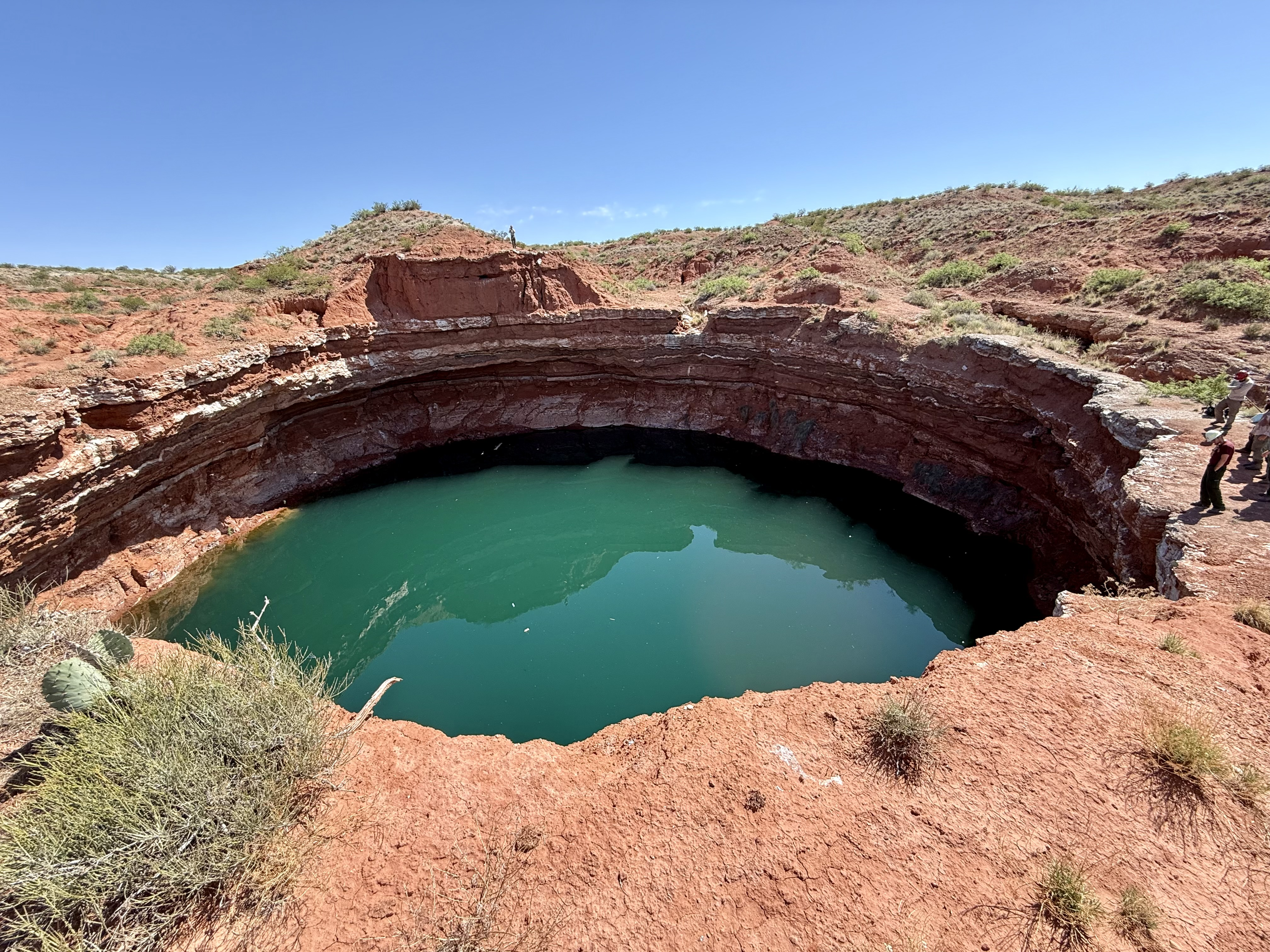
View to the NE.

== See also ==
- List of sinkholes of the United States
