= Mount Helena City Park =

Mountain and city park in Helena, Montana

Coordinates: 46°35′23″N 112°03′31″W

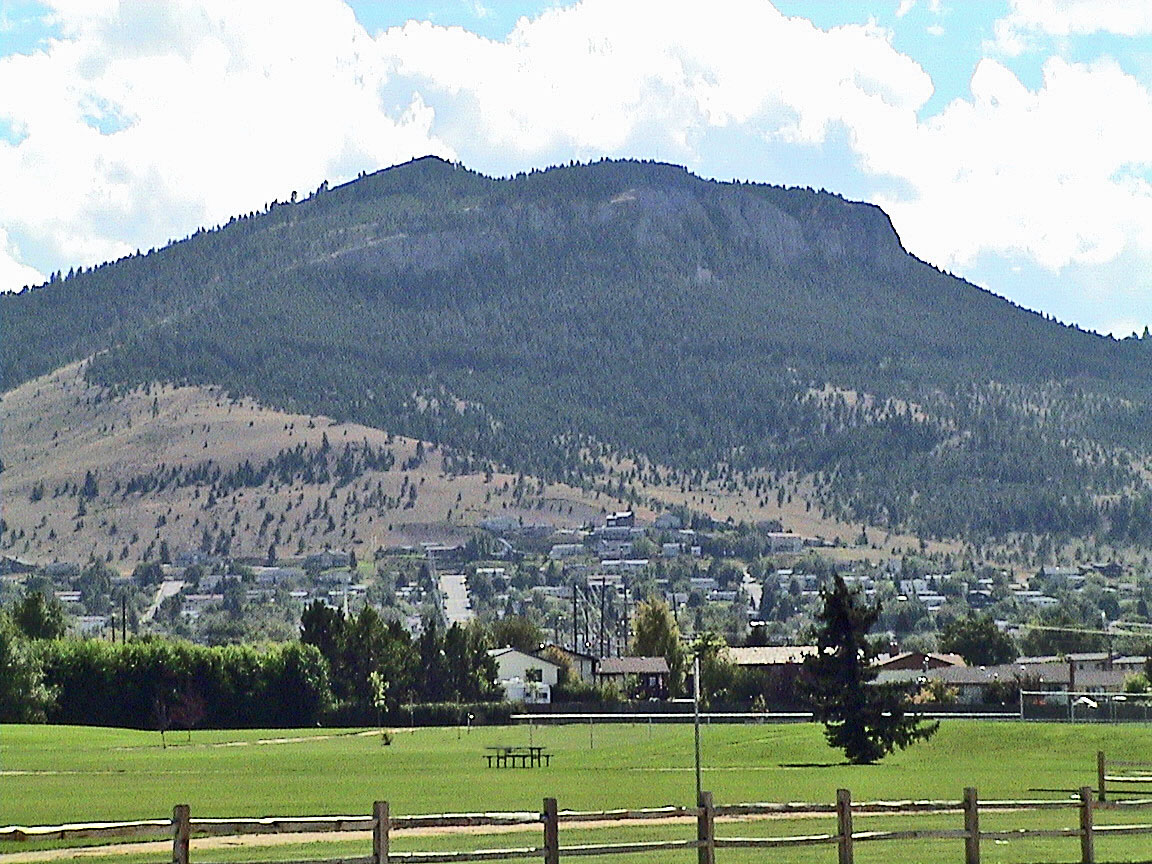
Mount Helena viewed from the north.

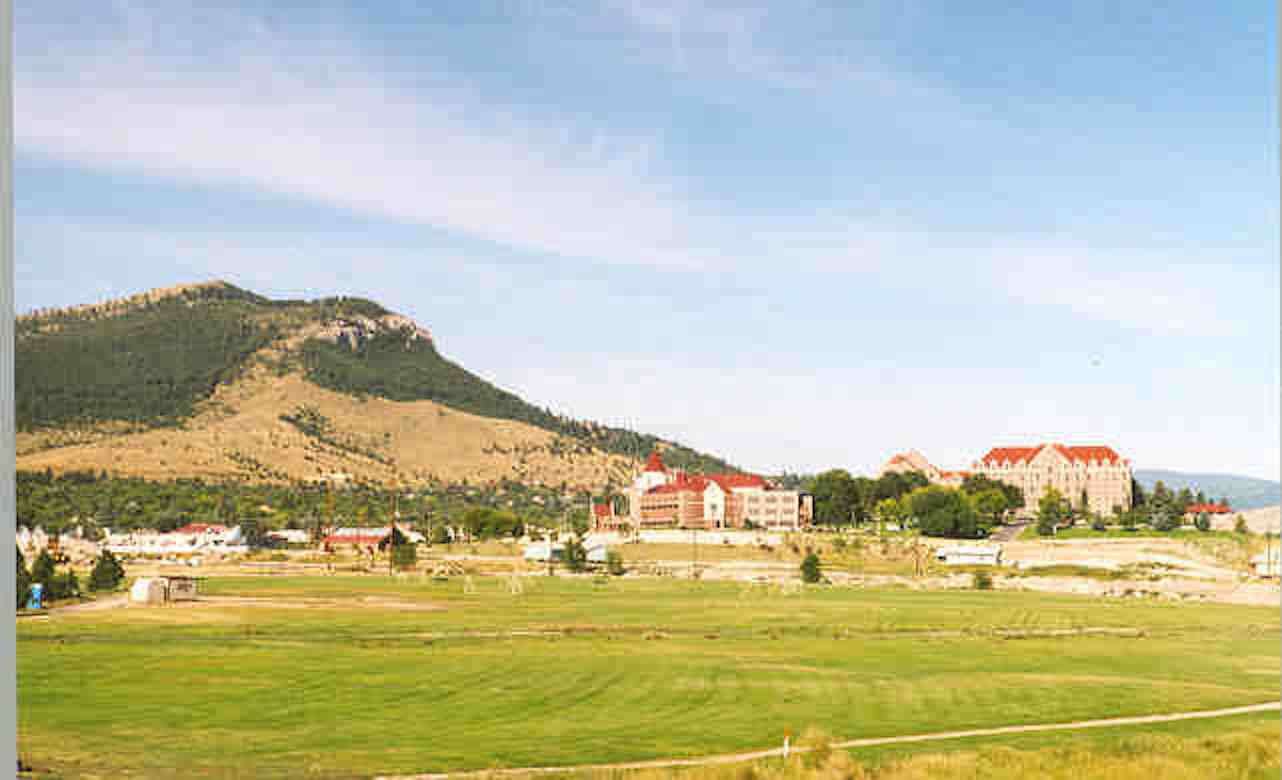
Mount Helena viewed from the northeast. Carroll College is to the right.

Mount Helena City Park is a 620-acre (2.5 km^{2}) park in Helena, Montana. The park encompasses Mount Helena which rises 5,468 feet (1,667 m) above sea level, overlooking the city of Helena 1,300 feet (396 m) below. The park includes six trails up and around the mountain, some of which connect to other trails in nearby Helena National Forest. Other trails go to the cave nicknamed "Devil's Kitchen", to the big letter "H" on the side of the mountain (the "H" was repainted April 2015 for the first time since 2008) overlooking the city, and to the summit of the mountain. The park is free of admission and is maintained by the City of Helena and local conservation and recreation groups from the Helena area. It was listed on the National Register of Historic Places in 1997.

== Trails ==
Trail	Description	Photo
1906 Trail	Easiest route to the top. Views of limestone caves and Devil's Kitchen along the way. Sports climbing routes available.	1906 Trail in July 2018.
Powerline Trail	The most direct way to the top from the Trail Head –steep grade. Is difficult to climb up, and more so to manage your way down. Exercise caution.	
Prairie Trail	A meandering way to reach the summit, its switchbacks are perforce more challenging.	
Backside Trail	Passes through a grassy woodland, offering views of numerous pine trees.	Backside Trail in July 2018.
Hogback Trail	A rough trail leading from the summit to the hogback ridge. Recommended to travel downwards. Panoramic views of Helena and the park.	
Prospector Shafts Trail	A very long trail through the southeast quarter of the park. Offers a wide variety of landscapes and prospector shafts halfway through the trail.	
West End Trail	A trail through the most remote part of the park. Travels through a meadow and leads to Mount Helena Ridge trail in Helena National Forest.	West End Trail in July 2018.
