= NR-1 Sinkhole =

Underwater sinkhole

Coordinates: 24°14′00″N 82°18′15″W

The NR-1 Sinkhole is a giant underwater sinkhole located in the Straits of Florida 40 miles (64 km) southwest of Key West, Florida. It is found at an approximate depth of 1,886 feet (575 m) of water at the foot of the Pourtales Escarpment, an area of Quaternary sediment. It was discovered in October 1994 during a survey conducted by the American submarine NR-1, a U.S. Navy nuclear research submarine, and is named for the submarine. It was first identified via side-scan sonar and near-bottom echo sounder data, prompting a second survey in May 1995 to confirm the finding.

Discovery of the NR-1 Sinkhole prompted scientific interest, as sinkholes are generally believed to form only in environments which are subaerial, or exposed to the air. In contrast, the NR-1 Sinkhole is believed to be too deep underwater for the area to have been exposed to the air during formation in the Neogene. It was the first documented evidence suggesting that it is possible for karst sinkholes to form entirely underwater.
