= 2024 Kuala Lumpur sinkhole =

Sinkhole in Malaysia

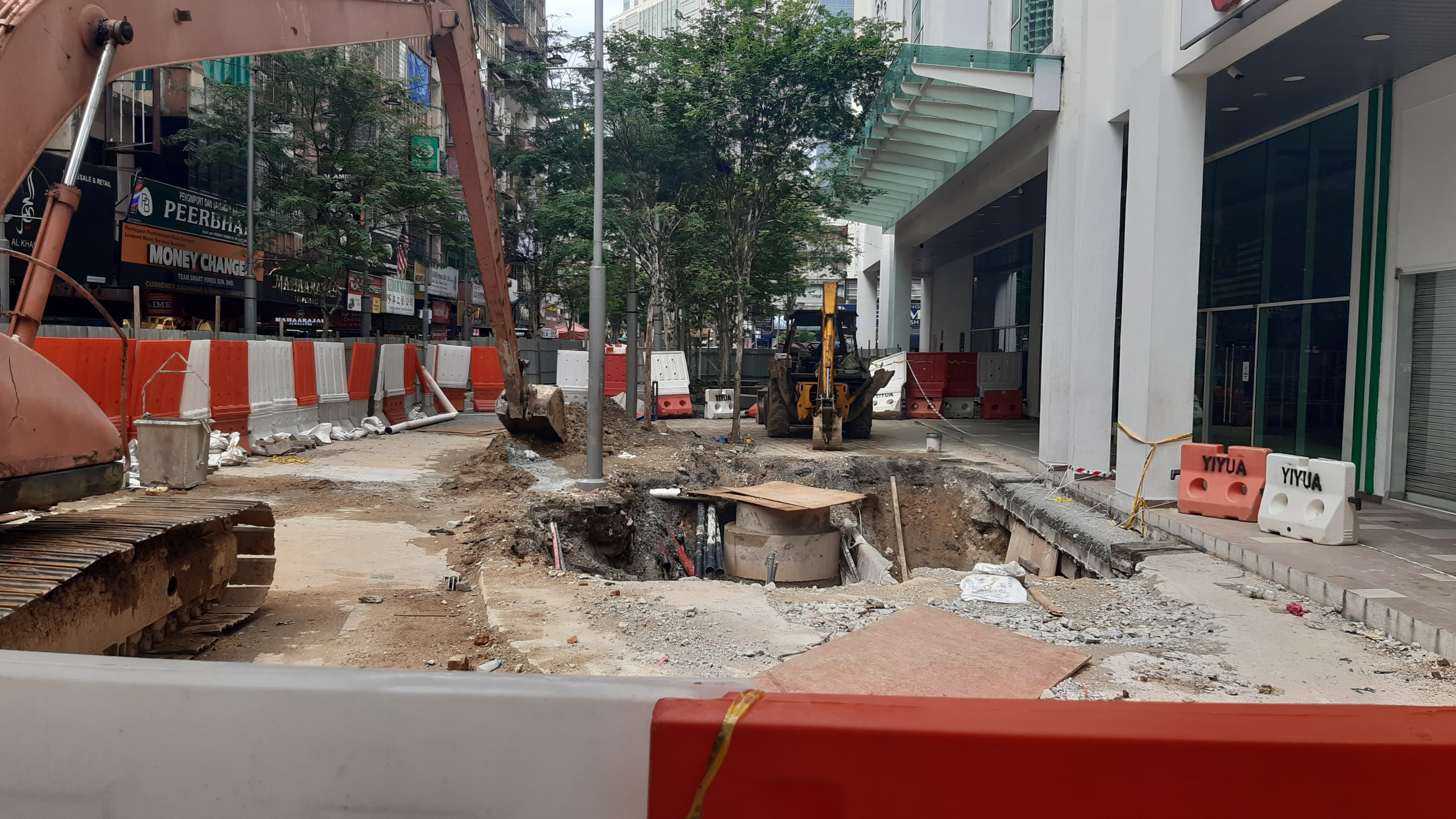
- The sinkhole pictured on 15 September 2024

- Kuala Lumpur sinkhole (Kuala Lumpur) Kuala Lumpur sinkhole (Malaysia)
- Date: 23 August 2024
- Time: 8:22 a.m. (MST)
- Location: Kuala Lumpur, Malaysia
- Also known as: Jalan Masjid India sinkhole
- Type: Sinkhole
- Cause: Geographical factors
- Outcome: Disappearance of Vijayalakshmi Gali
- Missing: 1

The 2024 Kuala Lumpur sinkhole, also known as the Jalan Masjid India sinkhole, is an 8-metre (26 ft) deep sinkhole that formed in Jalan Masjid India in Kuala Lumpur, Malaysia, on 23 August 2024, possibly caused by sewage pipe ruptures and geographical faults. Its collapse has caused one victim to disappear.

The search and rescue team have identified the victim through CCTV footage to be a woman of Indian descent named Vijayalakshmi Gali. As of 29 August 2024, she still remains missing. However, the government of Malaysia has declared Vijayalakshmi Gali legally dead on 1 September 2024.

== Background and incident ==
On 23 August 2024, an Indian woman named Vijayalakshmi Gali (aged 48), who was from Kuppam, Andhra Pradesh, India, was believed to be residing in Kuala Lumpur on a tourist visa. She was on her way to a nearby Hindu temple with her friend and was walking along the road of Jalan Masjid India, when the tiled floor that she stepped on suddenly fell in, leaving a square-shaped hole over an 8-metre-deep sinkhole where a broken sewerage pipe sits at the bottom. She completely disappeared and was suspected to have fallen right into the sewerage pipe and got swept away into the sewerage system. At 8:22 a.m., the surrounding locals made an emergency call to the Fire and Rescue Department of Malaysia, and an immediate ground search began.

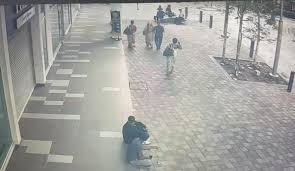
CCTV footage shows the location of the sinkhole seconds before it appeared.

== Timeline ==
=== 23 August 2024 ===
At about 8.20am, the victim, later identified as Vijayalakshmi Gali from India, falls into an 8m-deep sinkhole on Jalan Masjid India in the Malaysian capital. She was reportedly on a two-month holiday with her family and was due to return home soon. Firefighters and fire engines were immediately deployed to the incident scene. The Operations and Tactical and Rescue Special Team as well as the Fire Department's tracking dogs were soon called in. Excavators were brought in to dig up the ground to expand the search area.

=== 24 August 2024 ===
On 24 August, rescuers barricaded part of the area and used an excavator to clear debris from the sinkhole, but there was no immediate sign of the victim in the initial day. Local police chief Sulizmie Affendy Sulaiman declined to comment when asked about the possible condition of the woman, or the cause of the incident. Kuala Lumpur police chief Rusdi Mohamad Isa said there was a strong water flow underground and the woman might have been swept away. Mr. Rusdi was quoted by the national Bernama news agency as saying the search required careful planning because it involved public infrastructure. The cause of the sinkhole is not yet known. The exact same day the rescue team released CCTV footage of the incident to the public and advised citizens to take safety precautions.

=== 25 August 2024 ===
On 25 August, Malaysian prime minister Anwar Ibrahim expressed his sympathy and condolences to the victim's family and instructed them to go to the Kuala Lumpur City Hall for a meeting. The rescue team later inspected all of the 6 manholes that surround the Jalan Masjid India area. Later that day during the search the woman's slippers were found by the operation team. A Kuala Lumpur Fire and Rescue Department official said the water level of the sewerage system in question was relatively low, although it was flowing rapidly.

=== 26 August 2024 ===
On 26 August, the authorities confirmed that no new leads had been uncovered by the search and rescue team. The SAR team began their search at 9.30am with 104 members from various security agencies and authorities but failed to produce any results after they searched through five of six Indah Water Konsortium sewer manholes again on that day. At about 10pm MST, Kuala Lumpur City Hall cordons off an area in the suburb of Kampung Kerinchi several kilometres away from Jalan Masjid India after the collapse drain created a large hole on Jalan Pantai Permai.

=== 27 August 2024 ===
On 27 August, in an effort to support the rescue operation, a Singaporean waste management company, Jetters Incz Pte Ltd, offered their assistance voluntarily and free of charge to search for the missing victim. However, continuing works have been ongoing for the search of the victim remain unsolved. And the search was later temporarily suspended that day due to heavy rain. Shops in the Masjid India area say business has declined significantly as locals and tourists stay away. Residents in sinkhole-prone areas of Kuala Lumpur such as Brickfields call on authorities to publish the city's underground mapping system to stay informed about the infrastructure beneath their neighbourhoods.

=== 28 August 2024 ===
The search for the victim still continues. However political MP's in Malaysia have urged authorities to release the preliminary report on the sinkhole and to implement a mapping system to safeguard residents in vulnerable areas. Authorities have decided to close the road portion of Jalan Masjid India, however the foot path to walk still remains open to the public. Authorities have found out the missing woman's full legal name and passport details and announced the update to the public.

=== 29 August 2024 ===
As of 29 August 2024, Vijayalakshmi Gali remains missing for a week with no traces and clues in where the remains could be located. Deputy director-general of Operations Datuk Ahmad Izram Osman said the obstruction was detected by the K9 unit dogs named Denti and Frankie which were deployed at the site on Tuesday (27 August) afternoon, along with camera surveillance. He stated, "From the sniffing conducted by our K9 team, it seems there is a strong indication toward that area, so we will make efforts to search there."The cameras also indicate there is an obstruction, which suggests the victim may be trapped there or there’s some other object, so we want to search that area." Which he told news reports at the scene of incident. He added to his statement that efforts to pump out sewage water are currently underway to facilitate the movement of divers from the department's Water Rescue Team. Ahmad Izram stated that the diving operation will commence at 2am on Thursday (29 August), involving eight divers supported by 75 personnel overseeing machinery and logistics. Later that day, the press and authorities announced that there is still no new leads with the discovery of the woman which is caused by rising water levels and undercurrents halt divers progress from reaching obstruction in sinkhole making it very difficult for rescue team to continue the search for that day. At 11.20 pm MST time, a crane was seen arriving at the scene, extracting an object from the sinkhole and deploying high-powered pumps with capacities of 10,000 and 20,000 litres to drain water from the sewer channel.

=== 30 August 2024 ===
On the early morning of 30 August, the Fire and Rescue Department of Malaysia (JBPM) attempt to locate Vijayalakshmi Gali by exploring a nearby sewer channel has once again ended in failure. Earlier that early morning reporters saw two scuba divers from the JBPM Northern Region Academy began descending into the sewer channel at roughly 4am MST time to reach a suspected backlog area approximately 44 metres from the incident site. The dive was conducted after the SAR team sealed off part of the channel and redirected the inflow to reduce the water level from 1.5 metres to 0.8 metres employing the same method as the previous day (29 August). At 2pm (MST), the SAR team halted the search at Jalan Masjid India due to the operations for rescue being done labeled as "too risky and unsafe". However, the team continue the search at Pantai Dalam IWK sewage plant. Prime minister of Malaysia Anwar Ibrahim stated that "KL is still safe for tourist." in a press conference in Penang.

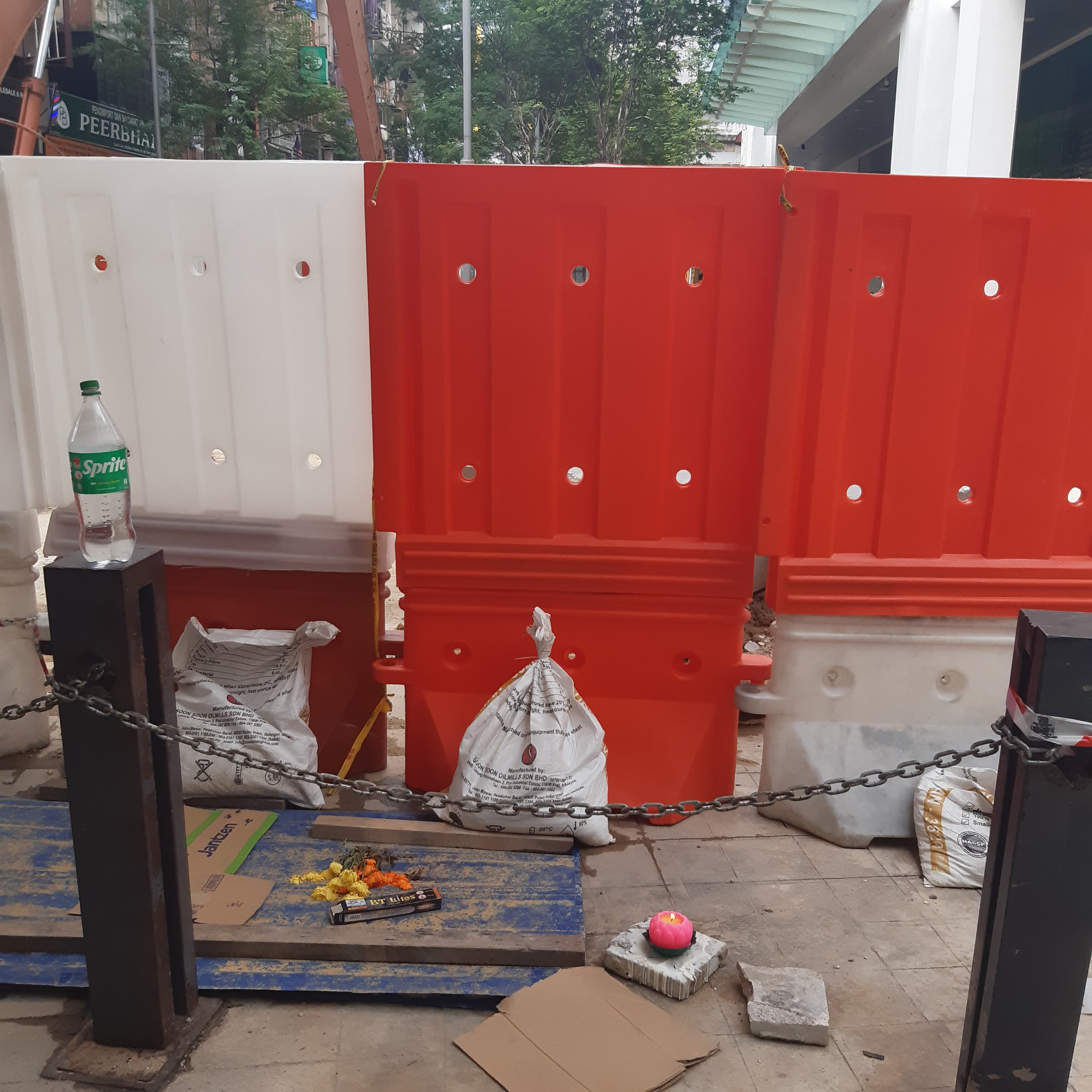
Flowers and a burning candle left at the perimeter of the sinkhole exclusion zone in memory of Vijayalakshmi Gali

=== 31 August 2024 ===
Authorities announced that the Lorong Tuanku Abdul Rahman night market will be closed on Saturday (31 August) to make way for the search and rescue operation (SAR) for the search of Vijayalakshmi Gali and soil tests. Kuala Lumpur City Hall (DBKL) said in a statement today that soil tests will be conducted around Lorong Tuanku Abdul Rahman and Jalan Masjid India to identify locations and road safety around the sinkhole area. The statement given by DBKL said "The closure is to ensure the safety of the public and businesses. Failure to comply with the order will result in strict action against businesses". The search for the victim resumed at 8am MST time. Various techniques, including jetting, flushing and extracting water from the incident site, have been employed in the effort to locate Vijayalakshmi. However, the search and rescue (SAR) operation has yet to yield any results. The crew used a telescopic camera was used by the SAR team from last night to help locate the location of Vijayalakshmi. The camera equipment combines the technology found in push rod and crawler cameras and was offered free of charge by a private entity to the SAR team. It is hoped that using the camera will help the team obtain clearer images, especially at the second manhole in the search area clogged with debris and backlog.

=== 1 September 2024 ===
The Malaysian authorities have decided to permanently cancel the SAR operation due to the risky and challenging conditions of the sinkhole and the search methods being used. Zaliha Mustafa added to her statement stating that “Apart from that, we need to resume normal activities here and ensure the safety of the people using these streets.” Many citizens reports noted that Kuala Lumpur City Hall (DBKL) would be responsible for utility mapping, land structure analysis, and engaging with vendors to help them resume their activities. Zaliha further confirmed that the victim's family has been informed of the decision and their visas have been extended for another week to accommodate them as they navigate this tragedy.

== Second sinkhole ==
After the incident on Jalan Masjid India on 23 August, another new sinkhole appeared on 28 August in the same street just 50 meters away from the first sinkhole at around 2:30am. However, authorities have confirmed that no casualties disappeared, injured or dead.

== Possible causes ==
=== Burst water pipe ===
The Institute of Engineers, Malaysia (IEM) also noted in a statement after the incident that the sinkhole appears to be about 24m from Klang River. That said, cave-ins can also be human-induced, said Dr Lim. A 10m-deep sinkhole on a road in the Golden Triangle area of Kuala Lumpur in 2014 was caused by a burst water pipe, for instance. Based on photos and videos taken of the Jalan Masjid India site, last Friday's incident could be associated with utilities, IEM president Jeffrey Chiang Choong Luin said on Sunday. There have been several similar incidents in Kuala Lumpur in the past few years, but they may not have been reported as the cave-ins “didn’t swallow people or cars”, added Dr Lim. This was based on the 2014 incident that took place in Malaysia.

=== Geographical factors ===
Deputy Prime Minister of Malaysia, Fadillah Yusof commented that the sinkhole is caused by faults in the geographical and soil structures factors. He explained that the limestone soil composition in that particular area disrupts the flow of underground water which later results in leading to soil instability and later resulting in the formation of a sinkhole. A Malaysian geologist later clarified that such incidents are often driven by natural factors, particularly in areas with underlying limestone.

=== Heavy rain ===
Dr Nor Shahidah Mohd Nazer who is an expert in geological engineering and soil mechanics from Universiti Kebangsaan Malaysia (UKM), said the situation was most likely exacerbated by heavy precipitation that the city experienced earlier, leading to ground saturation and fast flow of underground water.

== Reactions ==
=== Domestic ===
- Prime Minister's office – Prime Minister Anwar Ibrahim expressed his concern and shock over the event and expressed his condolences to the family of the victim in person.
- (Malaysia) Federal government – Dang Wangi district's police chief and Assistant Commissioner Sulizmie Sulaiman said that debris comprising rocks and pieces of concrete that had been swept along by strong water currents are obstructing access along sewer lines closest to the sinkhole.

=== International ===
- Singapore – Singapore drainage company volunteers to help search for the victim free of charge.
- India – Indian high commissioner to Malaysia B.N. Reddy visited the location of the incident to express his grief and condolences to the victims family of behalf of India.

== Aftermath ==
=== Cancellation of Merdeka eve celebrations ===
On 28 August 2024, the 2024 Merdeka Eve celebrations which was organised by the Kuala Lumpur City Hall (DBKL) scheduled to take place at Independence Square on 30 August have been cancelled. The DBKL administers announced in a post on its Facebook page on Wednesday (28 August) that the cancellation was in respect of the victim and a number of recent incidents around the city of Kuala Lumpur.

== Controversy ==
On 27 August 2024, some Malaysians accused that the Minister in the Prime Minister's Department (Federal Territories) of Malaysia Zaliha Mustafa did not visit the site of the tragedy and was being negligent from her duties as an office holder. However she later made a public statement stating that “I deny this accusation. This is indeed a matter that, as a minister, I must pay serious attention to matters related to the safety of the residents.” After further investigation into her issue authorities later confirmed that Zahila visited the incident location on Saturday (24 August) one day after the incident took place. She also stated that when she received information about the incident, she was still in Kuching, Sarawak and as soon as she arrived in Kuala Lumpur and she went to the location to obtain the latest developments from the authorities.

Mayor of Kuala Lumpur Maimunah Mohd Sharif and Minister Zaliha Mustafa assured authorities and citizens stating that "KL is still safe." However many citizens oppose their statement and voiced out saying it Kuala Lumpur is unsafe until the sinkholes stop in Jalan Masjid India.
