= Devil's Kitchen Sinkhole =

Sinkhole in Arizona

- Sinkhole
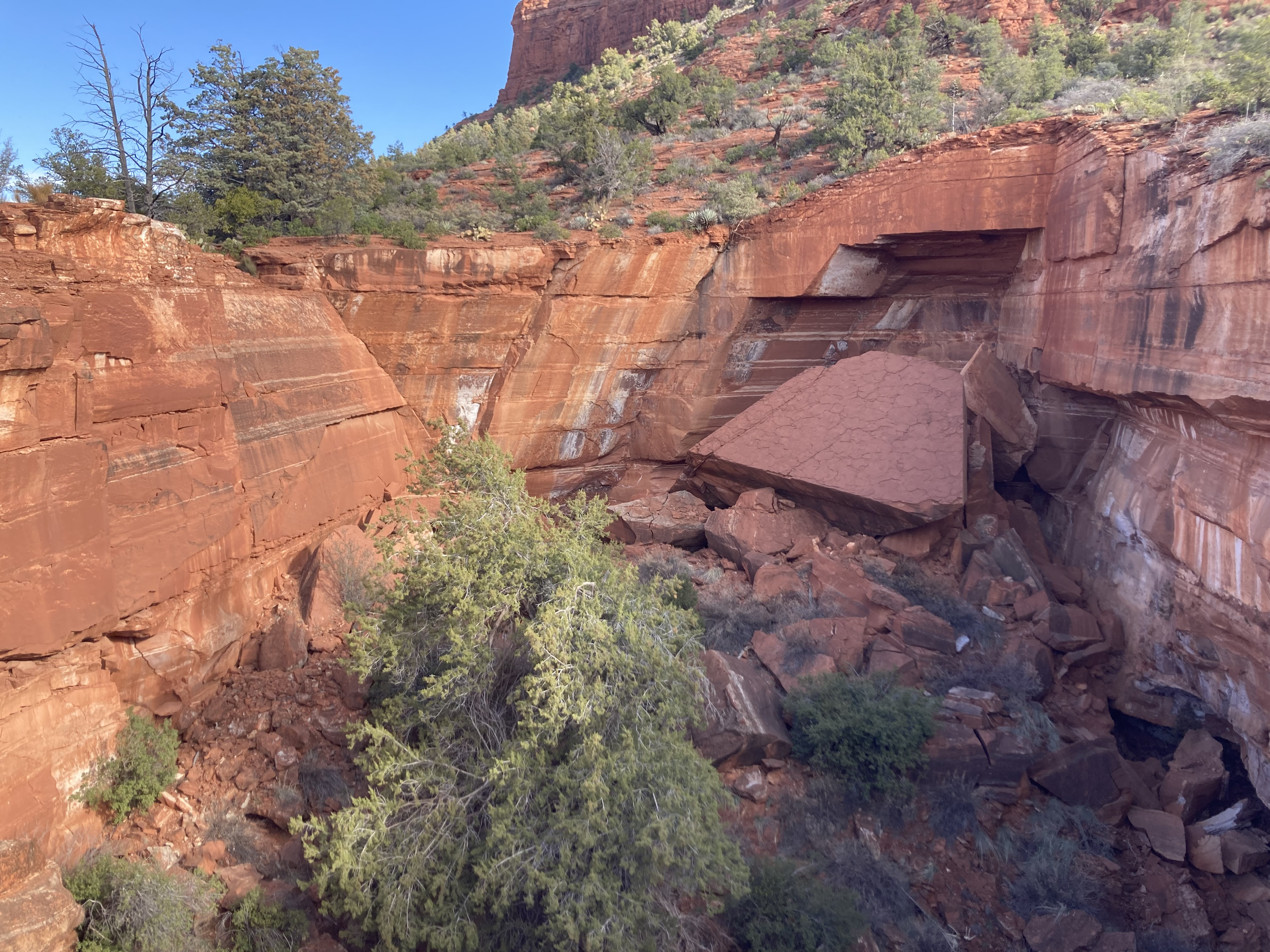
- The sinkhole in 2024

- Coordinates: 34.8864°N 111.7825°W
- Location: Soldier Pass Trail, Coconino National Forest
- Age: ~130-140 years
- Formed by: Subsidence

Area
  - Total: 13,800 ft (4,200 m)

Dimensions
  - Length: 150 ft (46 m)
  - Width: 92 ft (28 m)
  - Depth: 660 ft (200 m); 840 ft (260 m) (including cave)
- Elevation: 4,510 ft (1,370 m) (top)

The Devil's Kitchen Sinkhole is a sinkhole near Sedona, Arizona on the Soldier Pass Trail in the Coconino National Forest. Formed in the late 1880s, it is one of the at least seven sinkholes surrounding the city. The sinkhole is about 660 ft (200 m) deep but leads to a cave that adds 180 ft (55 m), for a total of 840 ft (260 m). Its interior contains vegetation.

== Geology ==
The sinkhole was formed by subsidence into caverns of paleokarst composed of Redwall Limestone of the Pennsylvanian subperiod. After the second collapse, a large block was displaced. Many of the edges of the broken-off rocks were very angular. This was different on the south wall, however, as it had rounded rocks instead. In addition, many of the surfaces on the south wall also contained a patina of manganese oxide, inferring that the area was exposed over a few hundred years. Following collapses do not cause the sinkhole to become deeper, instead widening it.

The walls on the upper area of the sinkhole are made out of sandstone from the Schnebly Hill Formation, while the lower areas are made from shaly siltstone of the Hermit Formation.

== History ==
The initial collapse occurred in the early 1880s. The first person to view the new landform was Jim James. A second collapse happened in late 1989, opening the cave by around forty percent in the northern section. The United States Forest Service conducted a geologic study of the sinkhole in 1990 to prevent visitors from falling victim to a spontaneous sinkhole formation.
