= Cennet and Cehennem =

Two sinkholes in Mersin Province; Turkey

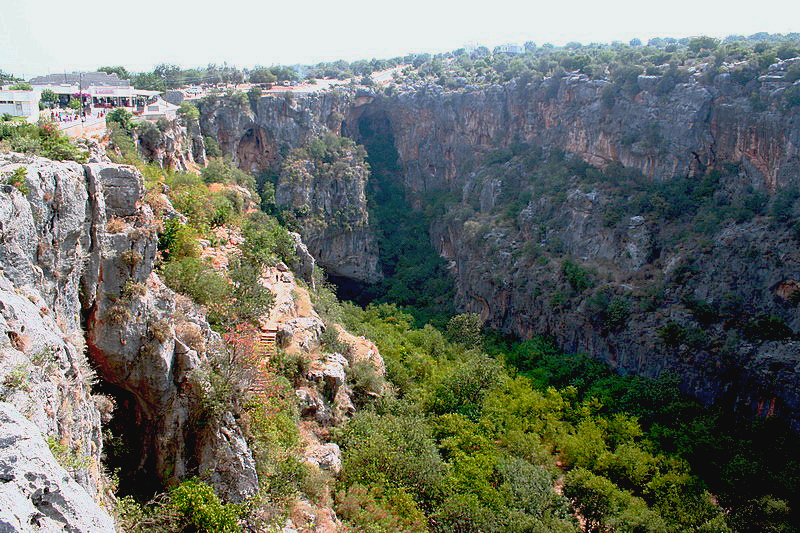
Cennet

Cennet and Cehennem (heaven and hell in Turkish) are the names of two large sinkholes in the Taurus Mountains, in Mersin Province, Turkey. The sinkholes are among the tourist attractions of the province.

== Geography ==
Cennet and Cehennem are situated next to each other. Cennet is situated at 36°27′09″N 34°6′20″E and Cehennem is at 36°27′16″N 34°6′21″E. Both of them are in the rural area of the Silifke district which in turn is a part of Mersin Province. They are accessible by a 2 kilometres (1.2 mi) long all season open road from the main highway (D 400). The highway distances are 22 kilometres (14 mi) to Silifke and 67 kilometres (42 mi) to Mersin. They are close to the coastal town of Narlıkuyu.

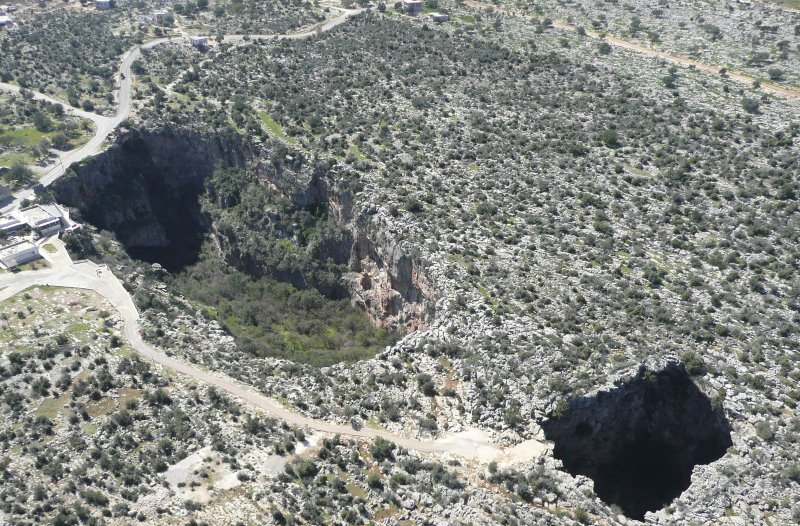
Aerial view of the two sinkholes next to each other

== Cennet ==
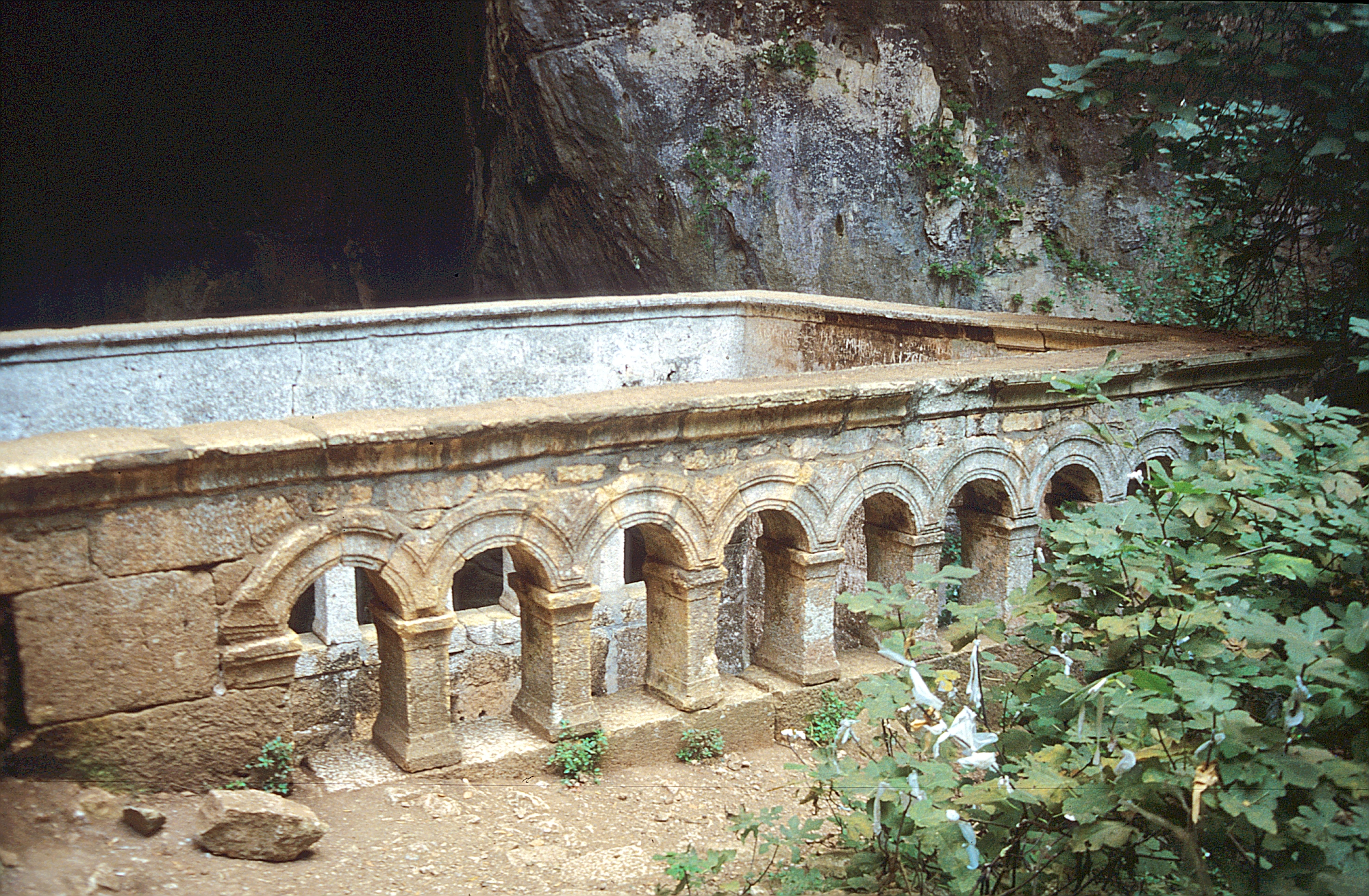
The monastery

The opening of Cennet is 250 × 110 m^{2} (820 × 360 ft^{2}) and its average depth is 70 metres (230 ft). It is possible to reach the bottom of Cennet by a primitive staircase composed of 300 steps. In 2020, an elevator was also established. At the bottom toward the south, there is a smaller and 150-step deeper cave. In this cave are the ruins of a monastery built in the 5th century by a certain Paulus and dedicated to the Virgin Mary. In this monastery one can hear the sound of a small underground stream which flows from the monastery to the gulf of Narlıkuyu.

== Cehennem ==
Cehennem is a deeper sinkhole with a depth of 128 metres (420 ft). But its top opening is smaller with dimensions 70 × 50 m^{2} ( 210 × 150 ft^{2} ). As the upper edge of the opening is concave there is no access to the bottom of Cehennem.

== Mythology ==
In mythology, Zeus kept Typhon temporarily in Cehennem before imprisoning him under Mount Etna.

== See also ==
- List of sinkholes of Turkey
