= Sinkhole =

Geologically-formed topological depression

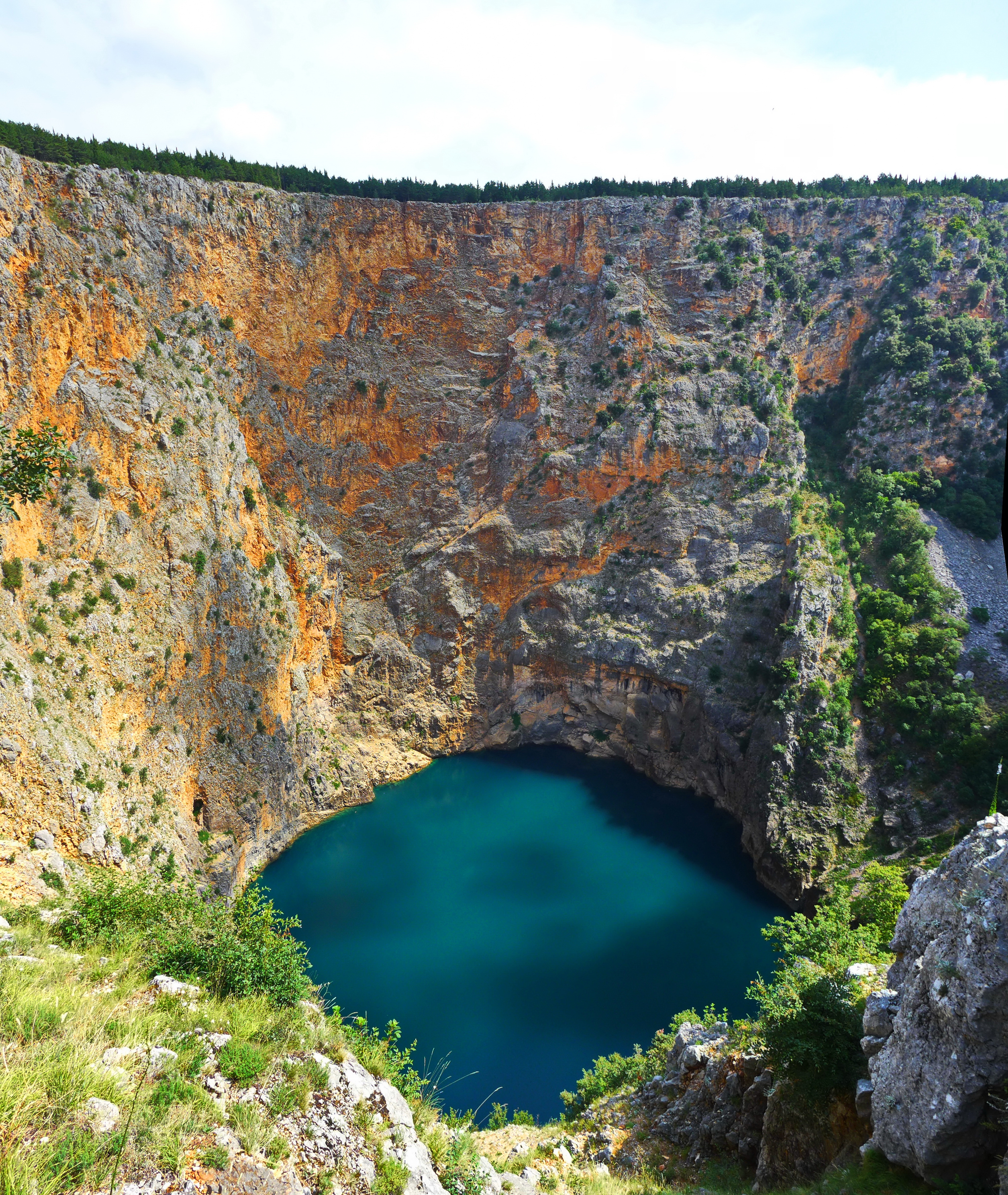
The Red Lake sinkhole in Croatia

A sinkhole is a depression or hole in the ground caused by some form of collapse of the surface layer. The term is sometimes used to refer to doline, enclosed depressions that are also known as shakeholes, and to openings where surface water enters into underground passages known as ponor, swallow hole or swallet. A cenote is a type of sinkhole that exposes groundwater underneath. Sink and stream sink are more general terms for sites which drain surface water, possibly by infiltration into sediment or crumbled rock.

Most sinkholes are caused by karst processes – the chemical dissolution of carbonate rocks, collapse or suffosion processes. Sinkholes are usually circular and vary in size from tens to hundreds of meters both in diameter and depth, and vary in form from soil-lined bowls to bedrock-edged chasms. Sinkholes may form gradually or suddenly, and are found worldwide.

== Formation ==
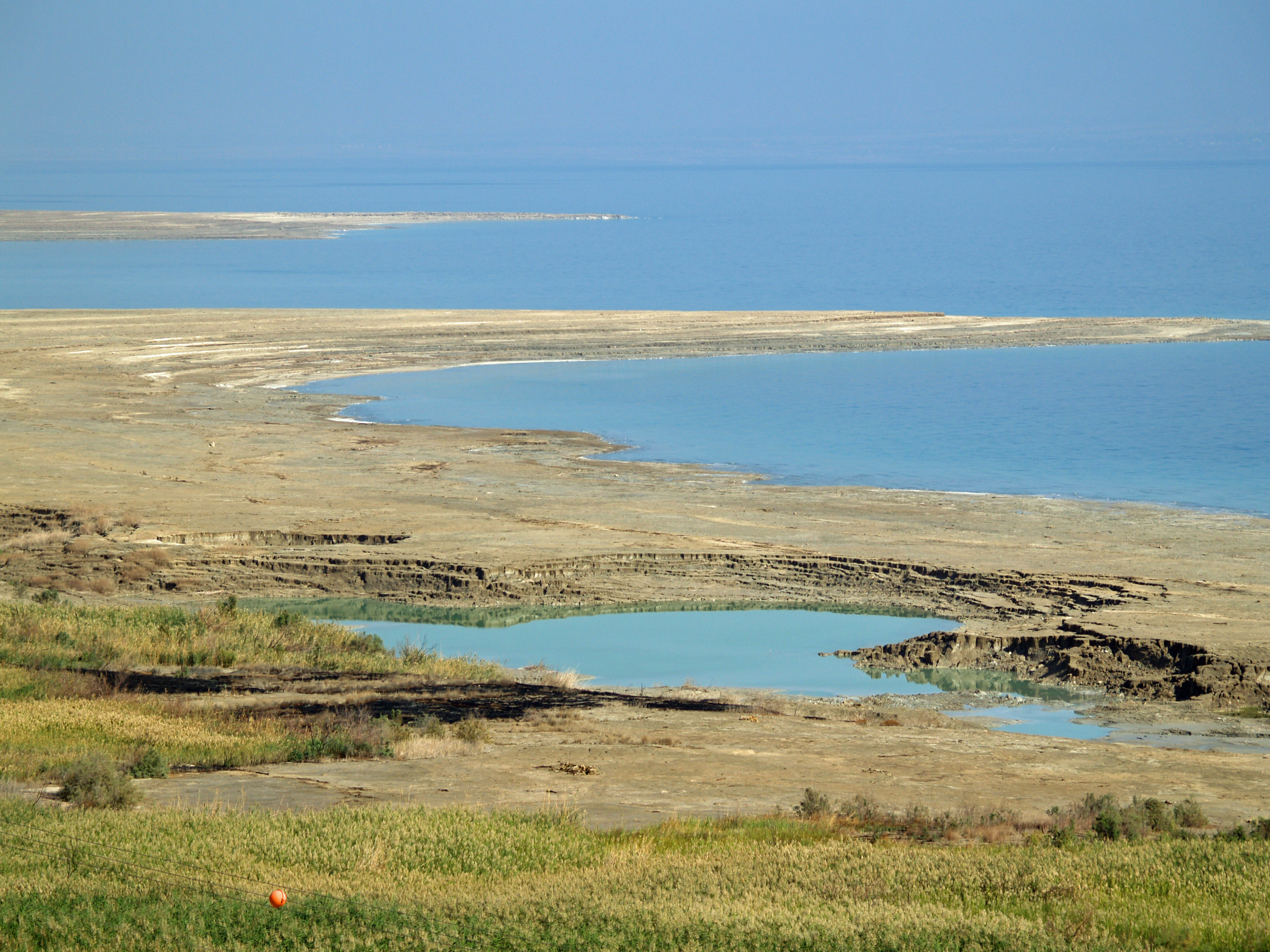
Sinkholes near the Dead Sea, formed when underground salt is dissolved by freshwater intrusion, due to continuing sea-level drop.

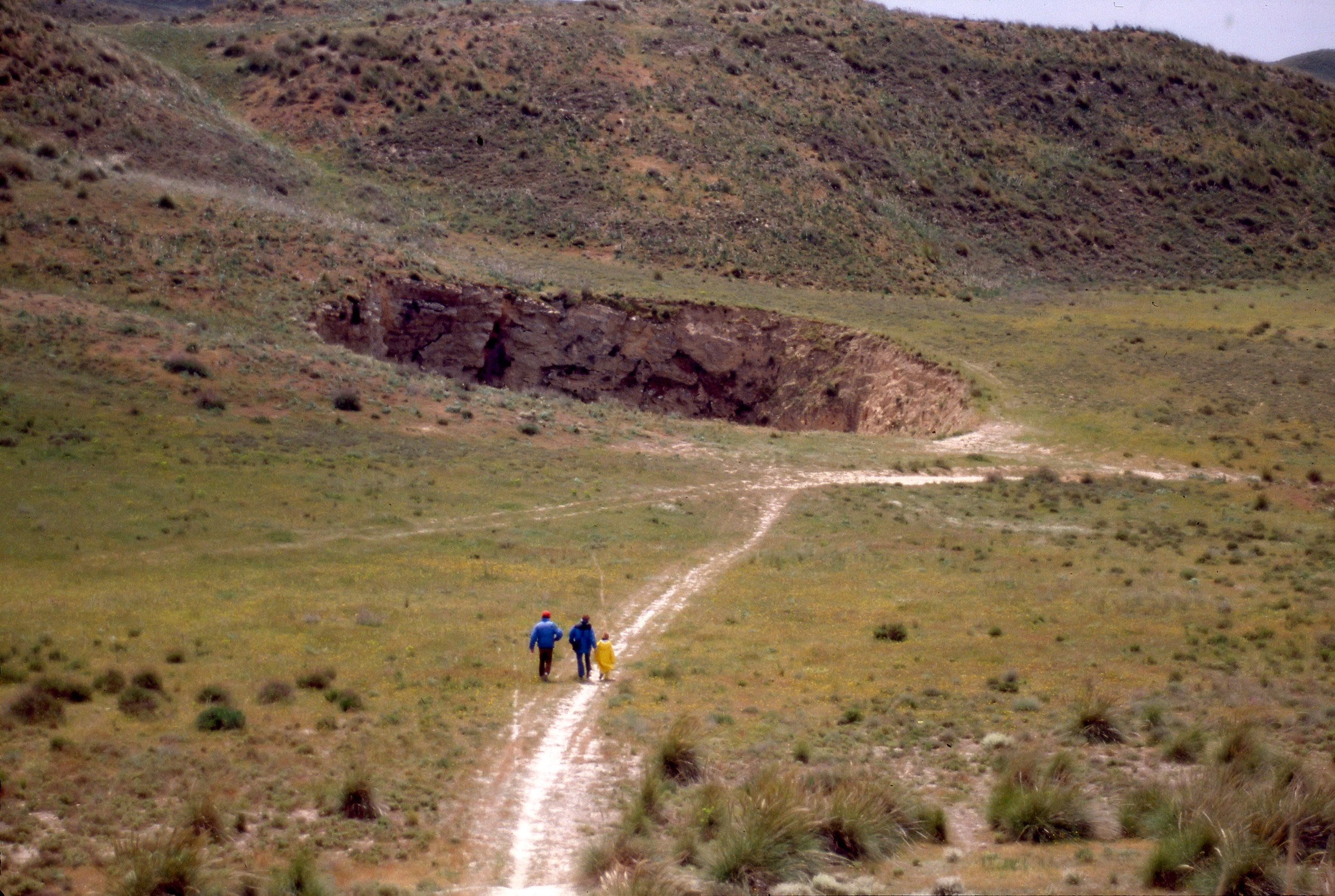
Collapse sinkhole in Chinchón, Spain.

=== Natural processes ===
Sinkholes may capture surface drainage from running or standing water, but may also form in high and dry places in specific locations. Sinkholes that capture drainage can hold it in large limestone caves. These caves may drain into tributaries of larger rivers.

The formation of sinkholes involves natural processes of erosion or gradual removal of slightly soluble bedrock (such as limestone) by percolating water, the collapse of a cave roof, or a lowering of the water table. Sinkholes often form through the process of suffosion. For example, groundwater may dissolve the carbonate cement holding the sandstone particles together and then carry away the lax particles, gradually forming a void.

Occasionally a sinkhole may exhibit a visible opening into a cave below. In the case of exceptionally large sinkholes, such as the Minyé sinkhole in Papua New Guinea or Cedar Sink at Mammoth Cave National Park in Kentucky, an underground stream or river may be visible across its bottom flowing from one side to the other.

Sinkholes are common where the rock below the land surface is limestone or other carbonate rock, salt beds, or in other soluble rocks, such as gypsum, that can be dissolved naturally by circulating ground water. Sinkholes also occur in sandstone and quartzite terrains.

As the rock dissolves, spaces and caverns develop underground. These sinkholes can be dramatic, because the surface land usually stays intact until there is not enough support. Then, a sudden collapse of the land surface can occur.

=== Space and planetary bodies ===
On 2 July 2015, scientists reported that active pits, related to sinkhole collapses and possibly associated with outbursts, were found on the comet 67P/Churyumov-Gerasimenko by the Rosetta space probe.

=== Artificial processes ===
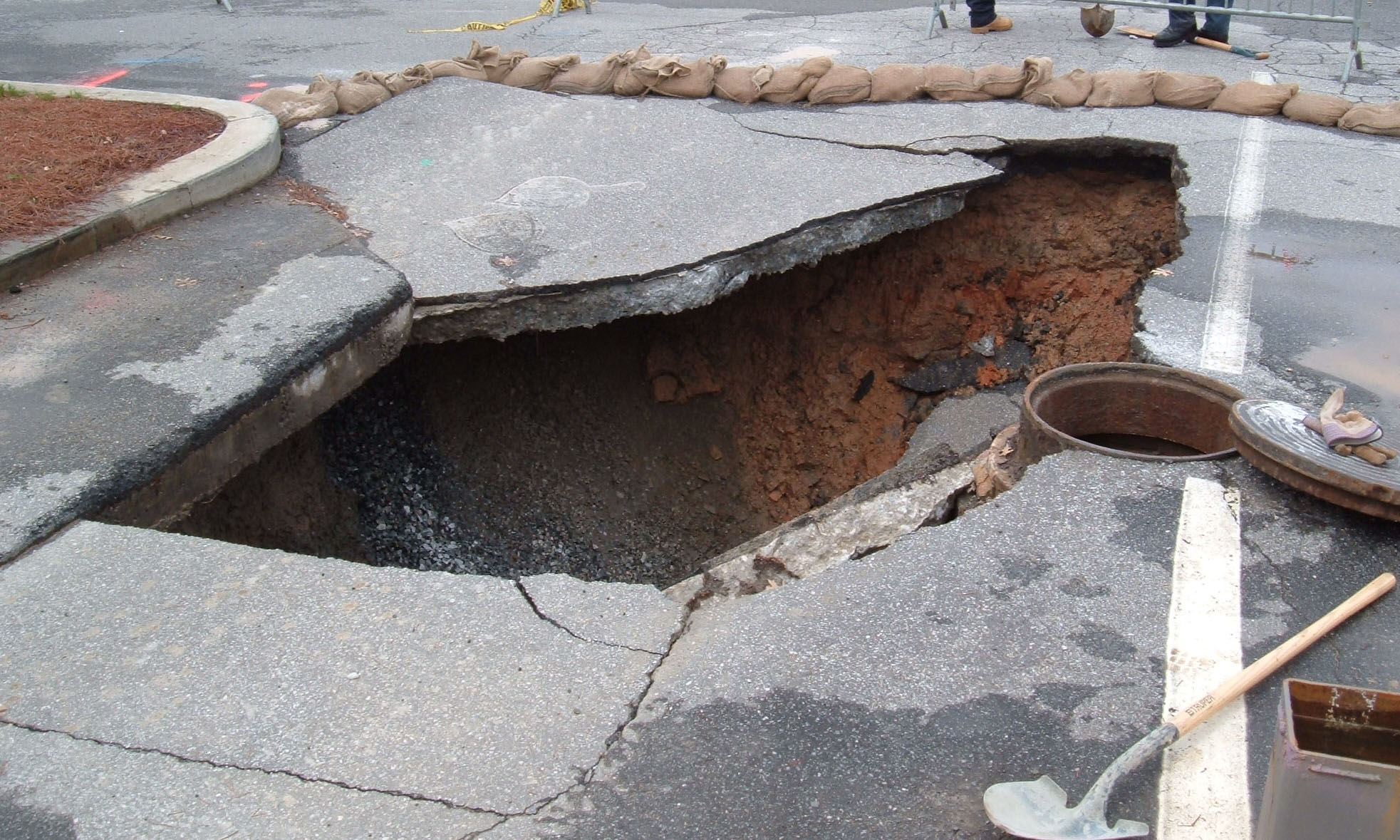
A 32-foot-deep (9.8-meter) collapse formed by rainwater leaking through pavement and carrying soil into a ruptured sewer pipe in the parking lot at Georgia Tech in Atlanta, Georgia in 2005

Collapses, commonly incorrectly labeled as sinkholes, also occur due to human activity, such as the collapse of abandoned mines and salt cavern storage in salt domes in places like Louisiana, Mississippi, and Texas, in the United States. More commonly, collapses occur in urban areas due to water main breaks or sewer collapses when old pipes give way. They can also occur from the overpumping and extraction of groundwater and subsurface fluids.

Sinkholes can also form when natural water drainage patterns are changed and new water diversion systems are developed. Some sinkholes form when the land surface is changed, such as when industrial and runoff storage ponds are created; the substantial weight of the new material can trigger a collapse of the roof of an existing void or cavity in the subsurface, resulting in development of a sinkhole.

== Classification ==
=== Solution sinkholes ===
Solution or dissolution sinkholes form where water dissolves limestone under a soil covering. Dissolution enlarges natural openings in the rock such as joints, fractures, and bedding planes. Soil settles down into the enlarged openings forming a small depression at the ground surface.

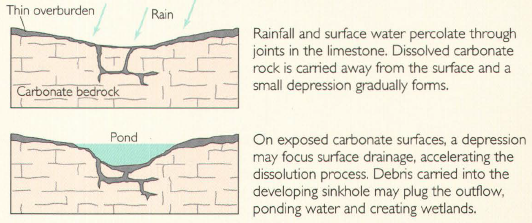
Rainfall and surface water percolate through joints in the limestone. Dissolved carbonate rock is carried away from the surface, and a small depression gradually forms. On exposed carbonate surfaces, a depression may focus surface drainage, accelerating the dissolution process. Debris carried into the developing sinkhole may plug the outflow, ponding water and creating wetlands.

=== Cover-subsidence sinkholes ===
Cover-subsidence sinkholes form where voids in the underlying limestone allow more settling of the soil to create larger surface depressions.

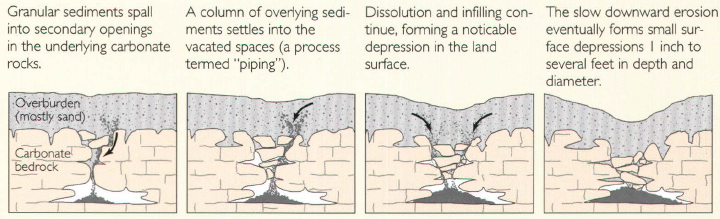
Granular sediments spall into secondary openings in the underlying carbonate rocks. A column of overlying sediments settles into the vacated spaces (a process termed "piping"). Dissolution and infilling continue, forming a noticeable depression in the land surface. The slow downward erosion eventually forms small surface depressions 1 inch to several feet in depth and diameter.

=== Cover-collapse sinkholes ===
Cover-collapse sinkholes or "dropouts" form where so much soil settles down into voids in the limestone that the ground surface collapses. The surface collapses may occur abruptly and cause catastrophic damages. New sinkhole collapses can also form when human activity changes the natural water-drainage patterns in karst areas.

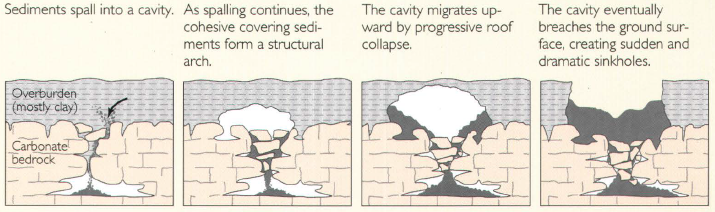
Sediments spall into a cavity. As spalling continues, the cohesive covering sediments form a structural arch. The cavity migrates upward by progressive roof collapse. The cavity eventually breaches the ground surface, creating sudden and dramatic sinkholes.

=== Pseudokarst sinkholes ===
Pseudokarst sinkholes resemble karst sinkholes but are formed by processes other than the natural dissolution of rock.

== Human-accelerated sinkholes ==
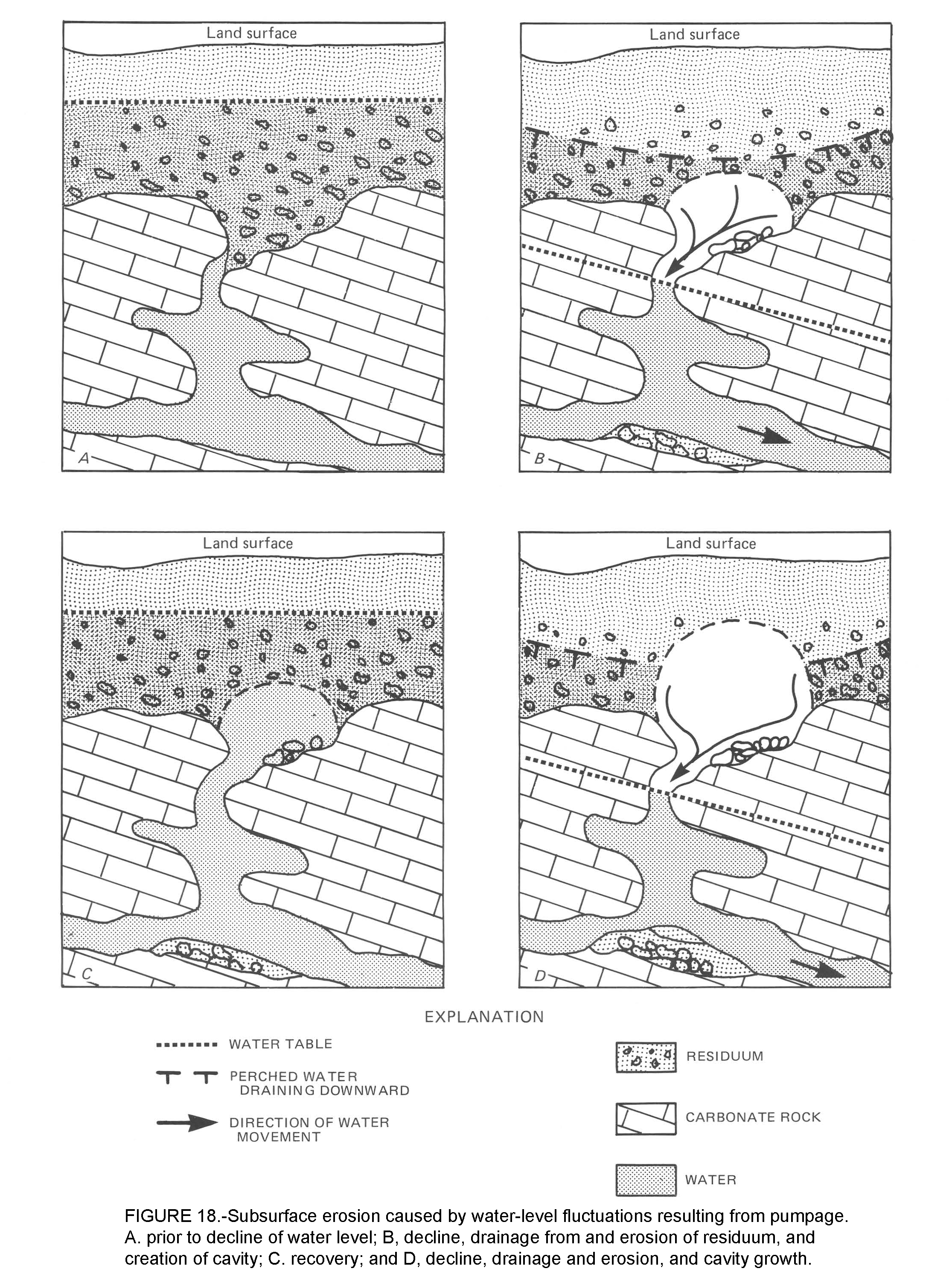
Man-made activities and land alterations that cause water-level fluctuations accelerate cover-collapse sinkholes

Human activities can accelerate collapses of karst sinkholes, causing collapse within a few years that would normally evolve over thousands of years under natural conditions. Soil-collapse sinkholes, which are characterized by the collapse of cavities in soil that have developed where soil falls down into underlying rock cavities, pose the most serious hazards to life and property. Fluctuation of the water level accelerates this collapse process. When water rises up through fissures in the rock, it reduces soil cohesion. Later, as the water level moves downward, the softened soil seeps downwards into rock cavities. Flowing water in karst conduits carries the soil away, preventing soil from accumulating in rock cavities and allowing the collapse process to continue.

Induced sinkholes occur where human activity alters how surface water recharges groundwater. Many human-induced sinkholes occur where natural diffused recharge is disturbed and surface water becomes concentrated. Activities that can accelerate sinkhole collapses include timber removal, ditching, laying pipelines, sewers, water lines, storm drains, and drilling. These activities can increase the downward movement of water beyond the natural rate of groundwater recharge. The increased runoff from the impervious surfaces of roads, roofs, and parking lots also accelerate man-induced sinkhole collapses.

Some induced sinkholes are preceded by warning signs, such as cracks, sagging, jammed doors, or cracking noises, but others develop with little or no warning. However, karst development is well understood, and proper site characterization can avoid karst disasters. Thus most sinkhole disasters are predictable and preventable rather than "acts of God". The American Society of Civil Engineers has declared that the potential for sinkhole collapse must be a part of land-use planning in karst areas. Where sinkhole collapse of structures could cause loss of life, the public should be made aware of the risks.

The most likely locations for sinkhole collapse are areas where there is already a high density of existing sinkholes. Their presence shows that the subsurface contains a cave system or other unstable voids. Where large cavities exist in the limestone large surface collapses can occur, such the Winter Park, Florida sinkhole collapse. Recommendations for land uses in karst areas should avoid or minimize alterations of the land surface and natural drainage.

Since water level changes accelerate sinkhole collapse, measures must be taken to minimize water level changes. The areas most susceptible to sinkhole collapse can be identified and avoided. In karst areas the traditional foundation evaluations (bearing capacity and settlement) of the ability of soil to support a structure must be supplemented by geotechnical site investigation for cavities and defects in the underlying rock. Since the soil/rock surface in karst areas are very irregular the number of subsurface samples (borings and core samples) required per unit area is usually much greater than in non-karst areas.

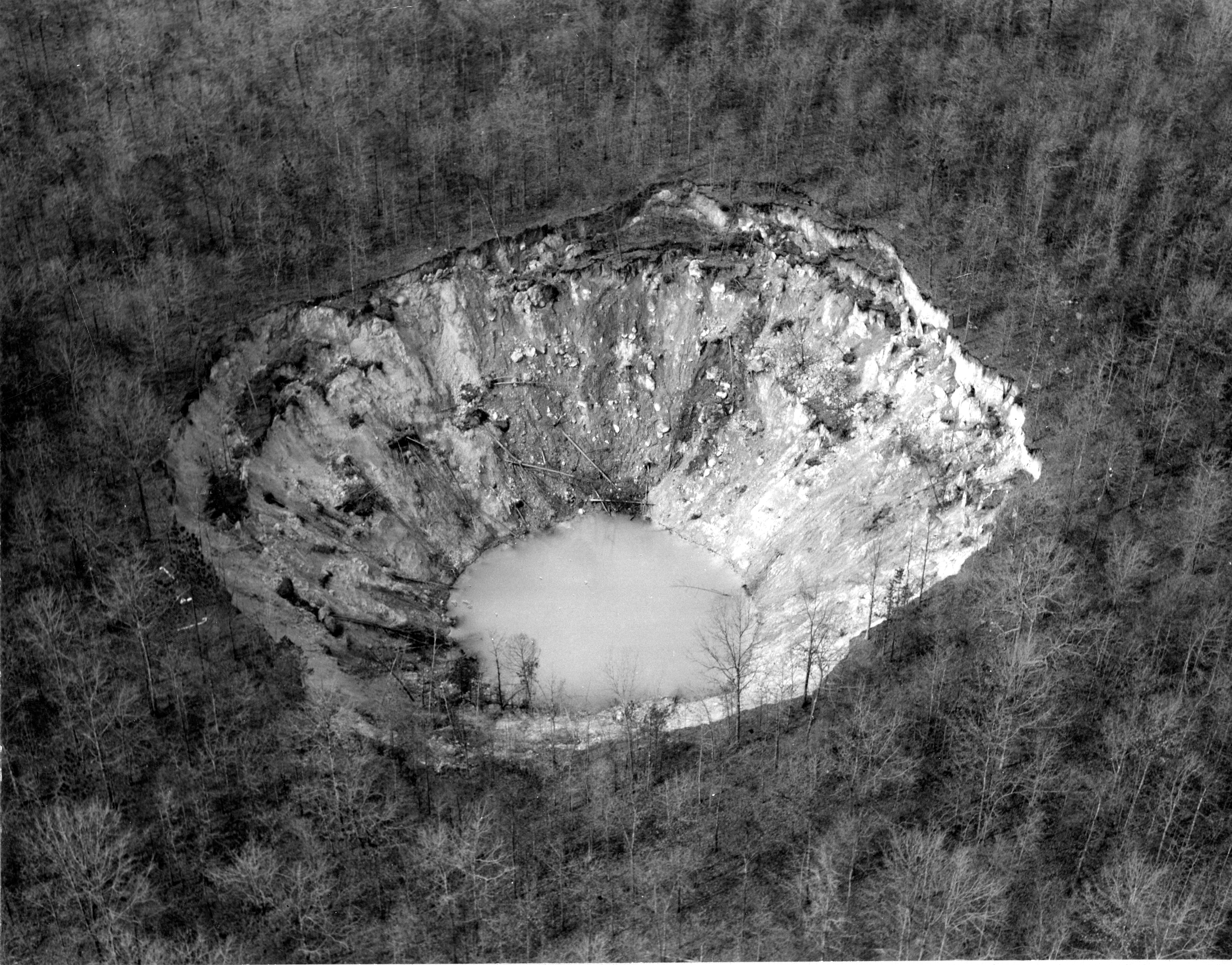
More than three acres of forest suddenly disappeared into this "December Giant" sinkhole in Montevallo, Alabama.

In 2015, the U.S. Geological Survey estimated the cost for repairs of damage arising from karst-related processes as at least $300 million per year over the preceding 15 years, but noted that this may be a gross underestimate based on inadequate data. The greatest amount of karst sinkhole damage in the United States occurs in Florida, Texas, Alabama, Missouri, Kentucky, Tennessee, and Pennsylvania. The largest recent sinkhole in the USA is possibly one that formed in 1972 in Montevallo, Alabama, as a result of man-made lowering of the water level in a nearby rock quarry. This "December Giant" or "Golly Hole" sinkhole measures 130 m (425 ft) long, 105 m (350 ft) wide and 45 m (150 ft) deep.

Other areas of significant karst hazards include the Ebro Basin in northern Spain; the island of Sardinia; the Italian peninsula; the Chalk areas in southern England; Sichuan, China; Jamaica; France; Croatia; Bosnia and Herzegovina; Slovenia; and Russia, where one-third of the total land area is underlain by karst.

== Occurrence ==
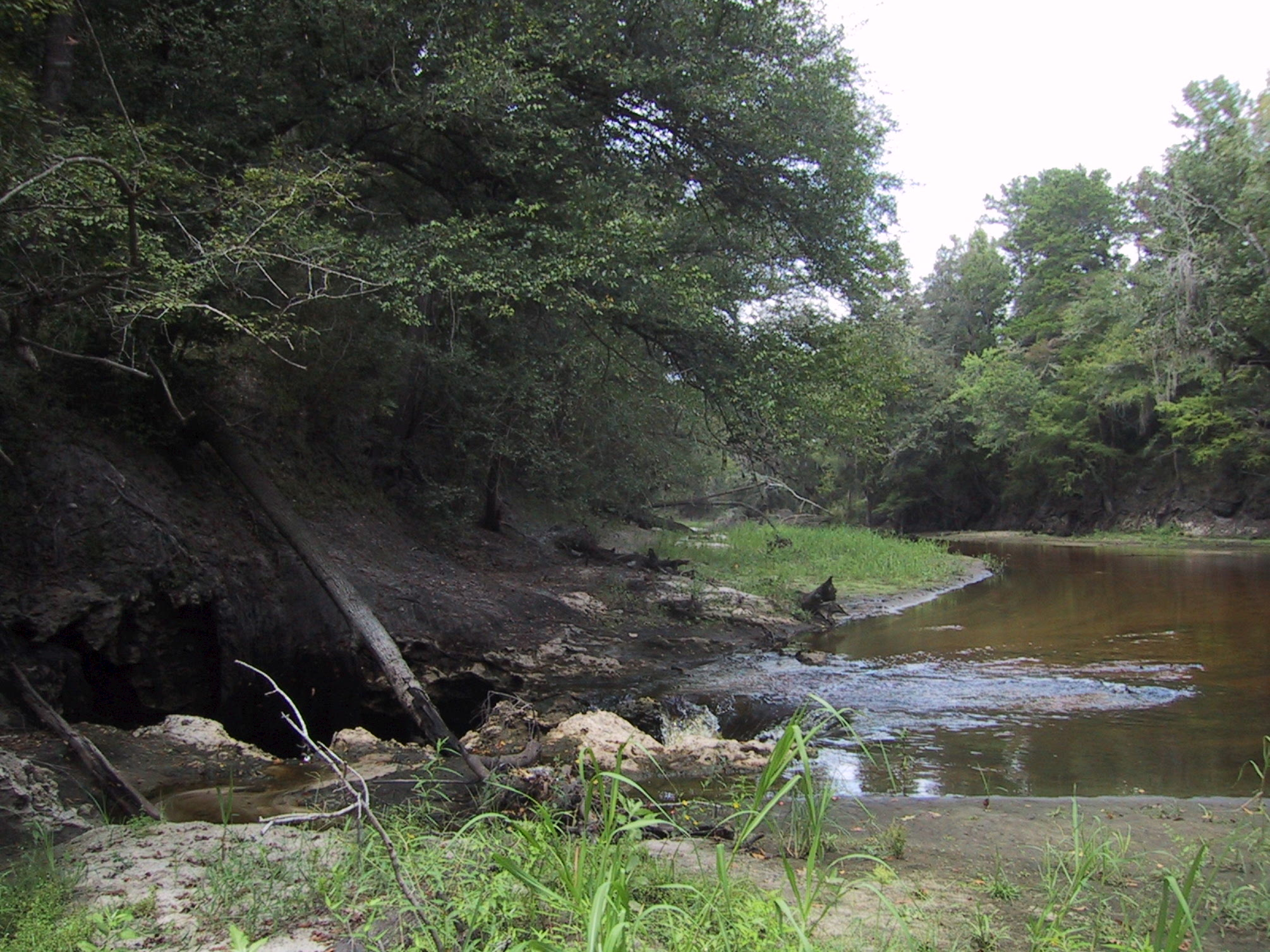
The entire surface water flow of the Alapaha River near Jennings, Florida goes into a sinkhole leading to the Floridan Aquifer groundwater

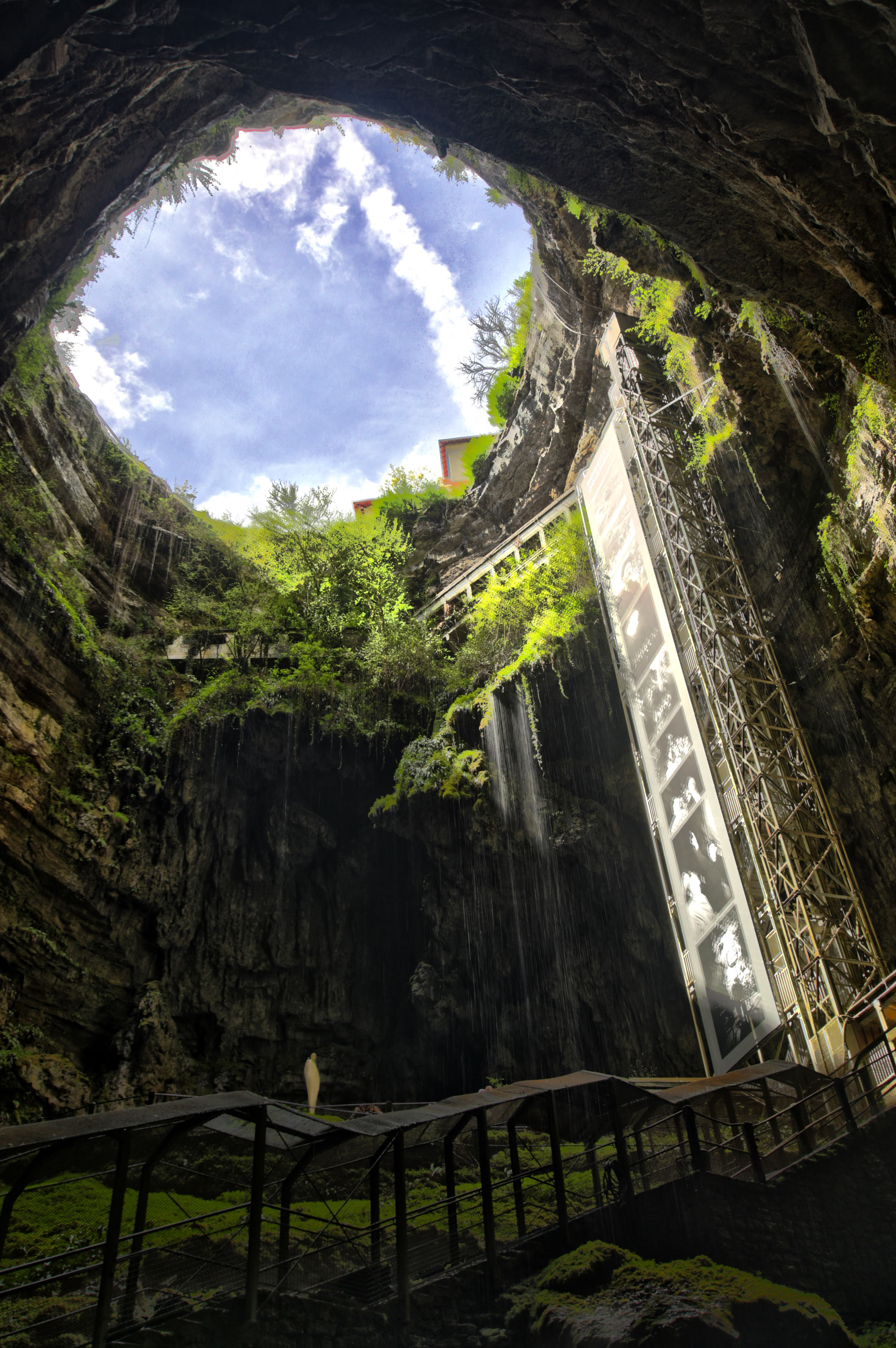
Gouffre de Padirac in France known since the 3rd century and explored in 1889

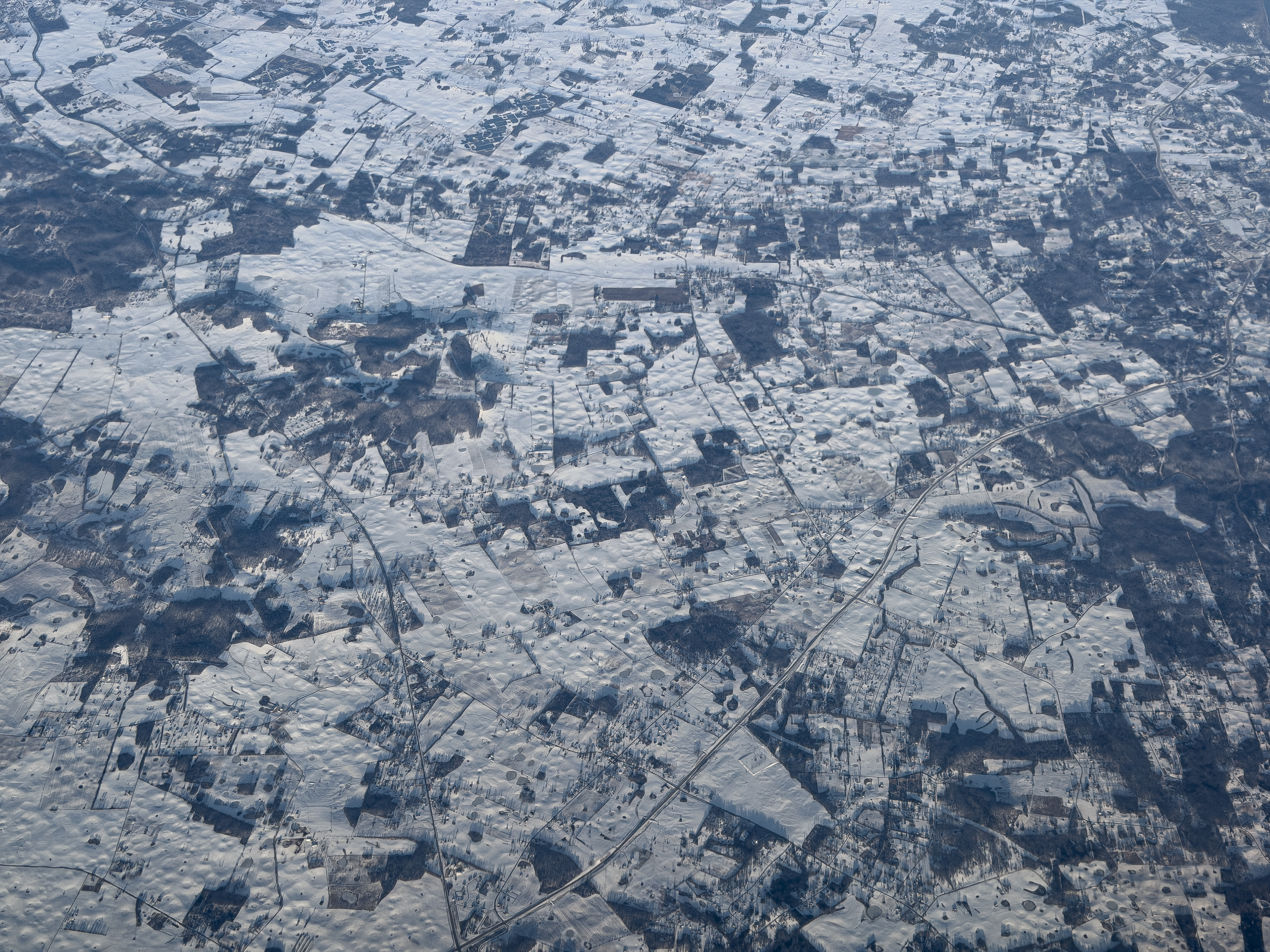
Various depressions and sinkholes visible from the air in Meade County, Kentucky

Sinkholes tend to occur in karst landscapes. Karst landscapes can have up to thousands of sinkholes within a small area, giving the landscape a pock-marked appearance. These sinkholes drain all the water, so there are only subterranean rivers in these areas. Examples of karst landscapes with numerous massive sinkholes include Khammouan Mountains (Laos) and Mamo Plateau (Papua New Guinea). The largest known sinkholes formed in sandstone are Sima Humboldt and Sima Martel in Venezuela.

Some sinkholes form in thick layers of homogeneous limestone. Their formation is facilitated by high groundwater flow, often caused by high rainfall; such rainfall causes formation of the giant sinkholes in the Nakanaï Mountains, on the New Britain island in Papua New Guinea. Powerful underground rivers may form on the contact between limestone and underlying insoluble rock, creating large underground voids.

In such conditions, the largest known sinkholes of the world have formed, like the 662-metre-deep (2,172 ft) Xiaozhai Tiankeng (Chongqing, China), giant sótanos in Querétaro and San Luis Potosí states in Mexico and others.

Unusual processes have formed the enormous sinkholes of Sistema Zacatón in Tamaulipas (Mexico), where more than 20 sinkholes and other karst formations have been shaped by volcanically heated, acidic groundwater. This has produced not only the formation of the deepest water-filled sinkhole in the world—Zacatón—but also unique processes of travertine sedimentation in upper parts of sinkholes, leading to sealing of these sinkholes with travertine lids.

The U.S. state of Florida in North America is known for having frequent sinkhole collapses, especially in the central part of the state. Underlying limestone there is from 15 to 25 million years old. On the fringes of the state, sinkholes are rare or non-existent; limestone there is around 120,000 years old.

The Murge area in southern Italy also has numerous sinkholes. Sinkholes can be formed in retention ponds from large amounts of rain.

On the Arctic seafloor, methane emissions have caused large sinkholes to form.

== Human uses ==
Sinkholes have been used for centuries as disposal sites for various forms of waste. A consequence of this is the pollution of groundwater resources, with serious health implications in such areas.

The Maya civilization sometimes used sinkholes in the Yucatán Peninsula (known as cenotes) as places to deposit precious items and human sacrifices.

When sinkholes are very deep or connected to caves, they may offer challenges for experienced cavers or, when water-filled, divers. Some of the most spectacular are the Zacatón cenote in Mexico (the world's deepest water-filled sinkhole), the Boesmansgat sinkhole in South Africa, Sarisariñama tepuy in Venezuela, the Sótano del Barro in Mexico, and in the town of Mount Gambier, South Australia. Sinkholes that form in coral reefs and islands that collapse to enormous depths are known as blue holes and often become popular diving spots.

== Local names ==
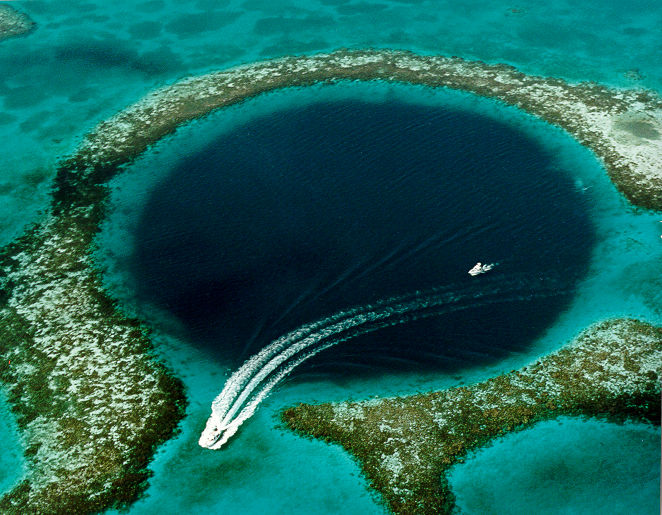
The Great Blue Hole near Ambergris Caye, Belize

Large and visually unusual sinkholes have been well known to local people since ancient times. Nowadays sinkholes are grouped and named in site-specific or generic names. Some examples of such names are listed below.

- Aven – In the south of France (this name means pit cave in the Occitan language).
- Black holes (not to be confused with cosmic black holes) – This term refers to a group of unique, round, water-filled pits in the Bahamas. These formations seem to be dissolved in carbonate mud from above, by the sea water. The dark color of the water is caused by a layer of phototropic microorganisms concentrated in a dense, purple colored layer at 15 to 20 m (49 to 66 ft) depth; this layer "swallows" the light. Metabolism in the layer of microorganisms causes heating of the water. One of them is the Black Hole of Andros.
- Blue holes – This name was initially given to the deep underwater sinkholes of the Bahamas but is often used for any deep water-filled pits formed in carbonate rocks. The name originates from the deep blue color of water in these sinkholes, which is created by the high clarity of the water and the great depth of the sinkholes; only the deep blue color of the visible spectrum can penetrate such depth and return after reflection.
- Cenote – This refers to the characteristic water-filled sinkholes in the Yucatán Peninsula, Belize and some other regions. Some of the cenotes are developed above the rim of the Chicxulub crater and helped to identify its presence.
- Dolina – Slovenian toponym internationally used for karst sinkholes. The original meaning is "valley" or "dale".
- Foiba – Friulan Italian dialect word (from the Latin fŏvea: "pit" or "chasm"). The name is given to sinkholes in the frontier zone between the Italian region of Friuli-Venezia Giulia, Croatia and Slovenia, in the Karst Plateau.
- Sótanos – This name is given to several giant pits in several states of Mexico.
- Tiankengs – These are extremely large sinkholes, typically deeper and wider than 250 m (820 ft), with mostly vertical walls, most often created by the collapse of caverns. The term means sky holes in Chinese; many of this largest type of sinkhole are located in China.
- Tomo – This term is used in New Zealand karst country to describe sinkholes.
- Vrtača, ponikva, dolac, dô – Croatian terms for sinkhole.

== Piping pseudokarst ==
The 2010 Guatemala City sinkhole formed suddenly in May of that year; torrential rains from Tropical Storm Agatha and a bad drainage system were blamed for its creation. It swallowed a three-story building and a house; it measured approximately 20 m (66 ft) wide and 30 m (98 ft) deep. A similar hole had formed nearby in February 2007.

This large vertical hole is not a true sinkhole, as it did not form via the dissolution of limestone, dolomite, marble, or any other water-soluble rock. Instead, they are examples of "piping pseudokarst", created by the collapse of large cavities that had developed in the weak, crumbly Quaternary volcanic deposits underlying the city. Although weak and crumbly, these volcanic deposits have enough cohesion to allow them to stand in vertical faces and to develop large subterranean voids within them. A process called "soil piping" first created large underground voids, as water from leaking water mains flowed through these volcanic deposits and mechanically washed fine volcanic materials out of them, then progressively eroded and removed coarser materials. Eventually, these underground voids became large enough that their roofs collapsed to create large holes.

== Crown hole ==
A crown hole is subsidence due to subterranean human activity, such as mining and military trenches. Examples have included, instances above World War I trenches in Ypres, Belgium; near mines in Nitra, Slovakia; a limestone quarry in Dudley, England; and above an old gypsum mine in Magheracloone, Ireland.

== Notable examples ==
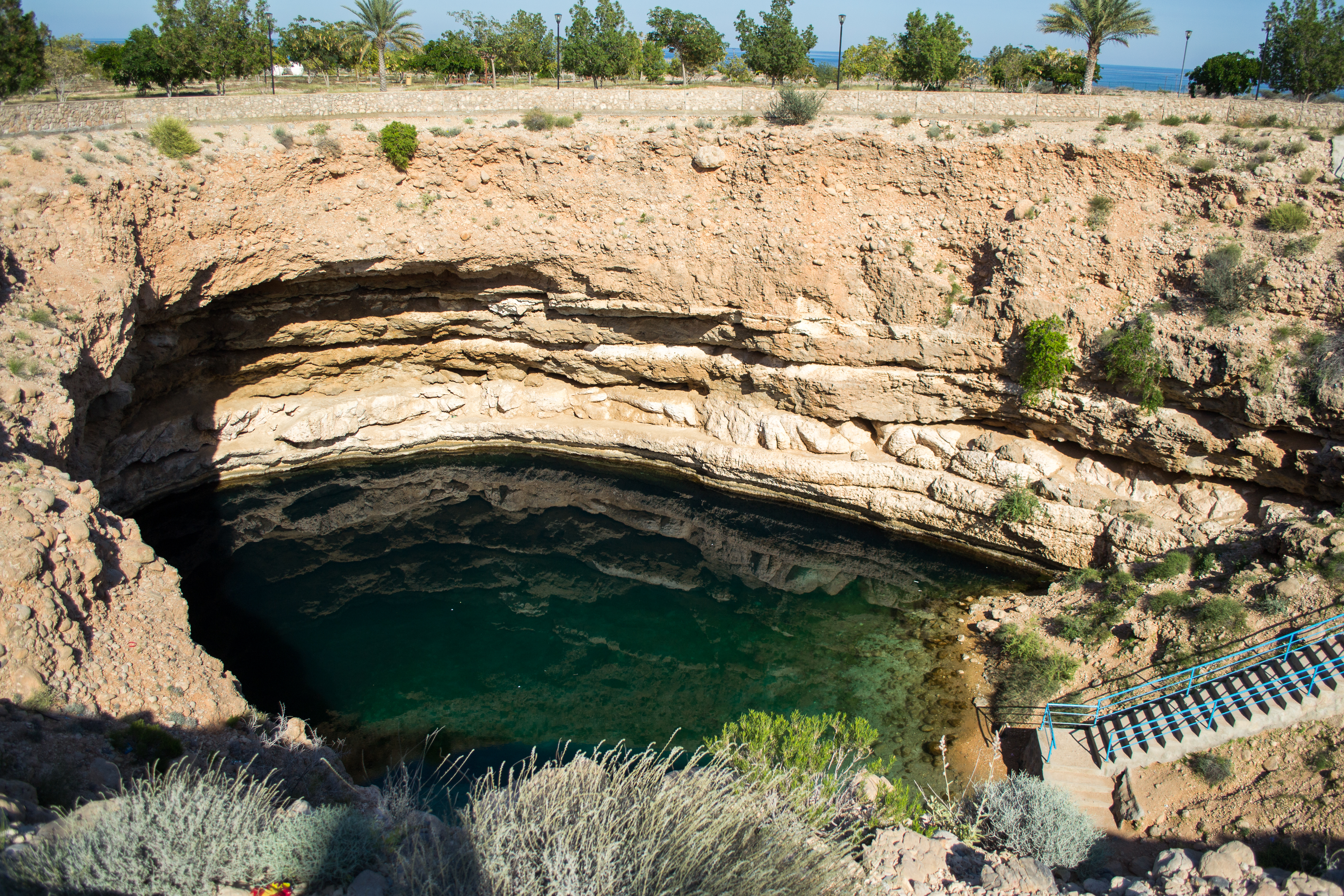
Bimmah or Falling Star Sinkhole in Oman

Some of the largest sinkholes in the world are:

=== Africa ===
- Boesmansgat – South African freshwater sinkhole, approximately 290 m (950 ft) deep.
- Lake Kashiba – Zambia. About 3.5 hectares (8.6 acres) in area and about 100 m (330 ft) deep.
- Blue Hole – Dahab, Egypt. A round sinkhole or blue hole, 130 m (430 ft) deep. It includes an archway leading out to the Red Sea at 60 m (200 ft), which has been the site for many freediving and scuba attempts, the latter often fatal.

=== Asia ===
- Akhayat sinkhole is in Mersin Province, Turkey. Its dimensions are about 150 m (490 ft) in diameter with a maximum depth of 70 m (230 ft).
- Well of Barhout – A 112-metre (367 ft) deep pit cave in Al-Mahara, Yemen.
- Bimmah Sinkhole (Hawiyat Najm, the Falling Star Sinkhole, Dibab Sinkhole) – Oman, approximately 30 m (98 ft) deep.
- Teiq Sinkhole (Taiq, Teeq, Tayq) in Oman is one of the largest sinkholes in the world by volume: 90,000,000 m^{3} (3.2×10^{9} ft^{3}). Several perennial wadis fall with spectacular waterfalls into this 250 m (820 ft) deep sinkhole.
- The Baatara gorge sinkhole and the Baatara gorge waterfall next to Tannourine in Lebanon
- Dashiwei Tiankeng in Guangxi, China, is 613 m (2,011 ft) deep, with vertical walls. At the bottom is an isolated patch of forest with rare species.
- Shaanxi tiankeng cluster, in the Daba Mountains of southern Shaanxi, China, covers an area of nearly 5019 square kilometers with the largest sinkhole being 520 meters in diameter and 320 meters deep.
- Xiaozhai Tiankeng – Chongqing, China. Double nested sinkhole with vertical walls, 662 m (2,172 ft) deep.
- The Dragon Hole, located south of the Paracel Islands, was the deepest known underwater ocean sinkhole in the world until it was discovered in 2024 that the Taam Ja' Blue Hole was deeper. The Dragon Hole is 300.89 m (987.2 ft) deep.

=== Caribbean ===
- Dean's Blue Hole – Bahamas. The second deepest known sinkhole under the sea, depth 203 m (666 ft). Popular location for world championships of free diving, as well as recreational diving.

=== Central America ===
- Great Blue Hole – Belize. Spectacular, round sinkhole, 124 m (407 ft) deep. Unusual features are tilted stalactites in great depth, which mark the former orientation of limestone layers when this sinkhole was above sea level.
- 2007 Guatemala City sinkhole
- 2010 Guatemala City sinkhole
- Taam Ja' Blue Hole, the deepest known blue hole worldwide

=== Europe ===
- Hranice Abyss, in the Moravia region of the Czech Republic, is the deepest known underwater cave in the world. The lowest confirmed depth (as of 27 September 2016) is 473 m (404 m below the water level).
- Maqluba, in Malta is a sinkhole with a surface area of around 4,765 square metres (51,290 sq ft) situated in the village of Qrendi in Malta. The diameter is around 50m, the depth is around 15m, and the perimeter 300m.
- Pozzo del Merro, near Rome, Italy. At the bottom of an 80 m (260 ft) conical pit, and approximately 400 m (1,300 ft) deep, it is among the deepest sinkholes in the world (see Sótano del Barro below).
- Red Lake – Croatia. Approximately 530 m (1,740 ft) deep pit with nearly vertical walls, contains an approximately 280–290 m (920–950 ft) deep lake.
- Gouffre de Padirac – France. It is 103 m (338 ft) deep, with a diameter of 33 metres (108 feet). Visitors descend 75 m via a lift or a staircase to a lake allowing a boat tour after entering into the cave system which contains a 55 km subterranean river.
- Vouliagmeni – Greece. The sinkhole of Vouliagmeni is known as "The Devil Well", because it is considered extremely dangerous. Four scuba divers have died in it. Maximum depth of 35.2 m (115 ft 6 in) and horizontal penetration of 150 m (490 ft).
- Pouldergaderry – Ireland. This sinkhole is located in the townland of Kilderry South near Milltown, County Kerry at 52°7′57.5″N 9°44′45.4″W. The sinkhole, which is located in an area of karst bedrock, is approximately 80 metres (260 ft) in diameter and 30 metres (98 ft) deep with many mature trees growing on the floor of the hole. At the level of the surrounding ground, the sinkhole covers an area of approximately 1.3 acres. Its presence is indicated on Ordnance Survey maps dating back to 1829.

=== North America ===
==== Canada ====
- Devil's Bath - Vancouver Island. 44 m (144 ft) deep.

==== Mexico ====
- Cave of Swallows – San Luis Potosí. 372 m (1,220 ft) deep, round sinkhole with overhanging walls.
- Puebla sinkhole – Santa Maria Zacatepec, Puebla. 120 m (400 ft) diameter and 15 m (50 ft) deep, it is still growing as of June 2021.
- Sima de las Cotorras – Chiapas. 160 m (520 ft) across, 140 m (460 ft) deep, with thousands of green parakeets and ancient rock paintings.
- Zacatón – Tamaulipas. Deepest water-filled sinkhole in world, 339 m (1,112 ft) deep.

==== United States ====
- Grassy Cove - Cumberland County, Tennessee. 13.6 km^{2} (5.3 sq mi) in area and 42.7 m (140 ft 1 in) deep, a National Natural Landmark.
- Golly Hole or December Giant - Calera, Alabama. Appeared 2 December 1972. Approximately 300 by 325 ft (91 by 99 m) and 35 m (120 ft) deep.
- Amberjack Hole – blue hole located 48 km (30 mi) off the coast of Sarasota, Florida.
- Green Banana Hole – a blue hole located 80 km (50 mi) off the coast of Sarasota, Florida.
- Kingsley Lake – Clay County, Florida. 8.1 km^{2} (2,000 acres) in area, 27 m (89 ft) deep and almost perfectly round.
- Winter Park Sinkhole – Winter Park, Florida. Appeared 8 May 1981. It was approximately 110 m (350 ft) wide and 25 m (75 ft) deep. It was notable as one of the largest recent sinkholes to form in the United States. It is now known as Lake Rose.
- Middle Island Sinkhole – Alpena Township, Michigan. Discovered in 2002, located at a short distance off the shore of Middle Island on Lake Huron. Approximately 20 m (70 ft) deep, 100 ft (30 m) wide.
- Devil's Millhopper – Gainesville, Florida. 35 m (120 ft) deep, 500 ft (150 m) wide. Twelve springs, some more visible than others, feed a pond at the bottom.
- Bayou Corne sinkhole – Assumption Parish, Louisiana. About 25 acres in area and 230 m (750 ft) deep.
- Lake Peigneur – New Iberia, Louisiana. Original depth 3.4 m (11 ft), currently 400 m (1,300 ft) at Diamond Crystal Salt Mine collapse.
- Daisetta Sinkholes – Daisetta, Texas. Several sinkholes have formed, the most recent in 2008 with a maximum diameter of 620 ft (190 m) and maximum depth of 45 m (150 ft).
- The Blue Hole – Santa Rosa, New Mexico. The surface entrance is only 80 feet (24 m) in diameter, it expands to a diameter of 130 feet (40 m) at the bottom.
- Gypsum Sinkhole – Utah, in Capitol Reef National Park. Nearly 15 m (49 ft) in diameter and approximately 60 m (200 ft) deep.

=== Oceania ===
- Harwoods Hole – Abel Tasman National Park, New Zealand. 183 m (600 ft) deep.

=== South America ===
- Sima Humboldt – Bolívar, Venezuela. Largest sinkhole in sandstone, 314 m (1,030 ft) deep, with vertical walls. Unique, isolated forest on bottom.
- In the western part of Cerro Duida, Venezuela, there is a complex of canyons with sinkholes. Deepest sinkhole is 450 m (1,480 ft) deep (from lowest rim within canyon); total depth 950 m (3,120 ft).

== See also ==
- Blyvooruitzicht
- Dolomite rock failure in South Africa
- Caldera – Cauldron-like volcanic feature formed by the emptying of a magma chamber
- Cennet and Cehennem – Two sinkholes in Mersin Province; Turkey
- Dersios sinkhole – Sinkhole in Arcadia, Greece
- Estavelle – Karst ground orifice which is sometimes a sink and other times a source
- Forau de Aigualluts – River in France
- Gully – Landform created by running water and/or mass movement eroding sharply into soil
- Lake-burst – Phenomenon in Irish mythology
- Oak Island – Island in Nova Scotia, Canada
- Pingo – Mound of earth-covered ice
- Pipe Creek Sinkhole – Paleontological site in Grant County, Indiana
- Turlough (lake) – Type of seasonal or periodic lake found in limestone areas of Ireland
