= Timeline of Guatemala City =

Coordinates: 14.613333°N 90.535278°W

The following is a timeline of the history of Guatemala City, Republic of Guatemala.

== Prior to 20th century ==
- 1776 – Nueva Guatemala de la Asuncion founded, following destruction by earthquake of former Spanish colonial capital Antigua.
- 1778 – Population: 10,841.
- 1779 – City becomes capital of Spanish colonial Captaincy General of Guatemala.
- 1789 – Plaza Mayor fountain erected.
- 1793 – Consulado (merchant guild) established.
- 1813 – Cathedral of Guatemala City inaugurated.
- 1823 – City becomes part of the United Provinces of Central America.
- 1831 – Sociedad Economica museum established.
- 1835 – Capital relocated from Guatemala city to San Salvador.
- 1858 – Theatre founded.
- 1874 - Earthquake.
- 1879 – Gas street lighting installed.
- 1880 – Population: 58,000.
- 1882 – Horse streetcar begins operating.
- 1885 – Electric street lighting installed.
- 1893 – Population: 72,000.
- 1898 – National Museum of Archaeology and Ethnology established.

== 20th century ==
- 1905 - Population: about 97,000.
- 1917 – December 17: Earthquake.
- 1918 – January 4: Earthquake.
- 1921
  - Airport built.
  - Population: 121,000.
- 1924 – Zoo founded.
- 1934 – Museo Nacional de Historia y Bellas Artes (museum) opens.
- 1935 – Torre del Reformador (tower) and Obelisco (monument) erected.
- 1940
  - Guatemala Post Office Building constructed.
  - Population: 186,000.
- 1943 – National Palace rebuilt.
- 1949 – Club Social y Deportivo Comunicaciones (football club) formed.
- 1950
  - Estadio Mateo Flores and Estadio del Ejército (stadiums) open.
  - City hosts 1950 Central American and Caribbean Games.
  - Population: 284,276.
- 1957 – National Library of Guatemala new building opens.
- 1966 – Del Valle University of Guatemala founded.
- 1971 – Francisco Marroquin University founded.
- 1973 – Population: 706,920.
- 1975 – Museo Nacional de Arte Moderno "Carlos Mérida" established.
- 1976 – February 4: 1976 Guatemala earthquake.
- 1978 – National Theatre opens.
- 1984 – El Mezquital occupied.
- 1990 – Population: 1,675,589 (estimate).
- 1991
  - Estadio Cementos Progreso (stadium) opens.
  - Óscar Berger becomes mayor.
- 1996 – Álvaro Arzú becomes President of Guatemala.
- 1997 – Tikal Futura shopping mall built.
- 1999 – Club Premier hi-rise built.
- 2000
  - Fritz García Gallont becomes mayor.
  - Galileo University founded.
  - Domo (arena) built.

== 21st century ==
- 2001
  - City hosts 2001 Central American Games.
  - Population: 1,022,001.
- 2002 – Museo Miraflores (archaeological museum) founded.
- 2004
  - Guatemala City Railway Museum inaugurated.
  - Álvaro Arzú becomes mayor again.
- 2005 – March: Protest against Central American Free Trade Agreement.
- 2007
  - February 19: Salvadoran congressmen killings discovered near city.
  - February 23: Sinkhole collapse.
- 2009 – Guatemala National Police Archives headquartered in city.
- 2010 – May 30: Sinkhole collapse.
- 2012 – July: Teacher unrest over upscaled requirements of studying a university degree to become a teacher in the country.
- 2013 – Air pollution in Guatemala City reaches annual mean of 41 PM2.5 and 56 PM10, more than recommended.
- 2018 – June: 2018 Volcán de Fuego eruption occurs in vicinity of city.

== See also ==
- Guatemala City history
- Guatemala City metropolitan area
- History of Guatemala

== Bibliography ==
=== Published in the 19th century ===
- John Baily (1850). "Guatemala". Central America; Describing Each of the States of Guatemala, Honduras, Salvador, Nicaragua, and Costa Rica. London: Trelawney Saunders. "City of New Guatemala"
- John L. Stephens (1856), "(Guatemala City)", Incidents of Travel in Central America, Chiapas, and Yucatan, New York: Harper & Brothers, hdl:2027/umn.319510024030325 (describes the city in 1840)
- William Eleroy Curtis (1888), "Guatemala City", The Capitals of Spanish America, New York: Harper & Bros.
- Manuel T. Ovalle (1889). Directorio del viajero en la Republica de Guatemala [Traveler's Guide to the Republic of Guatemala] (in Spanish). Guatemala: Imprenta de la Aurora. (includes city directory)
- Alfred Ronald Conkling (1893), "Guatemala", Appletons' Guide to Mexico, New York: D. Appleton & Company

=== Published in the 20th century ===
- "Guatemala la Nueva" . Encyclopædia Britannica. Vol. 12 (11th ed.). 1910. pp. 664–665.
- José Toribio Medina (1910). La imprenta en Guatemala (1660–1821) (in Spanish). Santiago de Chile – via HathiTrust. (Annotated list of titles published in Guatemala City, arranged chronologically)
- W.H. Koebel, ed. (1921), "Guatemala: Chief Towns: Guatemala", Anglo-South American Handbook, vol. 1, New York: Macmillan, hdl:2027/mdp.39015027978728
- Ernst B. Filsinger (1922), "Guatemala", Commercial Travelers' Guide to Latin America, Washington, DC: Government Printing Office
- Theodore Caplow (1949). "Social Ecology of Guatemala City". Social Forces. 28 (2): 113–133. doi:10.2307/2572637. JSTOR 2572637.
- Sidney D. Markman (1966). "Plaza Mayor of Guatemala City". Journal of the Society of Architectural Historians. 25 (3): 181–196. doi:10.2307/988399. JSTOR 988399.
- "Guatemala City", Guatemala, Rough Guides, 1998, p. 47+, OL 9003520M
- Edward Murphy (2004). "Developing Sustainable Peripheries: The Limits of Citizenship in Guatemala City". Latin American Perspectives. 31 (6): 48–68. doi:10.1177/0094582X04269911. JSTOR 4141607. S2CID 143725333.
- David F. Marley (2005), "Guatemala City", Historic Cities of the Americas, vol. 2, Santa Barbara, California: ABC-CLIO, p. 339+, ISBN 1-57607-027-1
