= Tropical Storm Agatha =

Pacific tropical storm in 2010

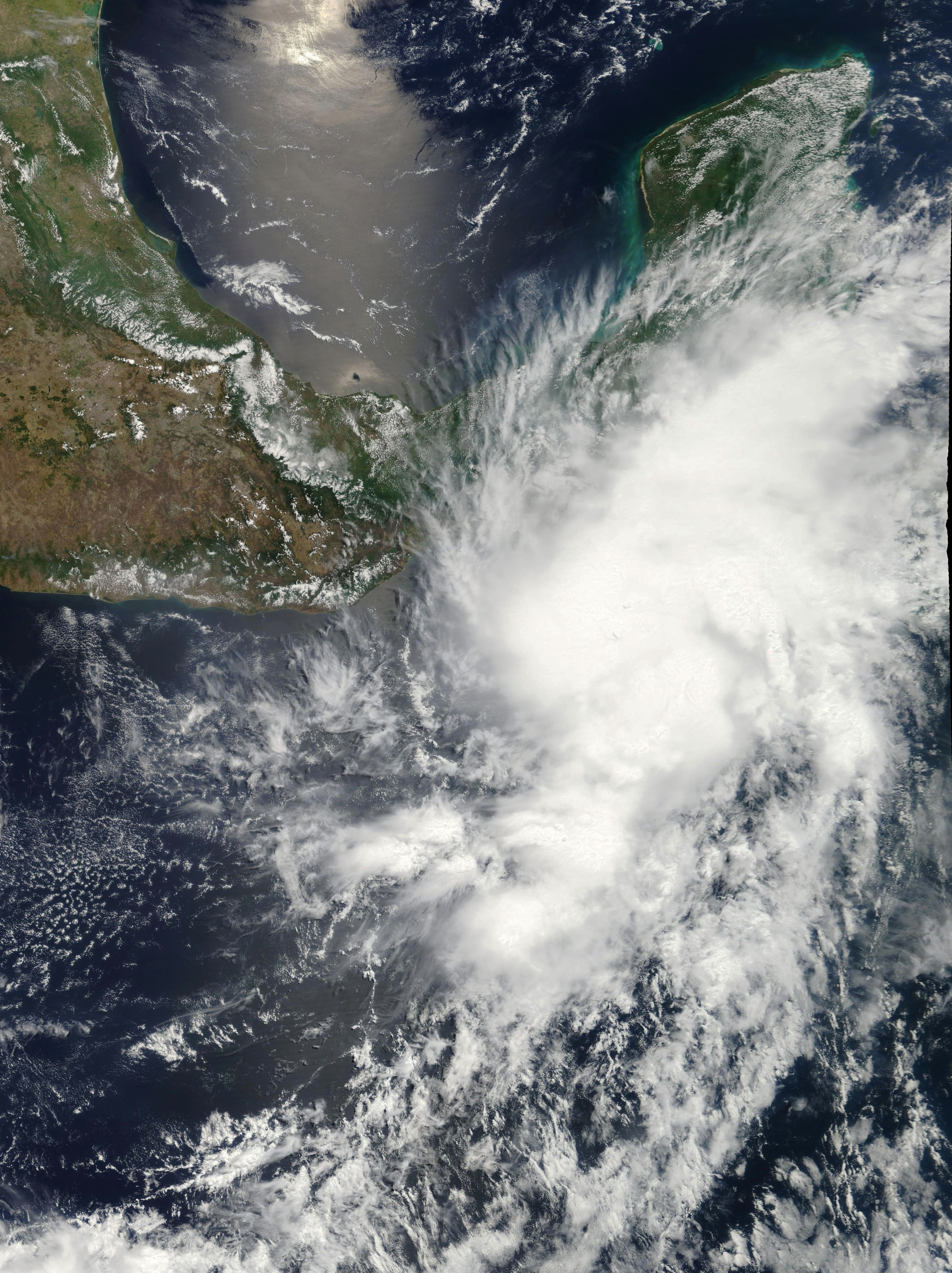
- Tropical Storm Agatha near peak intensity off the coast of Guatemala on May 29.

Meteorological history
- Formed: May 29, 2010
- Remnant low: May 31, 2010
- Dissipated: June 1, 2010

Tropical storm
- 1-minute sustained (SSHWS/NWS)
- Highest winds: 45 mph (75 km/h)
- Lowest pressure: 1001 mbar (hPa); 29.56 inHg

Overall effects
- Fatalities: 204
- Damage: $1.1 billion (2010 USD)
- Areas affected: Southwestern Mexico and Central America; especially Guatemala
- IBTrACS /
- Part of the 2010 Pacific hurricane season

Tropical Storm Agatha was a weak but deadly tropical cyclone that brought widespread floods to much of Central America, and was the deadliest storm in the eastern Pacific tropical cyclone basin since Hurricane Pauline in 1997. The first named storm of the 2010 Pacific hurricane season, Agatha originated from the Intertropical Convergence Zone, a region of thunderstorms across the tropics. It developed into a tropical depression on May 29 and tropical storm later, it was dissipated on May 30, reaching top winds of 45 mph (75 km/h) and a lowest pressure of 1000 mbar (hPa; 29.53 inHg). It made landfall near the Guatemala–Mexico border on the evening of May 29. Agatha produced torrential rain all across Central America, which resulted in the death of one person in Nicaragua. In Guatemala, 152 people were killed and 100 left missing by landslides. Thirteen deaths also occurred in El Salvador. Agatha soon dissipated over Guatemala. As of June 15, officials in Guatemala have stated that 165 people were killed and 113 others are missing.

In all, Agatha caused at least 204 fatalities, and roughly $1.1 billion in damage throughout Central America. Despite the catastrophic damage in Guatemala, along with a high fatality rate, Agatha was not retired, and therefore was used again in the 2016 season.

== Meteorological history ==
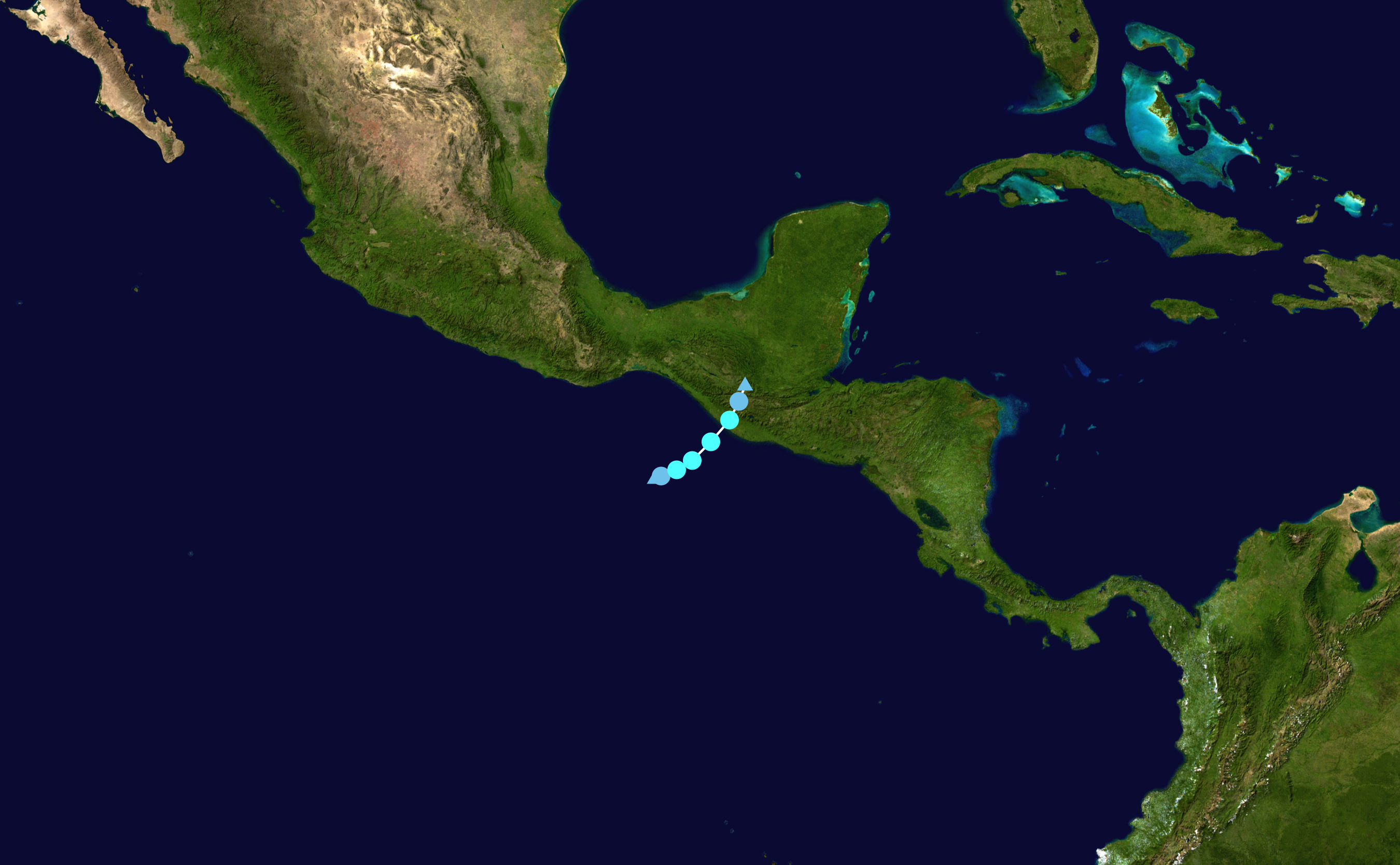
Map plotting the storm's track and intensity, according to the Saffir–Simpson scale Map key Saffir–Simpson scale Tropical depression (≤38 mph, ≤62 km/h) Tropical storm (39–73 mph, 63–118 km/h) Category 1 (74–95 mph, 119–153 km/h) Category 2 (96–110 mph, 154–177 km/h) Category 3 (111–129 mph, 178–208 km/h) Category 4 (130–156 mph, 209–251 km/h) Category 5 (≥157 mph, ≥252 km/h) Unknown Storm type Tropical cyclone Subtropical cyclone Extratropical cyclone, remnant low, tropical disturbance, or monsoon depression

Tropical Storm Agatha originated from an area of convection, or thunderstorms, that developed on May 24, off the west coast of Costa Rica. At the time, there was a trough in the region that extended into the southwestern Caribbean Sea, associated with the Intertropical Convergence Zone. The system drifted northwestward, and conditions favored further development. On May 25, the convection became more concentrated, and the National Hurricane Center (NHC) noted the potential for a tropical depression to develop. The next day, it briefly became disorganized, as its circulation was broad and elongated; however, the disturbance was in a very moist environment, and multiple low level centers gradually organized into one. The low continued to get better organized; however, there was a lack of a well-defined circulation. On May 29, after further organization of the circulation and convection, the NHC initiated advisories on Tropical Depression One-E while the system was located about 295 miles (475 km) west of San Salvador, El Salvador.

Upon becoming a tropical cyclone, the system was located in an environment with little wind shear and waters of 30 °C (86 °F). As such, it was expected to strengthen, although the mountainous terrain of the Central American coastline limited significant intensification. The depression moved slowly northeastward around the western periphery of a ridge located over northern South America. Several hours later, satellites monitoring the system discovered tropical storm-force winds, prompting the NHC to upgrade the depression to Tropical Storm Agatha. Around this time, it was noted that there was a 40% chance of the system undergoing rapid intensification within the following 24 hours as the only limiting factor was its proximity to land. However, the storm failed to intensify much, peaking in intensity with winds of 45 mph (75 km/h) and a barometric pressure of 1001 mbar (hPa; 29.56 inHg). Within two hours of reaching this strength, Agatha abruptly relocated northward and made landfall at 22:30 UTC near Champerico, Guatemala.

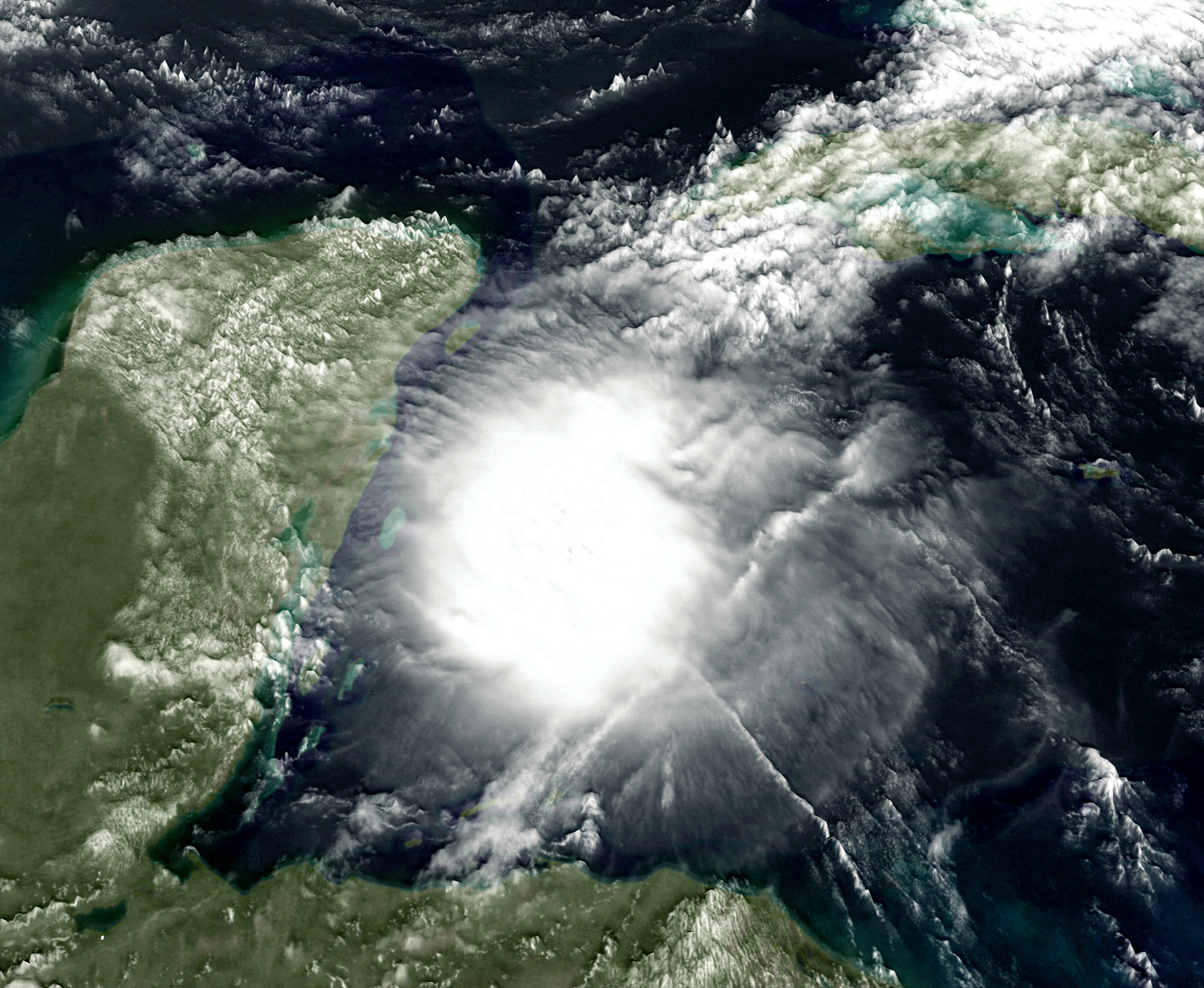
The remnants of Agatha in the western Caribbean Sea on June 1

After landfall, Agatha continued to cause floods and landslides, however it did not bring a lot of tropical storm force winds on shore. The system weakened quickly after coming on shore, dropping its winds to 25 mph (20 knots, 40 km/h) and its pressure to 1007 mbar (hPa; 29.74 inHg) before dissipating. A burst of convection re-emerged east of Belize, in the Atlantic basin, on May 31. On June 1, the National Hurricane Center stated that the remnants of Tropical Storm Agatha had only a low chance of regeneration in the western Caribbean Sea.

== Preparations and background ==
Upon the formation of Tropical Depression One-E on May 29, the Government of Guatemala declared a tropical storm warning for the entire Pacific coastline. Due to the system's proximity to land, tropical storm force winds were expected to reach the coast by the evening hours, making outdoor preparations difficult. Additionally, the depression's slow movement was expected to lead to enormous rainfall totals, exceeding 30 in (760 mm) in some areas. This rain was expected to produce large-scale, life-threatening flash flooding and landslides across Guatemala, El Salvador and southeastern Mexico. Once the system intensified into Tropical Storm Agatha, the National Hurricane Center expected areas to the south and east of the landfall location to experience storm surge along with destructive waves. By the late morning of May 29, Guatemalan officials placed all hospitals on high alert and declared a state of calamity. President Álvaro Colom also began to use some of the $85 million allocated as emergency funds by the World Bank. After the storm moved over land and weakened to a tropical depression, the tropical storm warnings along the coast were discontinued.

Throughout El Salvador and Nicaragua, emergency officials evacuated about 2,000 residents due to the threat of flash flooding. In response to the approaching storm, a yellow alert was declared for all of El Salvador and it was estimated that roughly 89% of the country was at risk from flooding. Roughly 52,000 police, emergency rescue personnel and soldiers were placed on standby by the Dirección General de Protección Civil.

On May 27, two days before Agatha became a tropical depression, the Pacaya volcano, located about 25 mi (40 km) south of Guatemala City, erupted, killing at least one person and blanketing nearby areas with layers of ash. The eruption prompted officials to shut down the country's international airport for at least five days. Upon the formation of Agatha, people feared that excessive rainfall from the storm could exaggerate the situation and trigger lahars. This had the effect of clogging the underground pipes with soot, increasing the chances of pipe rupture. However, the precipitation would prove beneficial to farmers by removing ash from their trees.

== Impact ==
Impact by country
Country	Fatalities	Missing	Damage (USD)
El Salvador	11	2	$112 million
Guatemala	174	13	$982 million
Honduras	18	0	$18.5 million
Mexico	0	0	Minimal
Nicaragua	1	0	Minimal
Total	204	15	~$1.1 billion

=== Nicaragua ===
Prior to becoming a tropical depression, the system produced torrential rainfall in Nicaragua, resulting in the death of one person after she was swept away by a swollen river. Many homes and bridges were destroyed across the country. In Estelí Department, the Nicaraguan Air Force had to rescue 24 people trapped in their homes.

=== Guatemala ===
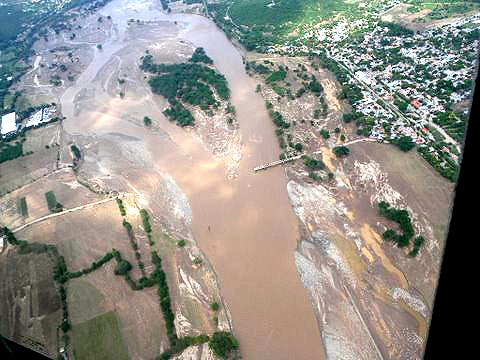
Flooding triggered by Agatha in Guatemala

According to meteorologists in Guatemala, at least 14 in (360 mm) of rain had fallen by the evening of May 29. Several landslides blocked roadways across southern areas of the country, hindering traffic. As of June 15, the Government of Guatemala confirmed that 165 people died as a result of Agatha and 113 others were missing. A mudslide coming down the Agua volcano left 9 deaths and 12 disappeared in the town of San Miguel Escobar. In the town of Almolonga, department of Quetzaltenango, a mudslide triggered by the storm killed four people after destroying their home, and in total twelve people were killed in Guatemala, while another landslide left 11 people missing. In terms of infrastructural damage, more than 18,700 were destroyed throughout the country and damage was likely to exceed $1 billion. According to Reuters, more than 100,000 homes were destroyed by the storm, a significantly higher number than stated in other reports. Due to the extensive damage to Guatemala's coffee farms, the crop was expected to be reduced by 3%. Across the country, 1,283 schools were badly damaged or destroyed, leading to concerns of when students could actually resume classes. Additionally, at least 20,000 people have been left homeless as a result of the storm. Some areas recorded the heaviest rainfall in over 60 years, measuring more than 36 in (910 mm). This also ranks Agatha as the wettest known tropical cyclone to ever strike the country, surpassing Hurricane Mitch.

On May 30, a large sinkhole approximately 20 m (65 feet) in diameter and 90 m (300 feet) deep occurred in Guatemala City's Zona 2. The sinkhole occurred because of a combination of reasons, including Tropical Storm Agatha, the Pacaya Volcano eruption, and leakage from sewer pipes. The geologic formation appeared suddenly, destroying a three-story building. Officials compared the event to another Guatemalan sinkhole collapse in 2007, which may also have been formed by ruptured sewage pipes. Torrential rains from the storm widened the cavity, eventually causing the collapse of the sinkhole. The sinkhole formed due to volcanic pumice deposits, upon which Guatemala City is built. These deposits were unconsolidated and of low density, allowing easy erosion. According to Sam Bonis, a geologist at Dartmouth College, leaking pipes went unfixed long enough to create the conditions necessary for sinkhole formation because of city zoning regulations and building codes. Bonis also says that the Guatemala City sinkhole is a misnomer: sinkholes have natural causes, but this one was mainly artificial. In addition, according to Bonis, sinkholes are usually formed from limestone, but there is no limestone hundreds of metres underneath Guatemala City. The sinkhole appeared almost perfectly round and seemed to defy reality, raising significant concerns about the structural integrity of the surrounding area and the impact of urban development on natural landscapes. There is controversy regarding the classification of the 2010 Guatemala City incident. Some experts believe it's a "piping feature" incident and should not be considered a sinkhole, because "the hole was not made by the same ecological processes as a sinkhole."

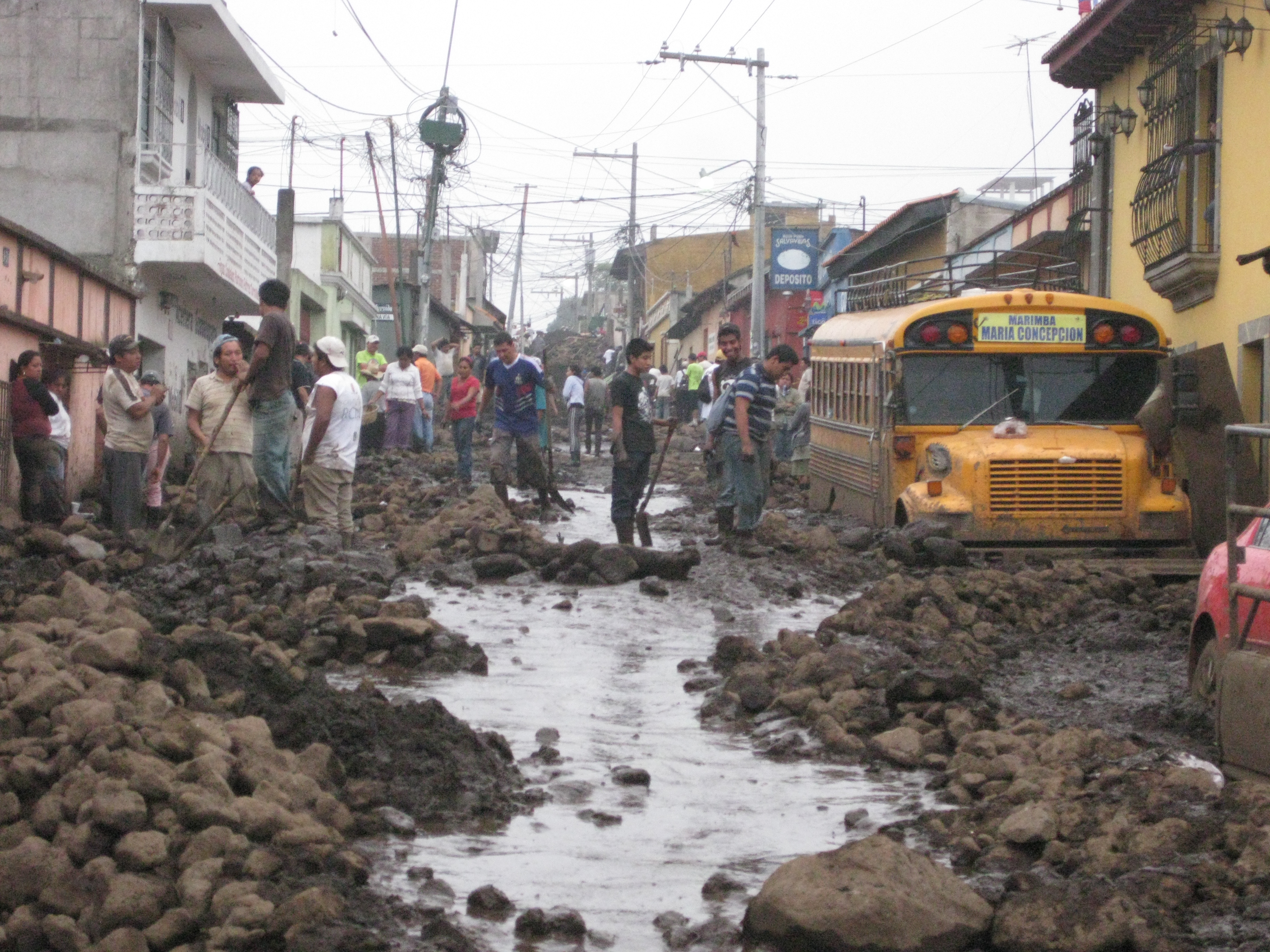
Deadly mudslide in San Miguel Escobar.

Following the catastrophic damage caused by Agatha, Guatemalan officials began evacuating numerous residents from areas at-risk from flooding and landslides. By May 31, an estimated 150,000 people were relocated, of which 36,000 had been placed in shelters. The number of evacuees gradually rose throughout the following weeks, with a total of 162,857 people having been evacuated. Officials in the country declared a state of emergency during the afternoon of May 29 as conditions worsened. Many rivers in the country were already swollen and close to over-topping their banks. Many other homes were destroyed in widespread floods and dozens of emergency rescues had to be made.

=== Mexico ===
Costliest Pacific hurricanes
Rank	Cyclone	Season	Damage	Ref
1	5 Otis	2023	$12–16 billion	
2	1 Manuel	2013	$4.2 billion	
3	4 Iniki	1992	$3.1 billion	
4	3 John	2024	$2.45 billion	
5	4 Odile	2014	$1.82 billion	
6	TS Agatha	2010	$1.1 billion	
7	4 Hilary	2023	$948 million	
8	5 Willa	2018	$825 million	
9	1 Madeline	1998	$750 million	
10	2 Rosa	1994	$700 million	

Throughout southern Mexico, Agatha produced strong winds and heavy rain, as well as high waves, estimated between 2 and 4 m (6.6 and 13.1 ft) high. At least 120 families were evacuated from southeastern Chiapas, near where the storm made landfall. A yellow alert was also declared for the state as significant flooding was anticipated.

=== Honduras ===
After moving inland over Guatemala and Mexico, torrential rains from the remnants of Agatha triggered flash flooding and landslides in parts of Honduras. At least 45 homes have been destroyed and one person was killed in the country. On May 31, the presidents of both El Salvador and Honduras declared a state of emergency for their respective countries.

=== El Salvador ===
In El Salvador, widespread flooding took place as heavy rains fell across the country. Throughout San Salvador and five other cities threatened by flooding, emergency officials urged residents to evacuate to shelters. A total of 140 landslides occurred. The highest known rainfall total in the country was 400 mm (15.7 in); however, further rains have fallen since this total was reported. A total of six people were killed in the country. At least two other people are reported missing in the country. By May 30, President Mauricio Funes declared a country-wide state of emergency due to the widespread damage caused by Agatha. According to the Office for the Coordination of Humanitarian Affairs, a total of 12 people were killed by Agatha throughout El Salvador and roughly 120,000 individuals were affected across 116 municipalities. At one point, more than 15,000 people were housed in emergency shelters; however, by June 9, this number decreased to just 712. A total of 3,162 acres (12.80 km^{2}) of farmland was flooded by the storm, leaving $6 million in losses. Unlike Guatemala which suffered extreme damage in its educational sector, most schools in El Salvador were functional after the storm's passage. Of the 378 schools affected, 63 sustained severe damage. Overall, Agatha wrought $31.1 million in damage across El Salvador.

== Aftermath ==
Following the catastrophic damage caused by Agatha, Guatemalan officials began evacuating numerous residents from areas at-risk from flooding and landslides. By May 31, an estimated 150,000 people were relocated, of which 36,000 had been placed in shelters. The number of evacuees gradually rose throughout the following weeks, with a total of 162,857 people having been evacuated.

Immediately following reports of fatalities in Guatemala, a state of emergency was declared for the entire country. Later on, President Álvaro Colom stated that, "We believe Agatha could wreak more damage in the country than Hurricane Mitch and Hurricane Stan". These storms were two of the most devastating tropical cyclones to impact the country, killing 384 and 1,513 people respectively. On May 31, national aid started to be deployed by the government and donation centers for victims of the storm were opened across the country. According to the Office for the Coordination of Humanitarian Affairs (OCHA), schools in Guatemala were to be closed until at least June 4. However, due to the large number of severely damaged or destroyed schools, few buildings can actually allow for classes to take place and 144 of the schools that are intact are being used as shelters.

By June 1, the Government of Guatemala sent an appeal to the United Nations for roughly $100 million in international assistance to deal with damage wrought by Agatha. On June 14, President Colom stated that it would take at least five years to recover from Tropical Storm Agatha due to the widespread nature of the catastrophe. To obtain the necessary resources to recover from the storm, Colom implemented a substantial tax increase. His goal was to increase the revenue from taxes in the country to 9.8% of the gross domestic product.

Throughout the country, roughly 392,600 people were left in need of humanitarian assistance in the wake of Agatha. Most of these people live in rural areas which became isolated from surrounding areas after flood waters washed out roads and destroyed bridges.

=== International assistance ===
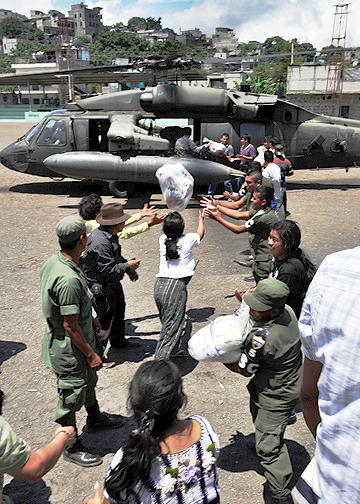
Guatemalan soldiers unloading relief supplies from a Joint Task Force-Bravo UH-60 Blackhawk

As Agatha dissipated over Guatemala, the Government of Mexico expressed their sincere condolences to the two countries and offered to provide the necessary support for them to recover. During the afternoon of May 30, as the true scale of the disaster became apparent, Álvaro Colom requested international assistance. However, due to the eruption of Pacaya, the country's international airport was closed and would remain so for at least another week. In an agreement with the president of El Salvador, it was decided that aid would be flown into El Salvador and transported by ground to Guatemala. However, later reports revealed that two of the four land crossings between the countries were closed off due to flooding and landslides. On May 31, Colombia and the United States offered their assistance by sending aid or helping evacuate residents. By the late morning, six United States military aircraft were en route to Honduras. The Ministry of Foreign Affairs in Taiwan also stated that they would provide aid to Guatemala if necessary.

The Government of France also passed on their condolences to the countries suffering from the disaster and pledged to send emergency humanitarian aid to the region. This was eventually followed up by June 14 when the French embassy in Guatemala provided $50,000 in relief supplies. The initial response from the World Food Programme was to allocate $500,000 to feed 10,000 over a period of 15 days. Other United Nations departments provided much assistance to Guatemala within two days of Agatha's landfall. UNICEF donated roughly $50,000 to support water and sanitation; UNDP allocated $50,000 for assessments and early recovery; the Spanish Agency for International Cooperation for Development provided roughly $185,000 in general humanitarian aid; and the IFRC and UNFPA planned donate $50,000 each. The United States provided immediate funds of GTQ 900,000 (US$112,000); USAID also planned to deploy relief teams with food and emergency supplies to bring to those affected by the storm. Additionally, several helicopters from the United States Southern Command were to be deployed in the region.

By June 1, the European Union had sent $3.7 million in aid to Guatemala as well as Honduras and El Salvador. The Save the Children organization began distributing hygiene kits and other relief supplies on June 4. Over the following weeks, they planned to provide 46 metric tons of supplies.

Extensive losses of the country's food supply left tens of thousands of residents without sustenance, leading to fears of widespread hunger in the nation. In attempts to lessen the severity of the hunger outbreak, the WFP set up over 200 shelters across the country and was estimated to be serving 50,000 people a day by June 9. On June 11, the United Nations made an appeal to supply Guatemala with $14.5 million to aid survivors of the storm. This appeal followed a $34 million request for the country prior to the storm for malnutrition incidents. By June 14, the Government of Japan had provided roughly $220,000 worth of equipment and building materials. Around the same time, ACT Development announced that it planned to assist roughly 2,000 families with all basic life necessities for a month. To start this operation, a preliminary appeal was made to the United Nations for $881,000; a second, full appeal was planned to be published on June 20.

Summary of International Contributions
Country/Organization	Sector	Donation	Goal	Beneficiaries	Source
Food and Agriculture Organization	Agriculture	$849,069	Recovery of grain supply	5,300 families	
Food and Agriculture Organization	Agriculture	$901,111	Restoration of farmer's livelihoods	1,800 families	
Food and Agriculture Organization	Agriculture	$824,516	Restoration of smallholder farmer's livelihoods	2,000 families	
Fundación Equinos Sanos para el Pueblo	Agriculture	$288,000	Recover farming production systems in the municipalities of Tecpán and Acatenango	1,036 families	
CARE	Education	$160,500	Repair educational structures	6,000 people	
United Nations Development Programme	Infrastructure	$267,500	Recovery of key community infrastructure	15,000 people	
United Nations Development Programme	Infrastructure	$80,250	Identification of safe areas to resettle residents	50,000 people	
United Nations Development Programme	Recovery	$53,500	Creation of early recovery framework	102,000 families	
UNESCO	Education	$250,000	Emergency support to education authorities	Education authorities	
World Food Programme	Food	$1,213,000	Provide life-saving assistance to victims	150,000 people	
World Food Programme	Food	$4,846,957	Emergency food assistance	150,000 people	
PAHO and WHO	Health	$160,000	Mental health services	40,000 people	
PAHO and WHO	Health	$590,000	Ensure availability of medicines	90,000 people	
PAHO and WHO	Health	$350,000	Epidemiological surveillance and disease control	10,000 families	
PAHO and WHO	Health	$120,000	Community and family health care	6,000 families	
PAHO and WHO	Health	$100,000	Communication and health promotion	N/A	

=== Filling in the sinkhole ===
The sinkhole took place along a major stormwater collector/drainage tunnel constructed from volcanic tuff, known as pumice. Following the 2010 collapse, municipal authorities rebuilt the collectors and initiated inspections of the main collector, uncovering issues such as groundwater presence, caverns, and concrete cracks. These findings raised concerns about the stability of the collector and urged for comprehensive geophysical investigations to understand the subsoil conditions surrounding it.

Immediately after the sinkhole's collapse, there were plans to fill it in with a soil cement, limestone, and water known locally as lodocreto ("mudcrete"). This substance was also used to fill in the 2007 Guatemala City sinkhole. However, another technique, which geologists call the graded-filter technique, in which the sinkhole is filled with successive layers of boulders, smaller rocks, and gravel, has been suggested as potentially better solution. Slate's Brian Palmer explained that by filling the hole with cement, cement diverted water runoff to other areas, potentially increasing the risk of sinkholes occurring in other parts of the city. The graded-filter technique, on the other hand, allows water to seep through.

== See also ==
- Tropical Storm Hermine (2010)
- List of Pacific hurricanes
- 2010 Pacific hurricane season
