= Shaanxi tiankeng cluster =

Group of 19 karst sinkholes in Shaanxi Province

- Sinkholes
- Location: Shaanxi Province, China

Shaanxi tiankeng cluster is a group of 19 karst sinkholes in Shaanxi Province, China. The discovery was made in February 2016 and announced by geologists on November 24, 2016.

Located within a 200 km-long karst landform belt in the southwest part of the province near Hanzhong City, the cluster is one of the largest on Earth. It includes forty-nine sinkholes and more than fifty funnels ranging from 50–100 metres in diameter. The area is in the Qinling-Bashan Mountains, spread over Hanzhong city's counties of Ningqiang, Nanzheng, Xixiang and Zhenba.

It is the northernmost example of the humid tropical and subtropical karst landform area, lying roughly between the latitudes of 32 and 33 degrees.

From October 25 to 28, 2016, a team surveyed the region. The team was made up of China's resource authorities as well as experts from the UNESCO International Research Center on Karst, the International Union of Speleology, as well as other research bodies of the Czech Republic (the Czech Speleological Society and the Institute of Geology of the Czech Academy of Sciences), China (the Institute of Karst Geology of the Chinese Academy of Sciences), and France.

Among these new sinkholes is one (known as Xiaozhai Tiankeng) that is over 500 metres in diameter. Seventeen are 300–500 metres, and 31 are over 100 metres in diameter and equally deep.

Prior to this discovery, only 130 such sinkholes were known in the world, 90 of which are in China.
