= Sima Humboldt =

Sinkhole in Venezuela

- Interactive map of Sima Humboldt
- Location: Venezuela, Bolívar (state), Sarisariñama
- Coordinates: 4°41′08″N 64°13′07″W
- Depth: 314 m (1,030 ft)
- Discovery: 1961
- Geology: Quartzite
- Access: By special researcher permit only

Sima Humboldt (Sima Mayor) is an enormous sinkhole located on the summit of the plateau of Sarisariñama tepui in Bolívar State, Venezuela. It is unusual for several reasons, including its enormous size and depth, its location on the top of the only forested tepui, having a patch of forest on its base and also due to the weathering process that formed this sinkhole. The feature is named after scientist and explorer Alexander von Humboldt.

The sinkhole was descended for the first time in 1974 and more thoroughly explored in 1976. Its volume is 18,000,000 m^{3} (640,000,000 cu ft), with a maximum width of 352 m (1,155 ft) at its upper rim and 502 m (1,647 ft) below, and a depth of 314 m (1,030 ft).

Only 700 metres from the rim of Sima Humboldt there is another enormous sinkhole, Sima Martel. Both were first spotted in 1961 by pilot Harry Gibson. In total there are four caves on Sarisariñama.
