= Green Banana Hole =

Blue hole off the coast of Sarasota, Florida

- Location within Florida
- Location: Sarasota, Florida
- Coordinates: 26.801192°N 83.081980°W
- Depth: 130 m (427 ft)
- Elevation: -47 m (154 ft)
- Features: One of the deepest blue holes known
- Cave survey: 2020-21

The Green Banana Hole is a blue hole 80 km (50 mi) off the coast of Sarasota, Florida. The rim is approximately 47 m (154 ft) below the surface, and the hole extends downward approximately 130 m (427 ft). Blue holes in this area are thought to have formed as sinkholes on land 8,000 to 12,000 years ago. With lower sea levels at that time, the Florida coastline extended approximately 161 km (100 mi) farther into the ocean. The vertical shape of the hole is roughly like an hourglass, making it especially difficult to explore. It is one of the deepest known blue holes.

== Etymology ==
The name Green Banana was reported to come from the captain of a commercial fishing boat who, while fishing in the area of the hole, saw a green banana skin floating in the water.

== Exploration ==
In 2020 the hole was explored by diver Marty Watson and a team of scientists from Florida Atlantic University. In 2021 scientists from NOAA, Mote Marine Laboratory, and other regional scientific organizations conducted ongoing research using specially designed instruments. Scientists and engineers built an instrument package called a benthic lander. The team hopes to gather information about possible connections between the many blue holes that exist off the coast of Florida and the Floridan aquifer system. This expedition is part of a three-year study and builds on the information and experience gathered from an earlier expedition to Amberjack Hole.

== See also ==
- Marine geology
- Oceanography
- Physical oceanography
