= Sima Martel =

Sinkhole in Venezuela

- Interactive map of Sima Martel
- Location: Venezuela, Bolívar (state), Sarisariñama
- Coordinates: 4.6776°N 64.2221°W
- Depth: 248 m (814 ft)
- Discovery: 1961
- Access: By special researcher permit only

Sima Martel (Sima Menor) is an enormous sinkhole located on the summit of plateau of Sarisariñama tepui, in Bolívar State, Venezuela. It is unusual due to several factors including its enormous size and depth, location on the top of the only forested tepui and having a patch of forest on its base. It is named after the speleologist Édouard-Alfred Martel.

== History ==
Together with the neighbouring Sima Humboldt it was first spotted in 1961 by pilot Harry Gibson.

It was first explored in 1971, and later was explored more thoroughly in 1976. In total there are four caves on Sarisariñama.
