= Suffosion =

Suffosion is one of the two geological processes by which subsidence sinkholes or dolines are formed, the other being due to collapse of an underlying cave or void, with most sinkholes formed by the suffosion process. Suffosion sinkholes are normally associated with karst topography although they may form in other types of rock including chalk, gypsum and basalt. In the karst of the UK's Yorkshire Dales, numerous surface depressions known locally as "shakeholes" are the result of glacial till washing into fissures in the underlying limestone.

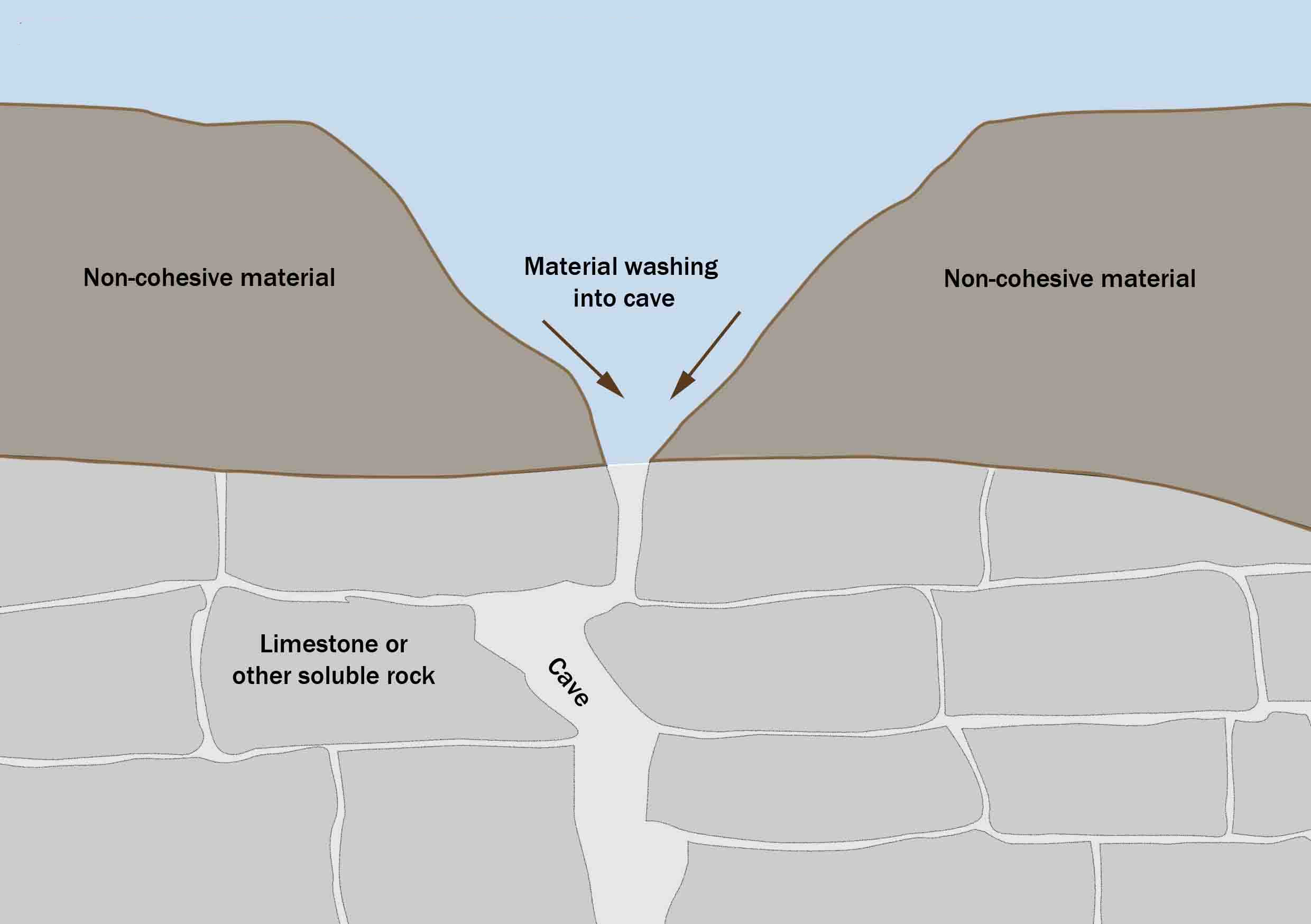
Formation of a suffosion sinkhole

== Process ==
Suffosion occurs when loose soil, loess, or other non-cohesive material lies on top of a limestone substratum containing fissures and joints. Rain and surface water gradually wash this material through these fissures and into caves beneath. Over time, this creates a depression on the landscape of varying depth.

== Suffosion versus suffusion ==
Suffosion is a destructive process that creates instability leading to collapse of the soil structure, characterized by both mass loss and volumetric contraction. In suffosion, coarser particles lose their point-to-point contact. This is in contrast to suffusion, which is non-destructive and is characterized by mass loss without change in volume. In suffusion, coarser particles remain in point-to-point contact and fine particles are removed through the voids between them.
