= Cerro Sarisariñama =

Flat-topped mountain in southeastern Venezuela

Coordinates: 4°33′N 64°14′W

Cerro Sarisariñama is a tepui, a flat-topped mountain in Jaua-Sarisariñama National Park at the far south-west of Bolívar State, Venezuela, near the border with Brazil. Its altitude range is between 300 m (980 ft) and 2,350 m (7,710 ft). The name of the mountain originates from the tale of the local Ye'kuana people about an evil spirit living in caves up in the mountain and devouring human flesh with a sound "Sari... sari...".

The tepui is in one of the most remote areas in the country, with the closest road being 35 miles to the northeast.

== Size ==
Similar to other tepuis, Sarisariñama consists of quartzite of the Roraima formation, belonging to the Paleoproterozoan era. The summit area of Sarisariñama tepui is 546.88 km^{2} (211.15 sq mi) and the slope area is 482 km^{2} (186 sq mi).

== Biology ==
Sarisariñama is unique among tepuis, with a 15–25-metre-high (49–82 ft) forest fully covering the top of it. This isolated ecosystem is especially rich with numerous endemic species of plants and animals.

== Sinkholes ==
The most distinctive features of this tepui are its sinkholes. Reports first began to circulate about them in 1954 after pilots began flying over the tepui. There are four known sinkholes. Two, Sima Humboldt and Sima Martel, are visually unusual, huge, and well known, with isolated forest ecosystems covering their bottoms. The largest one, Sima Humboldt, is up to 352 m (1,155 ft) wide and 314 m (1,030 ft) deep. Another Sarisariñama sinkhole, the 1.35-kilometer-long (0.84 mi) Sima de la Lluvia, has been very important for exploration of the processes of erosion on tepuis.

== Exploration ==
Sarisariñama became a much sought destination for exploration after 1961, when pilot Harry Gibson noticed both enormous sinkholes. The summit of Sarisariñama was not reached until 1974, when a helicopter was used to airlift thirty researchers to the top of the plateau. Initial investigations were done at both sinkholes, including a descent to the bottom of Sima Humboldt. A more thorough speleological investigation was done two years later, in 1976 by a joint Venezuelan-Polish expedition. They discovered one more sinkhole, Sima de la Lluvia. For some two decades it was the longest known quartzite cave (1.35 km) in the world, and its exploration to a great extent solved the mystery of the formation of these sinkholes. Mount Roraima also in Venezuela has the longest quartzite cave in the world with a 10.8-kilometre (6.7 mi) cave.

Currently, access to Sarisariñama is restricted to scientific researchers.

== See also ==
- Gran Sabana
