= Sistema Nacional de Protección Civil, Prevención y Mitigación de Desastres =

Disaster management bureau in El Salvador

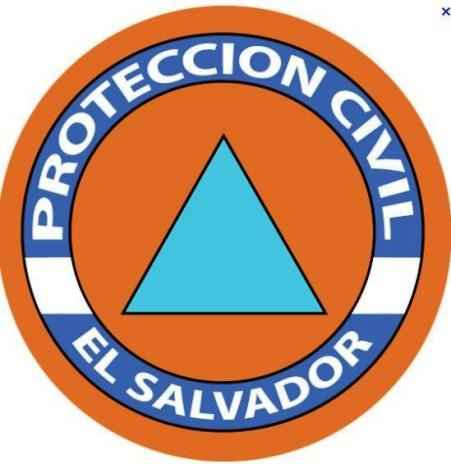

Agency overview
- Formed: August 31, 2005
- Jurisdiction: Government of El Salvador
- Headquarters: 15 Av. Norte y 9a C. Poniente; Torre del Ministerio de Gobernación; San Salvador
- Agency executives: Jorge Antonio Meléndez, General Director; Baudilio Ventura Portillo, Sub-director
- Parent agency: Ministry of the Interior
- Website: www.proteccioncivil.gob.sv

The National Civil Defence System for Disaster Prevention and Mitigation of El Salvador (in Spanish: Sistema Nacional de Protección Civil, Prevención y Mitigación de Desastres), commonly known as "Protección Civil", is an entity created to prevent disasters or reduce their impact on society, and coordinate disaster relief efforts.

The Salvadoran Civil Defence System is part of a Central American network of governmental disaster relief agencies known as the Coordination Center for the Prevention of Natural Disasters in Central America (in Spanish: Centro de Coordinación para la Prevención de los Desastres Naturales en América Central (CEPREDENAC)). CEPREDENAC was created in the context of the Central American Integration System (SICA).
