= Xiaozhai Tiankeng =

Deepest sinkhole in the world, located in China

- Sinkhole
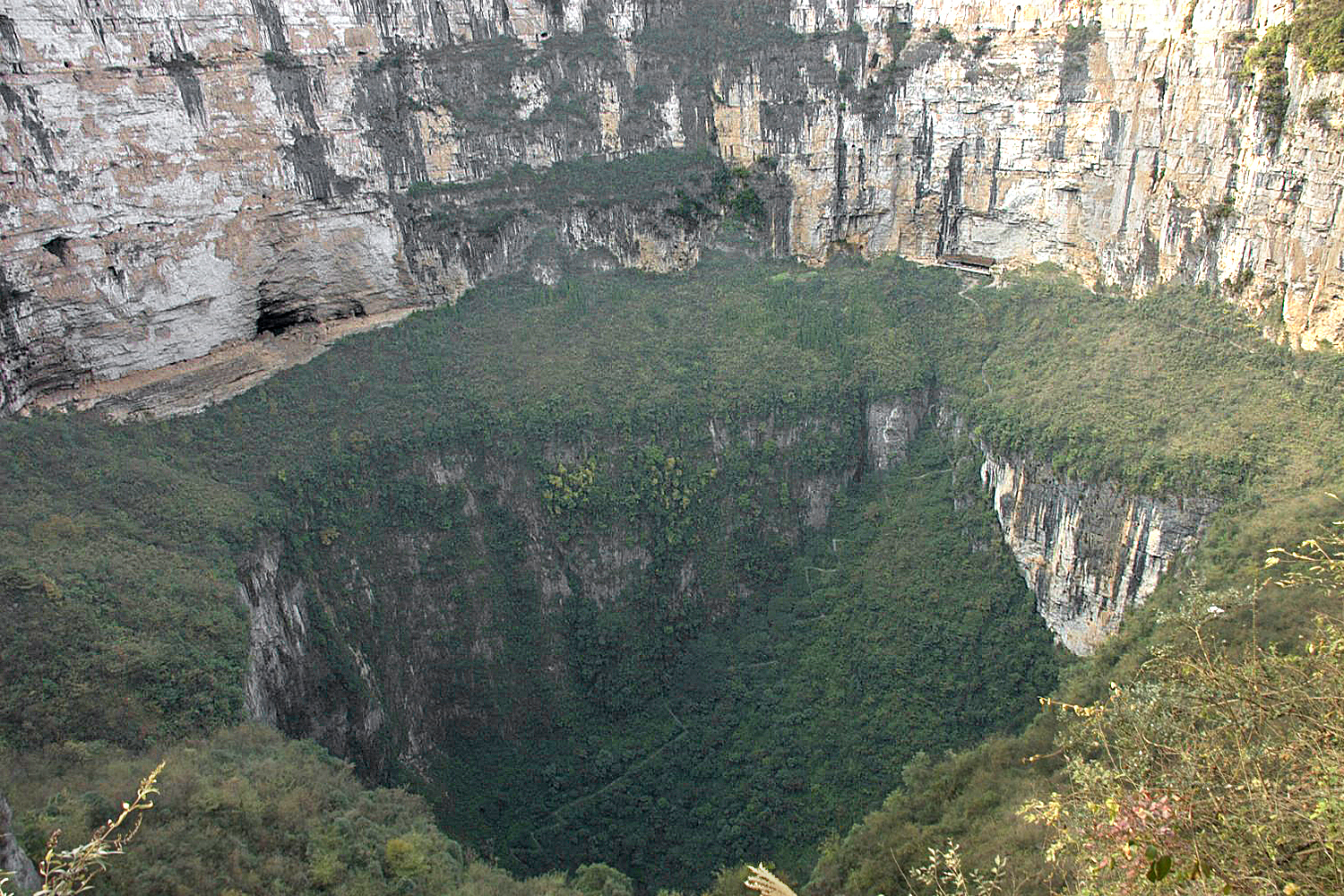

- Location within China
- Coordinates: 30°45′02″N 109°28′12″E
- Location: Fengjie County, Chongqing
- Age: 128,000

Dimensions
  - Length: 626 m (2,054 ft)
  - Width: 537 m (1,762 ft)

The Xiaozhai Tiankeng (小寨天坑), also known as the Xiaozhai Heavenly Pit, is the world's deepest sinkhole. It is located in Fengjie County of Chongqing Municipality in China.

== Dimensions ==
The Xiaozhai Tiankeng is 626 meters (2,054 feet) long, 537 meters (1,762 feet) wide, and between 511 and 662 meters (1,677 and 2,172 ft) deep, with vertical walls. Its volume is 119,349,000 m³ and the area of its opening is 274,000 m^{2}. This material has been dissolved and carried away by the river. The sinkhole is a doubly nested structure—the upper bowl is 320 meters (1,050 feet) deep, the lower bowl is 342 meters (1,122 feet) deep, and the two bowls are on average 257 to 268 m (843 to 879 ft) across. Between both these steps is a sloping ledge, formed due to soil trapped in the limestone. In the rainy season, a waterfall can be seen at the mouth of the sinkhole.

== Discovery ==
The Xiaozhai Tiankeng has been well known to local people since ancient times. Xiaozhai is the name of an abandoned village nearby and means "little village", and "Tiankeng" means Heavenly Pit, a regional name for sinkholes in that part of China. A 2,800-step staircase has been constructed in order to accommodate tourism.

== Underground river and cave ==
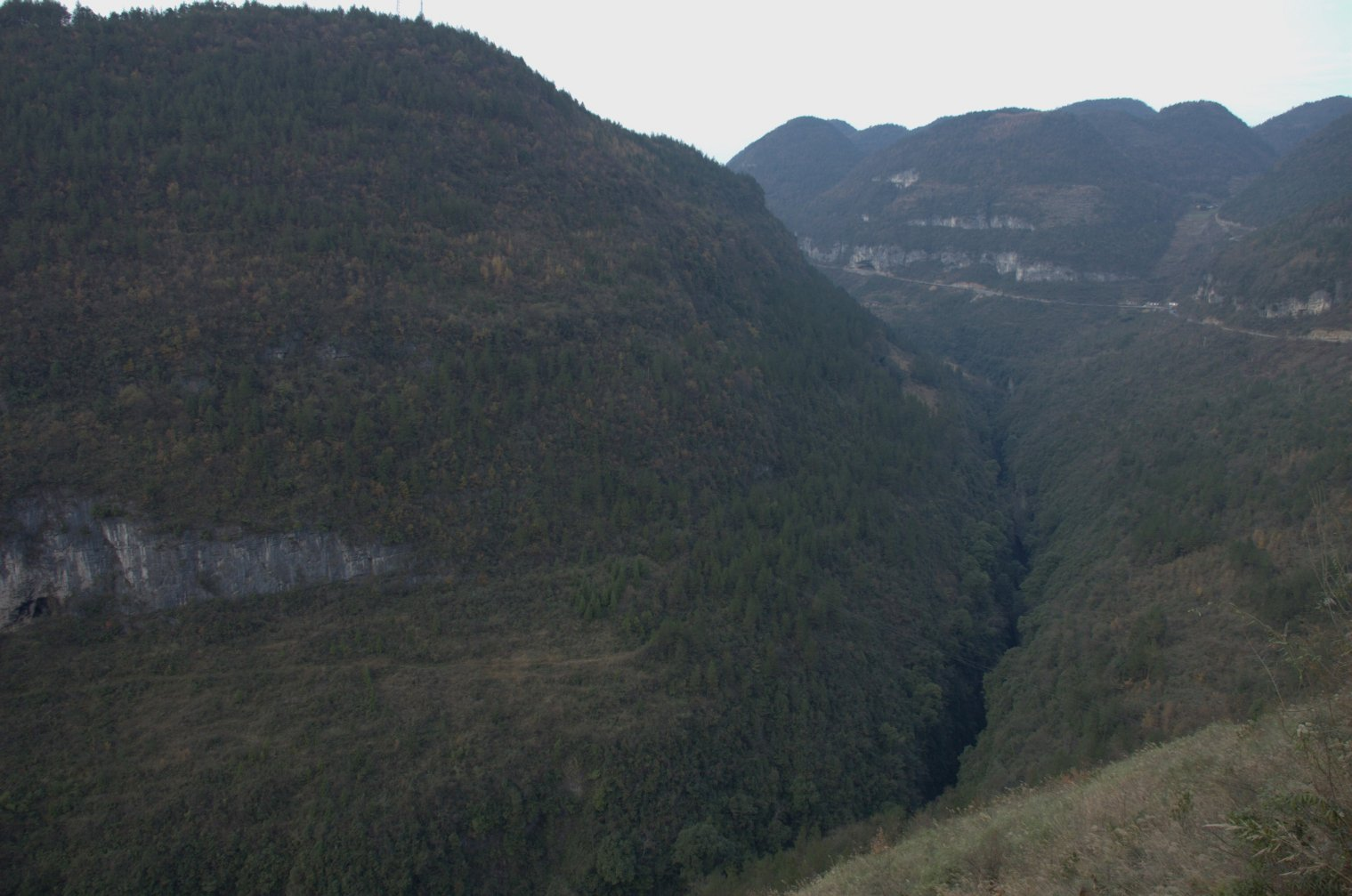
Xiaozhai Tiankeng, Chongqing

The Tiankeng formed over the Difeng cave, which in turn had been formed by a powerful underground river which still flows underneath the sinkhole. The underground river starts in the Tianjin fissure gorge and reaches a vertical cliff above the Migong River, forming a 46-meter-high (151-foot) waterfall. The length of this underground river is approximately 8.5 km (5.3 mi) and during these 8.5 kilometers, it falls 364 meters (1,194 feet). The median annual flow of this river is 8.77 m^{3} per second, but its flow rate can reach 174 m^{3}/s. Both the river and Difeng Cave were explored and mapped by the China Caves Project in 1994.

== Flora and fauna ==
1,285 species of plants, including the ginkgo, and many rare animals, like the clouded leopard and the Chinese giant salamander, have been sighted in the sinkhole.
