= Kilderry =

Rural area in County kerry, Ireland

Coordinates: 52°8′14″N 9°44′56″W

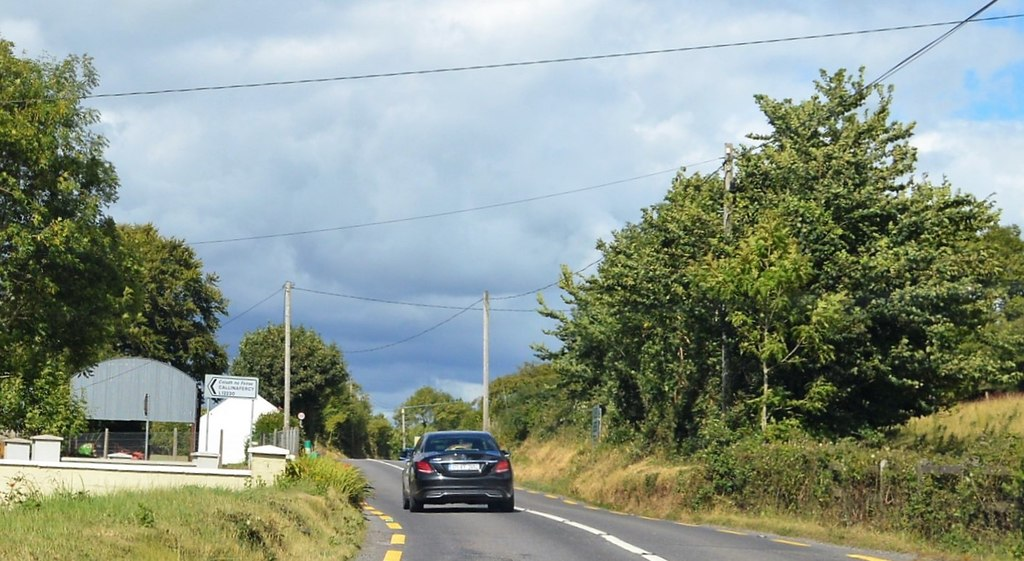
The N70 road passes through Kilderry

Kilderry is a rural area in County Kerry, Ireland. It lies close to the N70 National secondary road between Milltown (2.6 km) and Killorglin (4.8 km). The townlands of Kilderry North (Irish: Cill Doire Thuaidh) and Kilderry South (Irish: Cill Doire Theas) are in the civil parish of Kilcolman.
