= Amberjack Hole =

Blue Hole 48 km off the coast of Sarasota, Florida

- Location within Florida
- Location: Sarasota, Florida
- Coordinates: 27°00′00″N 83°18′00″W
- Depth: 72 m (236 ft)
- Elevation: -34 m (112 ft)
- Cave survey: 2019

The Amberjack Hole is a blue hole located 48 km (30 mi) off the coast of Sarasota, Florida. The rim of the hole is approximately 34 m (112 ft) below the surface, and its depth is approximately 72 m (236 ft).

== Exploration ==
As part of a three-year study, a group of scientists set out in May and September 2019 to explore the region. Individuals from Mote Marine Laboratory, Florida Atlantic University, Harbor Branch, Georgia Institute of Technology, the United States Geological Survey, and the NOAA Office of Ocean Exploration participated in the expedition. The expedition gathered information about life around and within the hole, seawater composition, and the hole's bottom sediments. Scientists found evidence of nutrient flux moving up from the bottom of the hole, indicating food sources are traveling up as well as descending down into the hole. They also found isotopes of radium and radon, common in groundwater indicating there may be a connection between the Floridan aquifer and the bottom of the hole.

== See also ==
- Green Banana Hole
- Marine geology
- Oceanography
- Physical oceanography
