= 2007 Guatemala City sinkhole =

Sinkhole in Guatemala City

Coordinates: 14°39′1.40″N 90°29′25″W

The 2007 Guatemala City sinkhole is a 100-metre (330 ft) deep sinkhole which formed in Guatemala City in 2007, due to sewage pipe ruptures. Its collapse caused the deaths of five people, and the evacuation of over a thousand.

== Formation ==
The sinkhole was created by fluid from a sewer eroding uncemented volcanic ash, limestone, and other pyroclastic deposits underlying Guatemala City. The hazards around the pipe have since then been mitigated, by improved handling of the city's wastewater and runoff, and plans to develop on the site have been proposed. However, critics believe municipal authorities have neglected needed maintenance on the city's aging sewerage system, and have speculated that more piping failures are likely to develop unless action is taken.

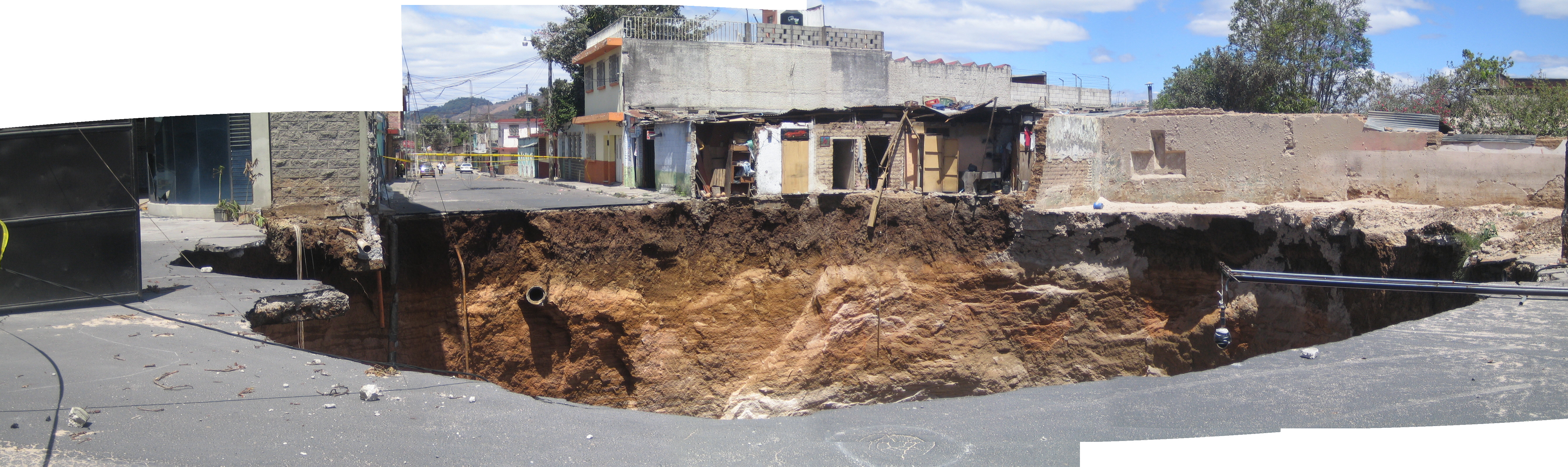
2007 Sinkhole

Several rainstorms also contributed to the sinkhole's collapse, as stormwater percolated into the ground, further dissolving the rocks beneath Guatemala City. Citizens of Guatemala City near the sinkhole also reported hearing rumblings a few weeks before its collapse. The INSIVUMEH (Guatemala's seismology institute) had placed a seismic meter there before the disaster; a robotic camera system was supposed to enter the cavity, but the disaster occurred first.

== Collapse ==
On 23 February 2007, the sinkhole collapsed, forming a very large, deep circular hole with vertical walls and killing five people. Its location was in a poor neighbourhood in northeastern Guatemala City, at the intersection of 24 Avenida and 6 Calle. This hole, which is classified by geologists as a "piping pseudokarst" feature, was 100 m (330 feet) deep. As a result, one thousand people were evacuated from the area. Police established a 460-metre (500-yard) no-go zone around the sinkhole. The hole was later filled in with soil cement made from cement, limestone, and water known locally as lodocreto. $2.7 million was spent by the Guatemalan government in order to fill the sinkhole and to redirect sewage pipes around the area.
