= Helium release valve =

Feature on some watches for saturation diving

A helium release valve, helium escape valve or gas escape valve is a feature found on some diving watches intended for saturation diving using helium based breathing gas.

== Gas ingress problem ==
When saturation divers operate at great depths, they live under pressure in a saturation habitat with an atmosphere containing helium or hydrogen. Since helium atoms are the smallest natural gas particles—the atomic radius of a helium atom is 0.49 angstrom and that of a water molecule is about 2.75 angstrom—they are able to diffuse over about five days into the watch, past the seals which are able to prevent ingress of larger molecules such as water. This is not a problem as long as the watch remains under external pressure, but when decompressing, a pressure difference builds up between the trapped gas inside the watch case and the environment. Depending on the construction of the watch case, seals and crystal, this effect can cause damage to the watch, such as the crystal popping off, as diving watches are designed primarily to withstand external pressure.

== Solutions development ==
Some watch manufacturers manage the internal overpressure effect by simply making the case and sealed connected parts adequately sealed or strong enough to avoid or withstand the internal pressure, but Rolex and Doxa S.A. approached the problem by creating the helium escape valve in the 1960s (first introduced in the Rolex Submariner/Sea-Dweller and the Doxa Conquistador): A small, spring-loaded one-way valve is fitted in the watch case that opens when the differential between internal and external pressure is sufficient to overcome the spring force. As a result, the valve releases the gases trapped inside the watch case during decompression, preventing damage to the watch. The original idea for using a one-way valve came from Robert A. Barth, a US Navy diver who pioneered saturation diving during the US Navy Genesis and SEALAB missions led by Dr. George F. Bond. The patent for the helium escape valve was filed by Rolex on 6 November 1967 and granted on 15 June 1970.

== Solutions application ==
Automatic helium release valves usually don't need any manual operation, but some are backed up by a screw-down crown in the side of the watch, which is unscrewed at the start of decompression to allow the valve to operate. As decompressing saturation divers is a slow working conditions requirements regulated process to prevent sickness and any other harmful medical effects, the helium release valve does not have to be able to cope with extremely rapid decompression scenarios, that can occur in a material/medical pass-through system lock.

Helium release valves can primarily be found on diving watches featuring a water resistance rating greater than 300 m (1000 ft). ISO 6425 defines a diver's watch for mixed-gas diving as: A watch required to be resistant during diving in water to a depth of at least 100 m and to be unaffected by the overpressure of the breathing gas. Models that feature a helium release valve include most of the Omega Seamaster series, Rolex Sea Dweller, Tudor watches Pelagos, some dive watches from the Citizen Watch Co., Ltd, Breitling, Girard-Perregaux, Anonimo, Panerai, Mühle Rasmus by Nautische Instrumente Mühle Glashütte, Deep Blue, Scurfa Watches, all watches produced by Enzo Mechana, Aegir Watches and selected Doxa, selected Victorinox models, Oris models, TAG Heuer Aquaracer models, and the DEL MAR Professional Dive 1000 watch.

Other watch manufacturers such as Seiko and Citizen Watch Co., Ltd still offer high-level dive watches that are guaranteed safe against the effects of mixed-gas diving without needing an additional opening in the case in the form of a release valve. This is normally achieved through the use of special gaskets and monocoque case construction instead of using the more common screw down case-backs.

== Saturation diving water resistance management ==
To enable changing the time or date during their dive, saturation divers have to act somewhat counterintuitively regarding the water resistance management of their diving watches. On the initial and any later blowdown or compression, most saturation divers consciously open the water-resistant crown of their watches to allow the breathing gas inside to equalize the internal pressure to their storage/living environment. This pressure differential mitigation strategy allows them to later open the water-resistant crown at their storage pressure, to be able to adjust their watch if required during their (often weeks long) saturation period under regularly varying pressure levels between worksites. The storage pressure is generally kept equal or only slightly lower than the pressure at the intended divers' working depth. Opening a watch case (by unscrewing a crown) means expanding its internal volume. In a significantly higher external pressure environment, any expansion will be impeded by this environment. Every opening and closing action of a release valve or crown seal involves a risk of dirt, lint or other non-gaseous matter ingress, that can compromise the proper functioning of the seal and watch.

== ISO 6425 divers' watches standard for mixed-gas diving decompression testing ==
The standards and features for diving watches are regulated by the ISO 6425 – Divers' watches international standard. ISO 6425 testing of the water resistance or water-tightness and resistance at a water overpressure as it is officially defined is fundamentally different from non-dive watches, because every single watch has to be tested. ISO 6425 provides specific additional requirements for testing of diver's watches for mixed-gas diving.

Some specific additional requirements for testing of diver's watches for mixed-gas diving provided by ISO 6425 are:

- Test of operation at a gas overpressure. The watch is subject to the overpressure of gas which will actually be used, i.e. 125% of the rated pressure, for 15 days. Then a rapid reduction in pressure to the atmospheric pressure shall be carried out in a time not exceeding 3 minutes. After this test, the watch shall function correctly. An electronic watch shall function normally during and after the test. A mechanical watch shall function normally after the test (the power reserve normally being less than 15 days).
- Test by internal pressure (simulation of decompression). Remove the crown together with the winding and/or setting stem. In its place, fit a crown of the same type with a hole. Through this hole, introduce the gas mixture which will actually be used and create an overpressure of the rated pressure/20 bar in the watch for a period of 10 hours. Then carry out the test at the rated water overpressure. In this case, the original crown with the stem shall be refitted beforehand. After this test, the watch shall function correctly.

== Gallery ==
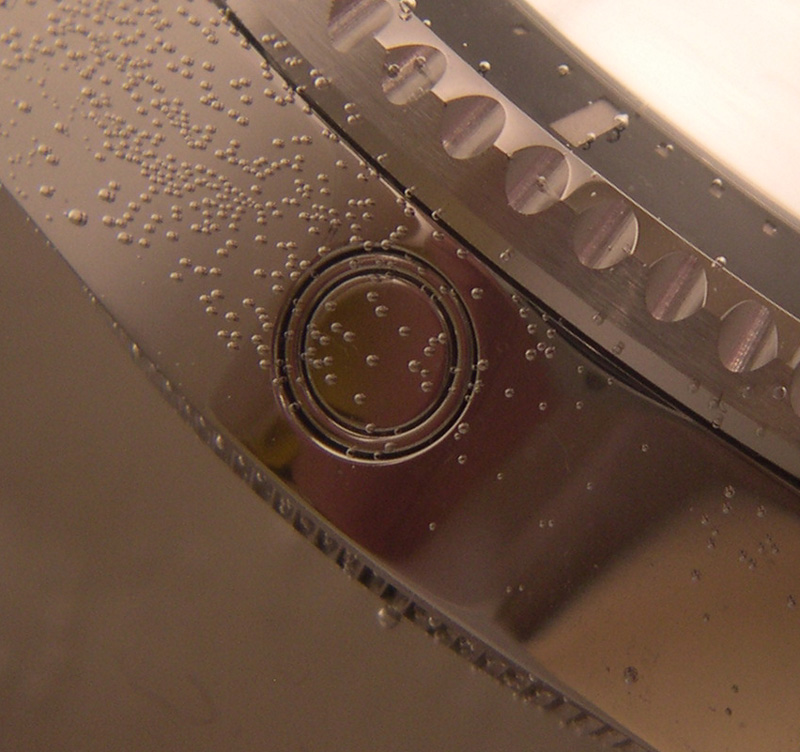
An integrated, automatically operating helium release valve as used by Rolex for the Rolex Sea-Dweller Deepsea variant.

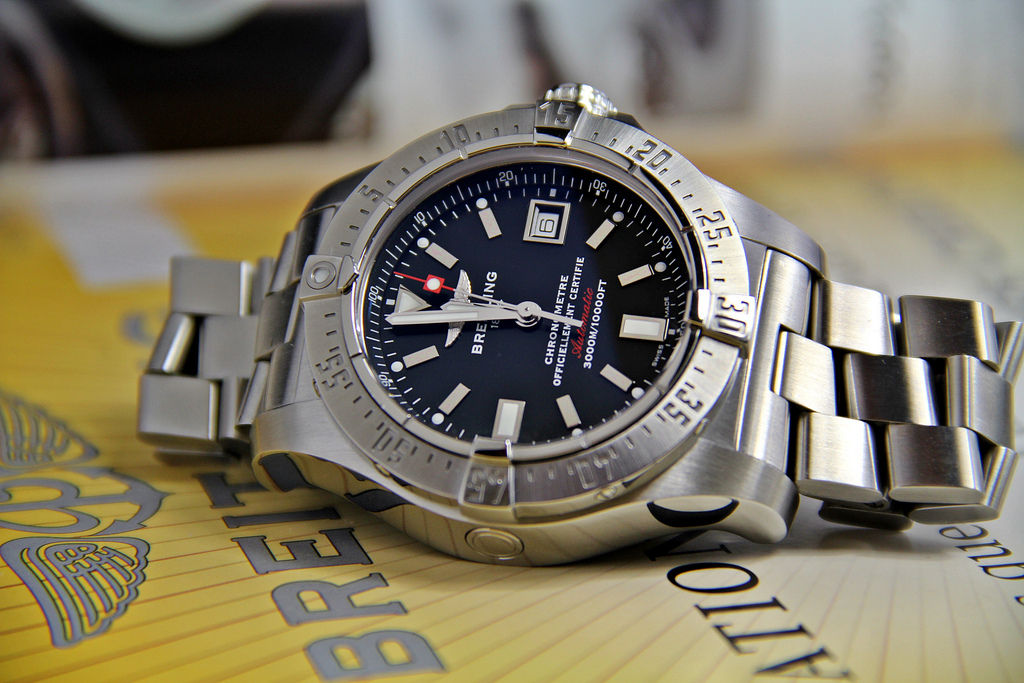
An integrated, automatic helium release valve (at lowermost point of casing) as used by Breitling for the Avenger Seawolf.
