= Doxa SA =

Swiss watch manufacturer

Montres DOXA S.A.
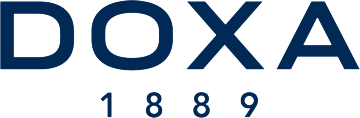
- Trade name: DOXA Watches Ltd. DOXA Uhren AG; Montres DOXA SA
- Type: Société anonyme
- Industry: Watchmaking
- Founded: 1889; 137 years ago in Le Locle
- Founders: Georges Ducommun
- Headquarters: Biel/Bienne, Switzerland
- Area served: Worldwide
- Key people: Jan Edöcs (CEO, 2019–present); Romeo F. Jenny (Managing Director, 2019–present)
- Products: Watches
- Website: doxawatches.com

Montres DOXA S.A. (/ˈdɒksə/), or simply Doxa (often stylized as DOXA), is an independent Swiss watch manufacturer founded in 1889. Doxa is best known for its dive watches. The name Doxa (Δόξα) is the Greek word for "belief" or "opinion", or in Christian contexts, "glory".

Doxa has pioneered numerous innovations in diving watches, including the patented no-decompression bezel, helium release valve, and signature high-visibility orange dial. The company and its SUB watch line became more widely known in the 1960's by partnering with U.S. Divers, Jacques Cousteau, and the United States Navy, and by popularization by author Clive Cussler and his Dirk Pitt character.

== History ==
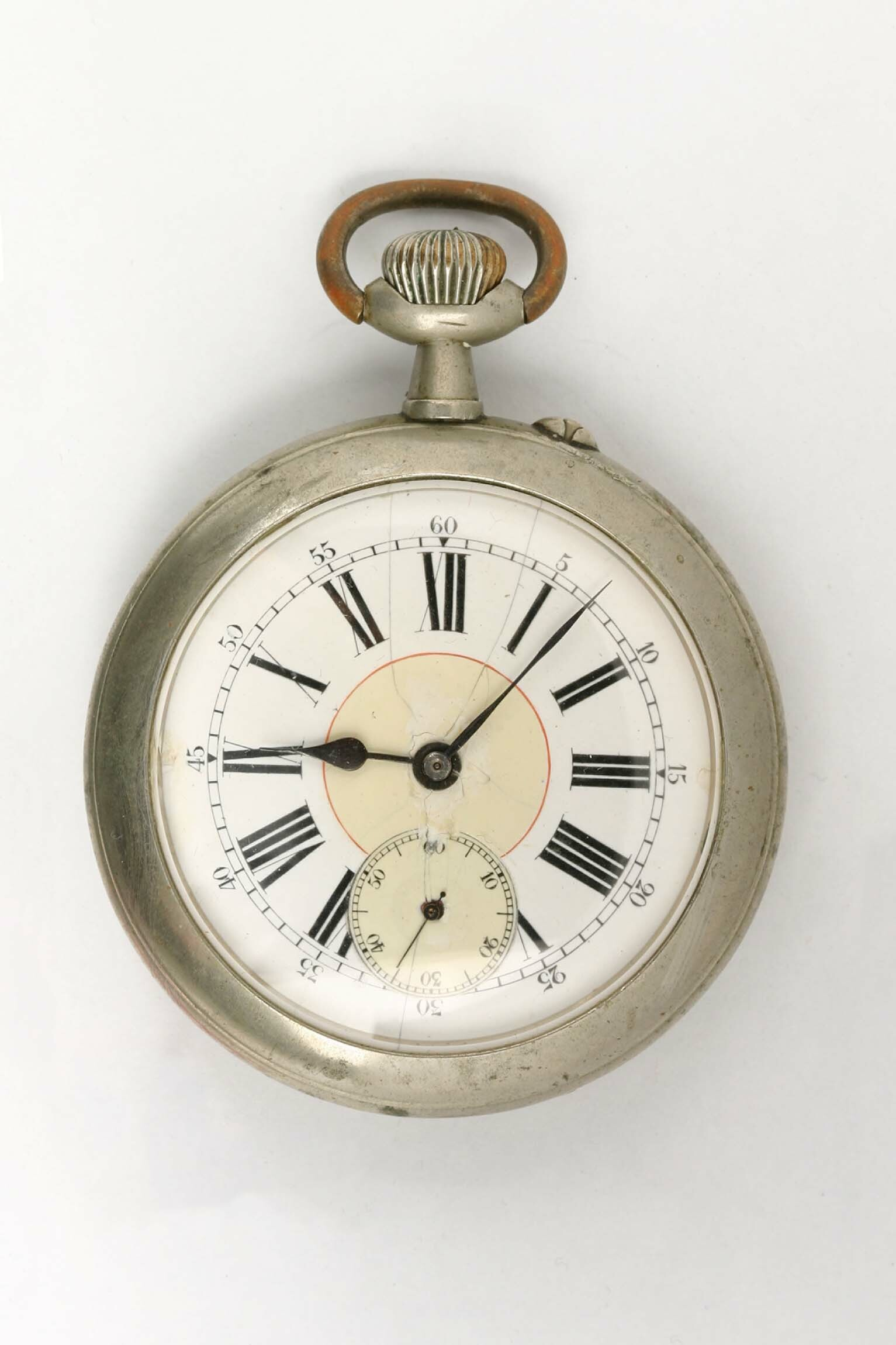
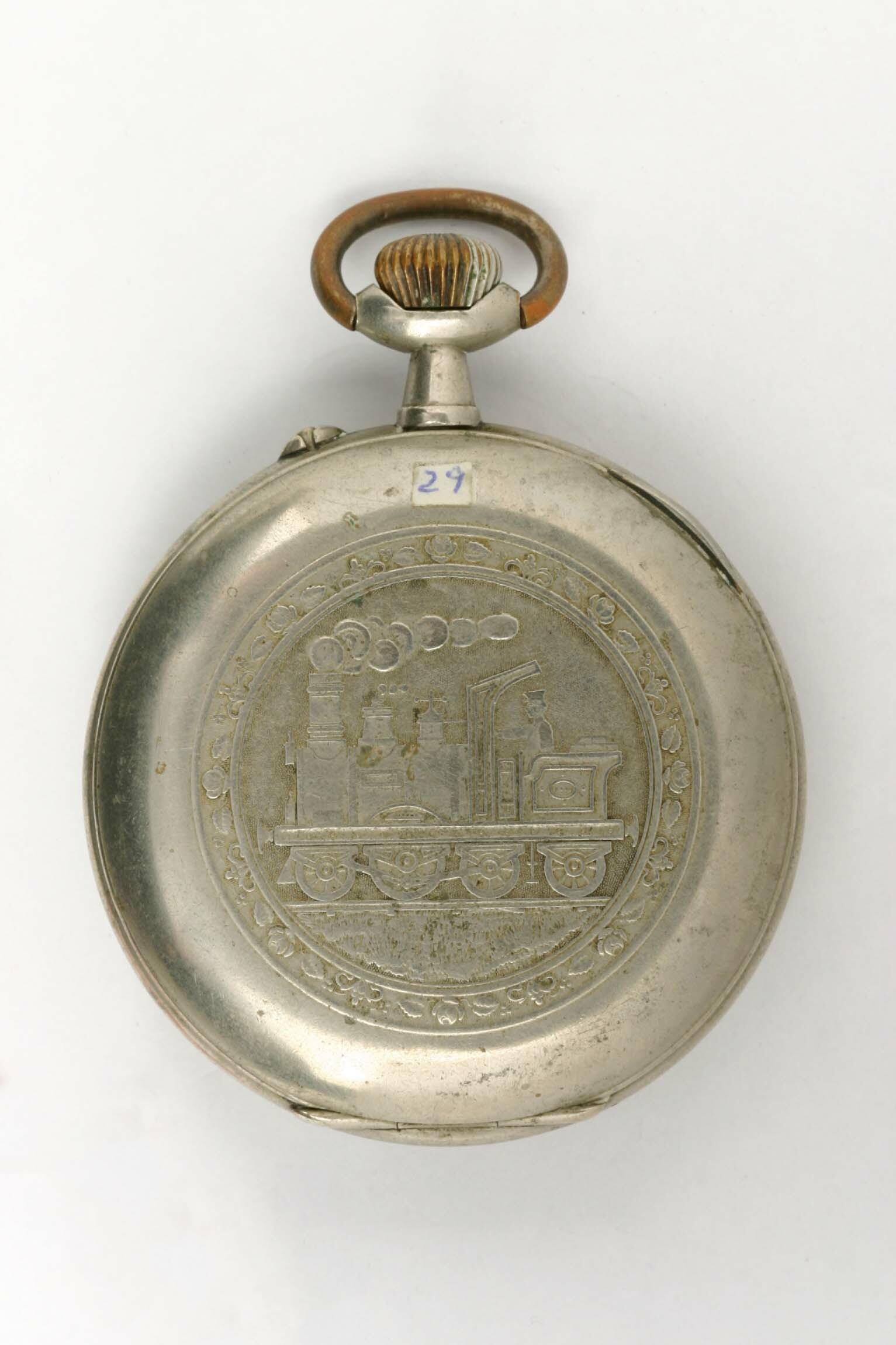
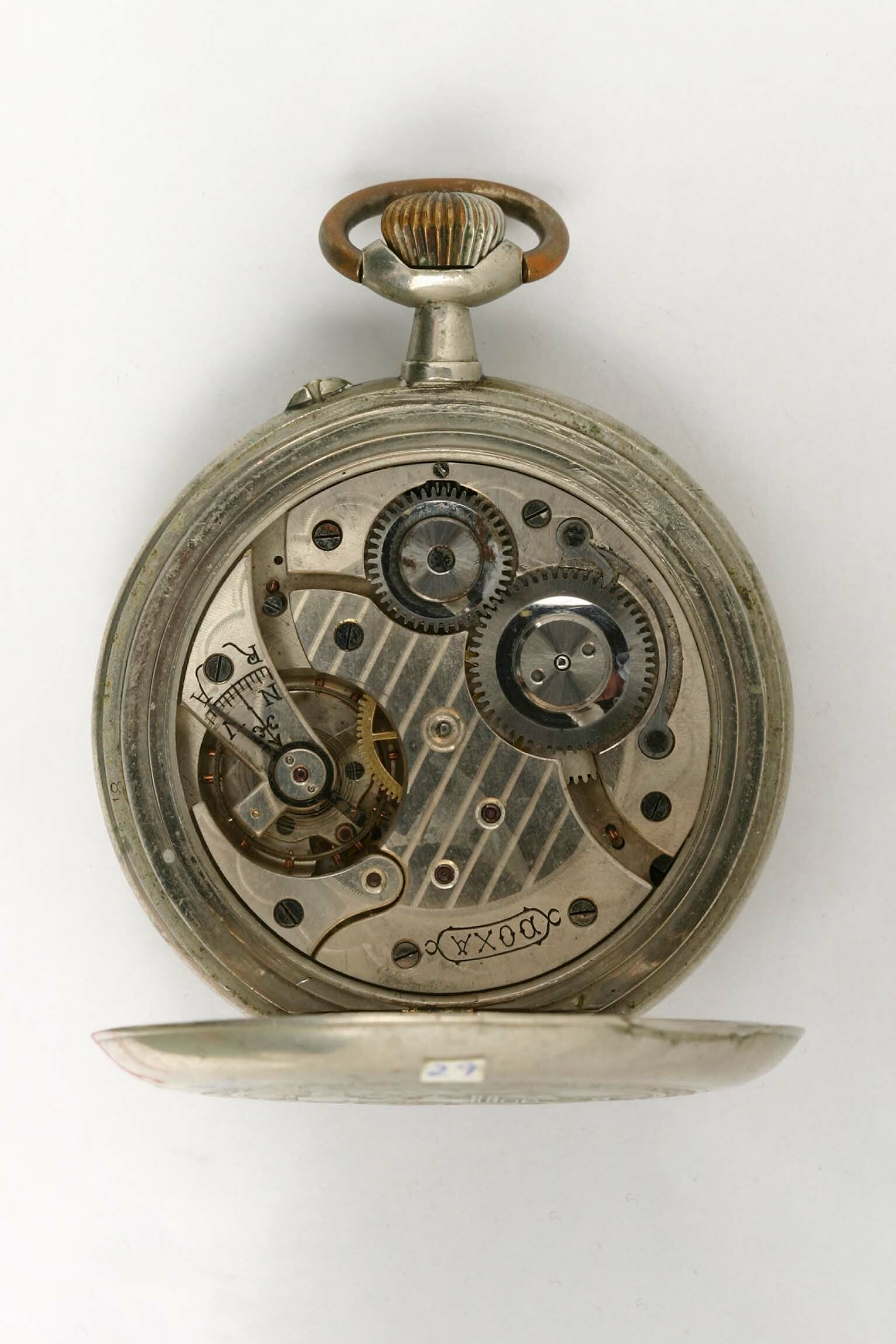
Doxa pocket watch with railway motif, c.1910

=== Early years ===
Doxa was founded in 1889 by Georges Ducommun at the age of 21 in Le Locle, Switzerland. Ducommun had initially become an apprentice at the age of 12 in a manufacturer that cased watch movements, and later started his own watch repair business when he was 20. Doxa began as a maker of dress watches and other timepieces, and over the years, the company grew and branched out into other timekeeping markets. Doxa presented its timepieces at the 1905 World’s Fair in Liège, Belgium, and then at the 1906 World’s Fair in Milan. Ducommun's anti-magnetic timepiece won a gold medal at the latter event.

With Doxa's early relative success, Ducommun soon became one of the first automobile owners in the region. This interest in automobiles led to Ducommun patenting an 8-day watch movement in 1907 for use on the instrument panels of automobiles, aircraft, and ships. Beginning in 1911, Doxa became the supplier for rallye timers and dashboard clocks for Bugatti road and race cars. Soon after, Mercedes-Benz and Peugeot also began equipping Doxa timepieces in their automobile dashboards. From 1924 to 1931, the Bugatti Type 35 was equipped with the Doxa 8-day dashboard clock.

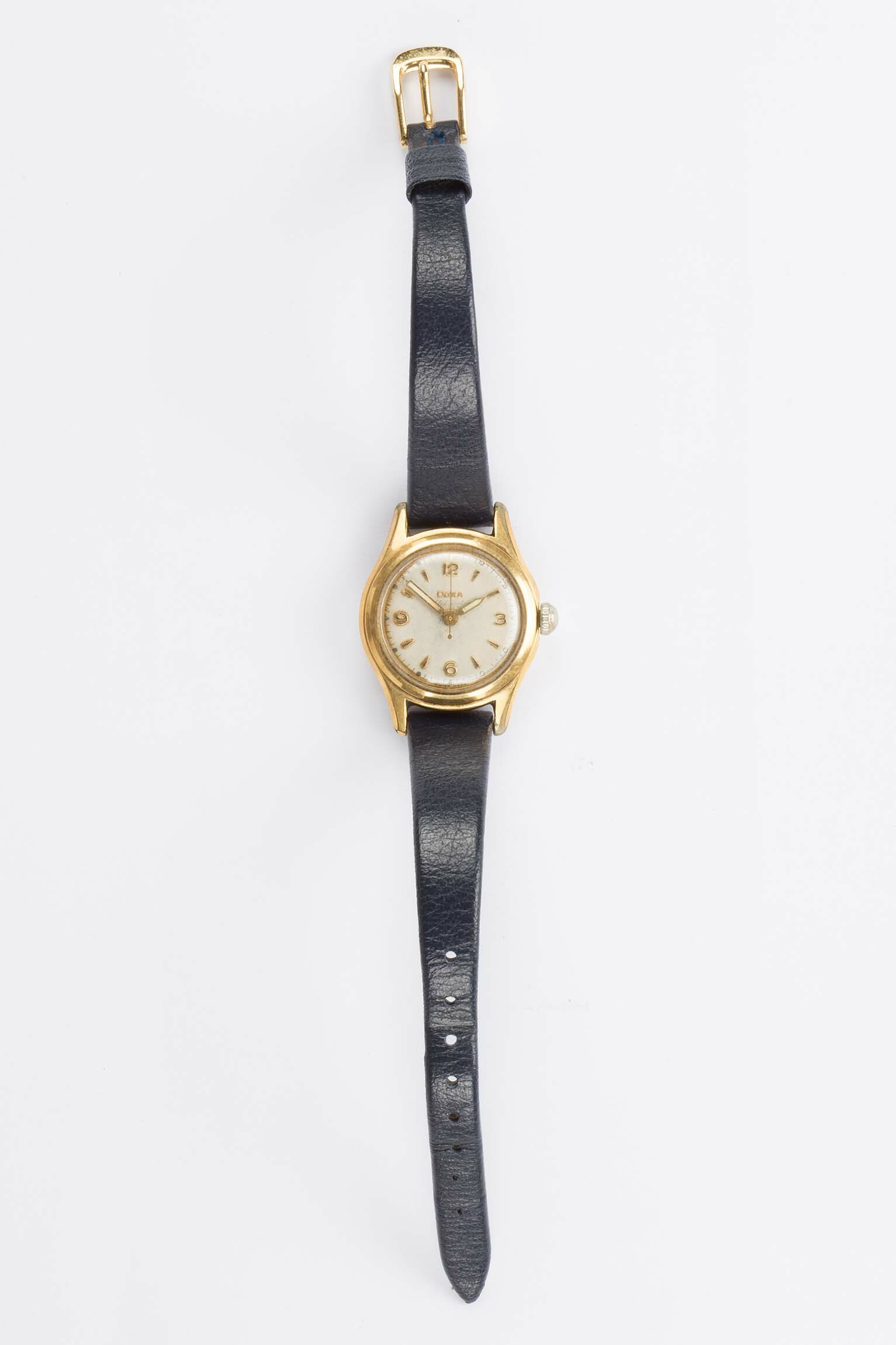
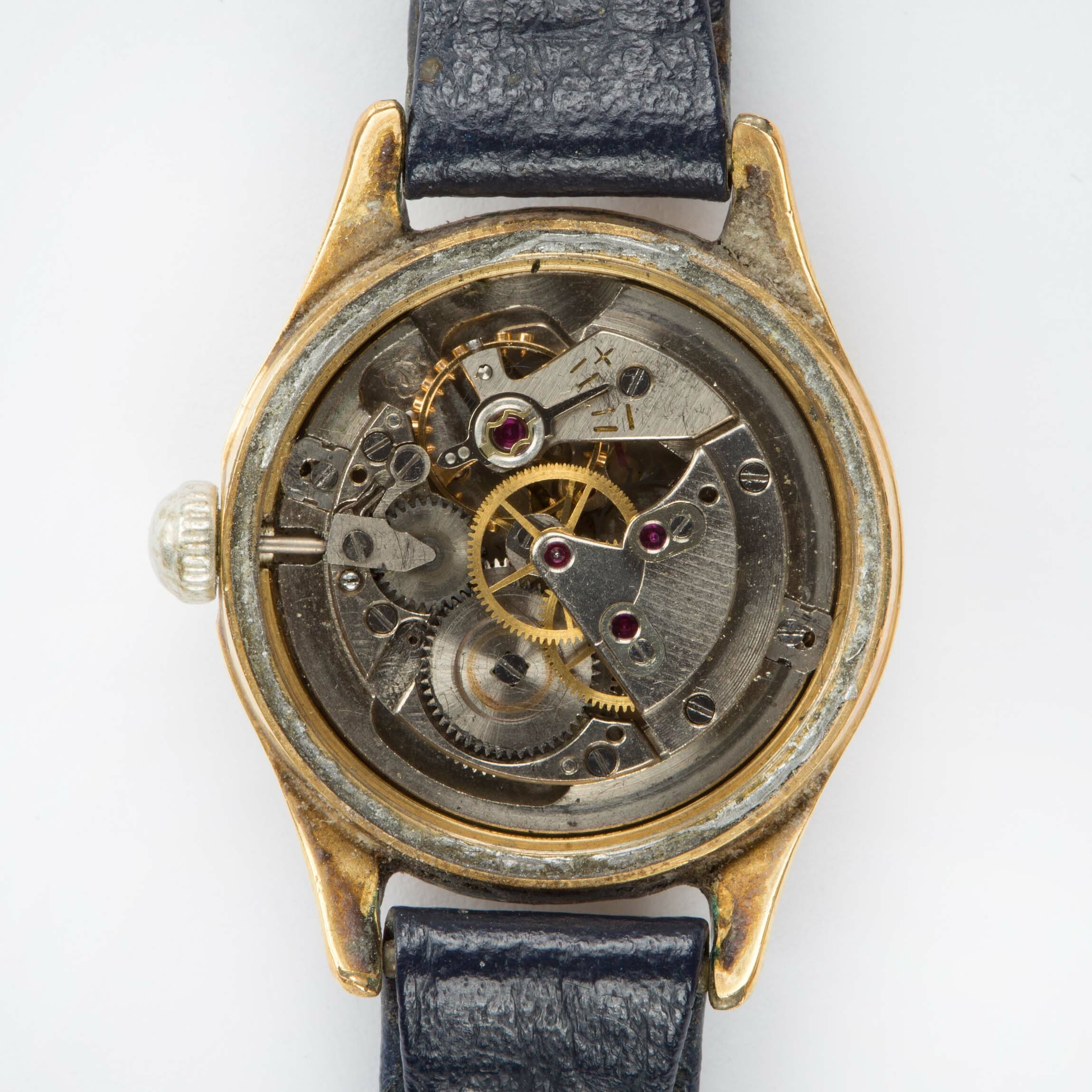
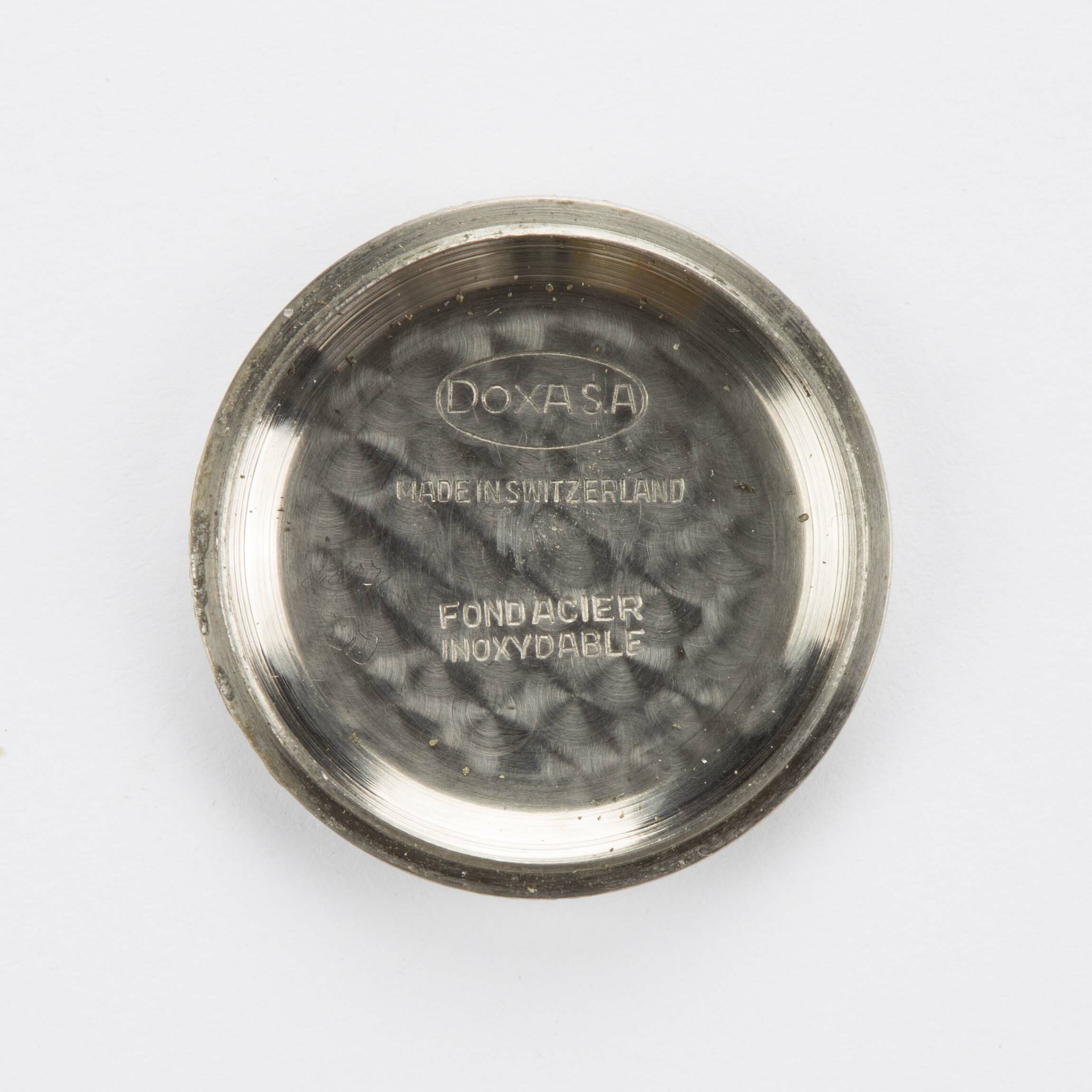
Doxa automatic wrist watch, c.1950

Following Ducommun's death in 1936, leadership of the company passed to his son-in-law, Jacques Nardin, grandson of Ulysse Nardin. Under his direction, Doxa broadened its product range beyond sport-oriented timepieces to include ring watches, alarm watches, and watches featuring jumping seconds complications, among other designs. In 1954, Doxa gifted a gold watch to each player on West Germany's winning football team at the World Cup in Berne, Switzerland.

In 1957, Doxa released the popular "Grafic" line of dress watches featuring minimalist, Bauhaus-inspired design elements in a square case, which quickly became the brand's bestseller. A series of rays dividing the dial, as well as the uncommon placing of the logo at the bottom right with the date window placement in the upper left quadrant of the dial, became signature aspects of the model's design. This asymmetrical branding with crossing lines dividing the dial into quadrants, later became a signature component of Doxa's design language.

=== Introduction of SUB 300T ===
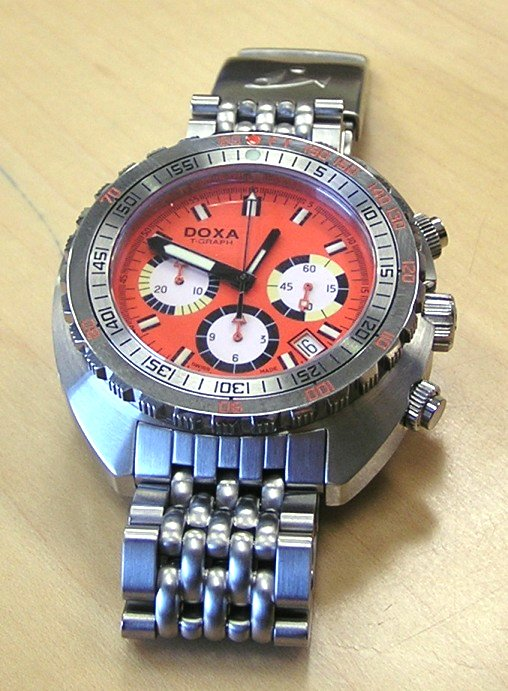
Doxa SUB 600 T-Graph

In the late 1960s Doxa planned to produce a watch to be used while diving. Doxa product manager Urs Eschle partnered with diver Claude Wesly, and their team tested underwater light visibility in Lake Neuchâtel. Tests indicated that an orange face was more visible in murky water. Doxa also consulted with diver Jacques Cousteau, then chairman of U.S. Divers throughout the development of the SUB line of watches. A staff of engineers and professional divers was assembled to create a watch with the required features, which eventually became the Doxa SUB 300. The SUB 300 was debuted at Baselworld in 1967 to showcase its diving innovations in the burgeoning dive watch industry. Between 1968 and 1979 the model was purchased by the Swiss Armed Forces for a newly established unit of combat divers.

The SUB 300 was originally rated to a depth of 300 metres (980 ft), and the 1968 SUB 300T "Conquistador" later increased to 1,200 metres (3,900 ft) as one of the first commercially-available watches with a helium release valve. The naming system of Doxa's SUB lineup has often correlated with the model's depth rating, but in some instances it has deviated, such as with the SUB 300T being rated to 1,200 metres (3,900 ft). The Doxa SUB 300T lineup was later expanded to include a choice of 8 difference dial colors, and a rotating bezel with the official US Navy air dive table for no-decompression dives engraved onto its surface. Other watchmakers then introduced similar bezels. The watch can be used to calculate no decompression times, and dive time. The SUB 300T was also the first commercially available dive watch in 1969 with a helium release valve.

In September 1968, during the SEALAB III missions, the United States Navy officially issued at least 20 Doxa SUB 300T and T-Graph models to the mission's aquanauts. In late 1968, Doxa became part of Synchron S.A.

Soon after the introduction of the SUB 300T, the Swiss watch industry was negatively impacted by the quartz watch crisis of the 1970's. In response a group of Swiss watchmakers, which Doxa joined, was unsuccessfully set up to consolidate resources.

=== Aubry era ===
In 1978, Doxa S.A. was acquired by Aubry Frères S.A.

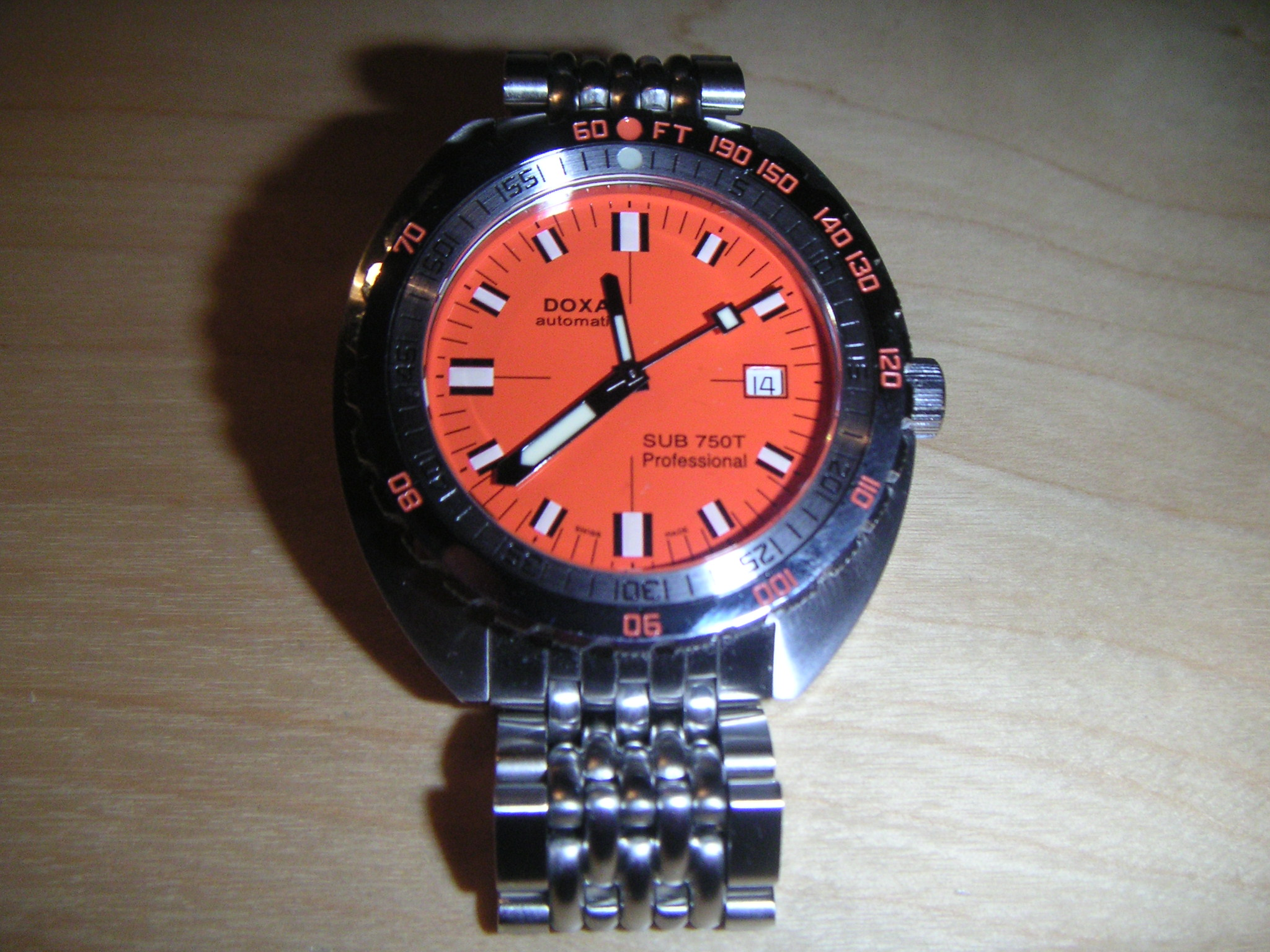
Doxa SUB 750T

During this era, the company released SUB 250T, 300T, 600T, 750T, 1000T models, as well as their first quartz models, to limited success. After 5 years, Doxa ceased operations under Aubry Frères in 1983.

=== Marei era ===
In 1997, the Jenny family of Bienne, Switzerland, acquired Doxa, reviving the brand after a period of dormancy since 1983, becoming a subsidiary of the family's Walca S.A. group. The family, known for their contributions to dive watch innovation through their own brand, Jenny Watches, revitalized Doxa by reintroducing the SUB series in 2000 with input from dive watch historian Rick Marei, focusing on limited-edition models that honored the brand's heritage.

Marei approached Doxa in 1997 after a career working at Microsoft, liquidating his stock options and offering to buy 1,000 watch units for resale if Doxa remade the SUB 300T model. This initial endeavor was successful, and Marei helped pioneer e-commerce direct-to-consumer sales internationally, helping the company find success again selling reproductions of their historic SUB models and expanding their lineup. This sales model was a novel idea in the watch industry at the time, and helped Doxa find large success in markets it had limited involvement in prior, such as the United States. Marei stayed onboard with Doxa for two decades as their general manager and business advisor until 2019, whereafter he departed to instead focus on the Synchron Group, which had formerly been the US distributor of Doxa watches.

Doxa began production of 92 limited edition SUB 1000T watches to support Project AWARE in 2008. In 2012, Doxa introduced the SUB 1200T with Project AWARE, limited to 300 watches, with part of the price of each watch sold going to support Project AWARE.

In 2008, Doxa released the SUB 5000T, which was later updated in 2011 as the SUB 1500T, a model rated to a company-first diving depth of 1,500 metres (4,900 ft). This model features a larger 45x47mm case, 16.25mm thickness, helium release valve, and domed crystal, as Doxa's largest and most water-resistant model.

=== ICE era ===
As coined by Doxa historian Dr. Peter Millar, from 2019 onwards, Doxa has focused on Innovation, Consolidation and Expansion (ICE). In 2019, Doxa hired former MilusMilus and Omega ofSwatch Group executive Jan Edöcs as CEO, while Romeo F. Jenny remains as managing director. The company also celebrated its 130th anniversary in 2019, and released a collection of commemorative watches.

In 2020, Doxa released the SUB 300 Carbon, featuring a forged carbon case and a titanium inner chamber for pressure resistance.

In 2025, at Dubai Watch Week, Doxa announced a limited edition of the model Doxa SUB 300 made from ceramic and sold exclusively through Ahmed Seddiqi boutiques in UAE. The model is limited to 11 pieces.

== In popular culture ==
The character Dirk Pitt by American novelist Clive Cussler is often depicted as wearing a Doxa SUB 300T in Cussler's novels. In a film adaptation, actor Matthew McConaughey played Pitt in the 2005 film Sahara, wearing the SUB 300T Professional.

Actor Robert Redford wore a SUB 300T Sharkhunter in the 1975 film Three Days of the Condor.

== See also ==
- List of watch manufacturers
- Aquastar (watch brand)
