= Robert Sheats =

American Master Diver retired from the United States Navy

TMCM(MDV) Robert (Bob) Sheats
- Born: September 30, 1915
- Died: March 9, 1995 (aged 79); Washington state
- Military career
- Allegiance: United States of America
- Branch: United States Navy
- Service years: 1935–1966
- Rank: TMCM(MDV)
- Awards: Legion of Merit, Prisoner of War Medal

Robert Carlton Sheats (September 30, 1915 – March 9, 1995) was an American Master Diver in the United States Navy. He enlisted in the Navy in 1935 and retired in July 1966.

== Career ==
Dr. Robert Sonnenburg (left) talks over the coming day's schedule with Team Leader Chief Torpedoman Robert Sheats on SEALAB II. Oct. 5, 1965.

=== World War II ===
In 1941, while Sheats was serving as a First Class Diver aboard the submarine tender USS Canopus in the Philippines, the ship was severely damaged by Japanese planes during the Battle of Bataan. After the ship was scuttled, to prevent its capture by enemy forces, Sheats joined the ground forces defending Bataan and Corregidor. On May 6, 1942, Sheats and his men were captured and taken as prisoners of war.

During his imprisonment at Bataan, Sheats and several members of his team were pressed into service as salvage divers by the Japanese to recover silver coins worth over $8 million (in 1942) that had been dumped by a U.S. Navy vessel between Manila Bay and the island of Corregidor when capture of the vessel by the Japanese was inevitable. He ensured that as few coins as possible were actually recovered, both to prevent them from falling into enemy hands and to prolong the project for as long as possible.

Sheats and his men were prisoners of the Japanese for three years and four months in the Philippines and Japan. They survived the Bataan death march and transport to Japan aboard the Noto Maru, one of the infamous Japanese Hell ships. After the Japanese surrender, Sheats and his men were released on September 13, 1945.

=== SEALAB ===
As a Master Diver, Sheats was assigned to the SEALAB I project, during which he ran the divers' topside support system.

Sheats served as team leader of SEALAB II's Team 3, living and working on the ocean floor for fifteen days. Sheats celebrated his fiftieth birthday aboard SEALAB II. During decompression at the end of the project, Sheats experienced a mild case of decompression sickness. He received the Legion of Merit for his SEALAB II service.

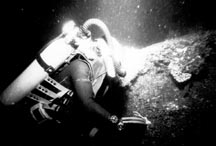
Aquanaut Bob Sheats diving at the 300-foot level of Scripps Canyon during the United States Navy's SEALAB II project in 1965.

Due to concerns about safety and the new management structure, Sheats declined to participate in the SEALAB III project, during which civilian aquanaut Berry L. Cannon was killed. He later worked as a consultant in Washington state until his death in 1995.

== Publications ==
- Sheats, Robert (1998). One Man's War: Diving as a Guest of the Emperor 1942. Best Publishing Company. ISBN 0941332608.
