= George F. Bond =

US Navy physician and diving medicine and saturation diving researcher

George Foote Bond, MD
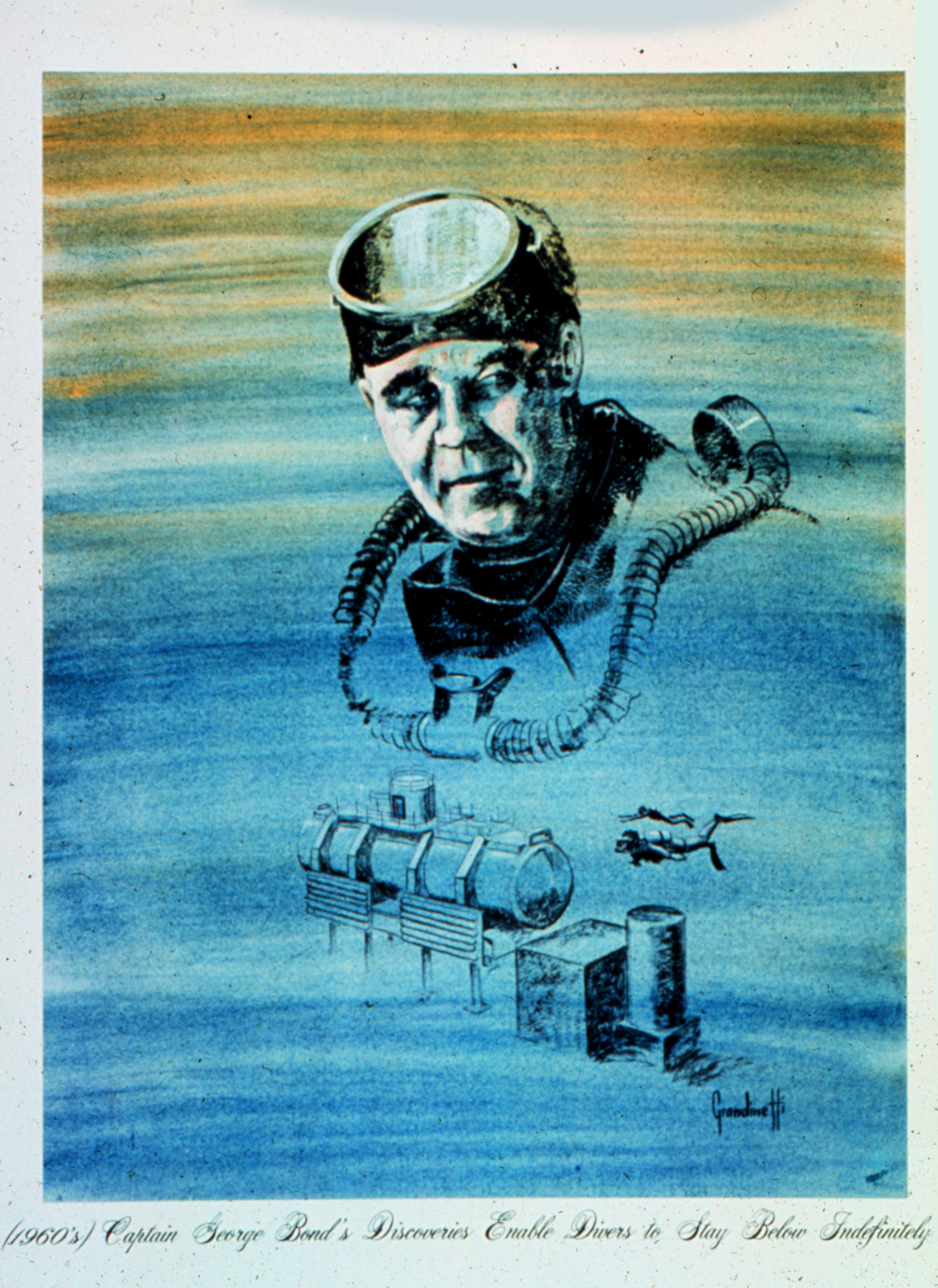
- NOAA drawing of Dr. Bond and the SEALAB habitat. (1960s) Captain George Bond's Discoveries Enable Divers to Stay Below Indefinitely
- Born: November 14, 1915; Willoughby, Ohio, US
- Died: January 3, 1983 (aged 67); Bat Cave, North Carolina, US
- Military career
- Allegiance: United States of America
- Branch: United States Navy
- Service years: 1953–1978
- Rank: Captain
- Nickname: Papa Topside
- Awards: Navy Commendation Medal, Legion of Merit with two gold stars

Captain George Foote Bond (November 14, 1915 – January 3, 1983) was a United States Navy physician who was known as a leader in the field of undersea and hyperbaric medicine and the "Father of Saturation Diving".

While serving as Officer-in-Charge at the Naval Medical Research Laboratory in Groton, Connecticut, he conducted his earliest experiments into saturation diving techniques. In 1957, Bond began the Genesis project to prove that humans could in fact withstand prolonged exposure to different breathing gases and increased environmental pressures. Once saturation is achieved, the amount of time needed for decompression depends only on the depth and gases breathed. This was the beginning of saturation diving and the US Navy's Man-in-the-Sea Program.

The first two phases of Project Genesis involved exposing animals to saturation in various breathing gases. In 1962, interest in helium-oxygen atmospheres for crewed space flights made Phase C possible. Phase C involved saturation of three subjects at one atmosphere (surface) in a 21.6% oxygen, 4% nitrogen, and 74.4% helium environment for six days. In phase D experiments at the United States Navy Experimental Diving Unit in 1963, the subjects performed the world's first saturation dive at a depth of 100 feet of seawater (fsw) in a 7% oxygen, 7% nitrogen, and 86% helium environment for 6 days. In phase E trials in 1963 divers were saturated for 12 days at 198 fsw breathing 3.9% oxygen, 6.5% nitrogen and 89.6% helium. A 27-hour linear ascent was made from saturation.

"Papa Topside" Bond initiated and served as the Senior Medical Officer and principal investigator of the US Navy SEALAB program. SEALAB I was lowered off the coast of Bermuda in 1964 to a depth of 192 fsw below the sea's surface. The experiment was halted after 11 days due to an approaching tropical storm. SEALAB I proved that saturation diving in the open ocean was a viable means for expanding our ability to live and work in the sea. The experiment also provided engineering solutions to habitat placement, habitat umbilicals, humidity, and helium speech descrambling. SEALAB II was launched off the coast of California in 1965 to assess the feasibility of utilizing saturation techniques and tools to accomplish a variety of tasks that would be difficult or impossible to accomplish by repeated dives from the surface. In addition to physiological testing, the divers tested new tools, methods of salvage, and an electrically heated drysuit. SEALAB III was placed in water three times as deep to test new salvage techniques and for oceanographic and fishery studies. On February 15, 1969, SEALAB III was lowered to 610 fsw (185 m), off San Clemente Island, California. The habitat soon began to leak and six divers were sent to repair it, but they were unsuccessful. During the second attempt, aquanaut Berry L. Cannon died, and the program came to a halt.

== Early life ==
George Foote Bond was born November 14, 1915, in Willoughby, Ohio, to Robert and Louise Foot Bond. Bond received a Bachelor and Master of Arts from the University of Florida in 1939. While a student at UF, he became a member of the Sigma Nu fraternity. He then attended medical school at McGill University where he completed his medical training in surgery in 1945. Bond performed his internship at the Memorial Hospital in Charlotte, North Carolina. In 1946, Bond established a rural medical practice in Bat Cave, North Carolina. Seeing a need in the community, Bond established the Valley Clinic and Hospital in 1948. Bond was recognized by the community as "Doctor of the Year" in 1953. The people of the area showed their affection towards Bond when he appeared on the national television show This Is Your Life on June 22, 1955.

== Navy career ==
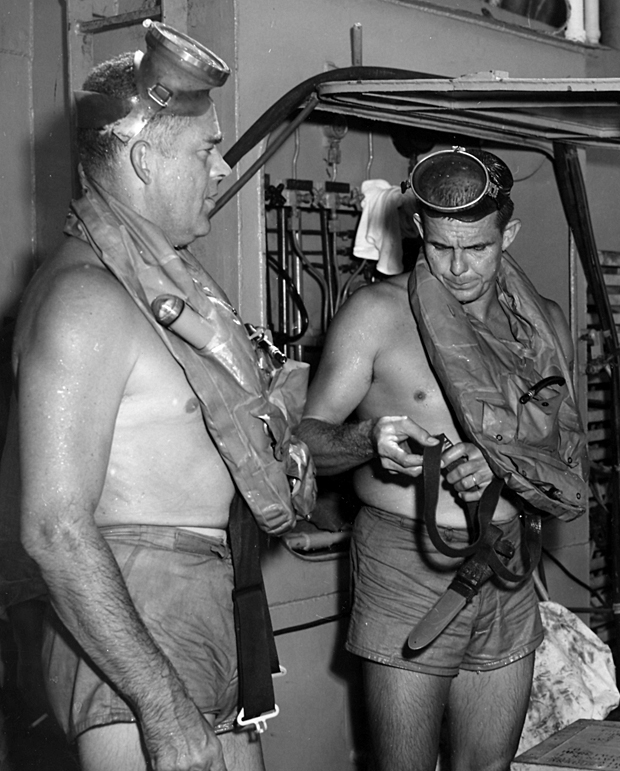
Dr. George Bond and Chief Engineman Cyril Tuckfield following record buoyant ascent in 1959

Bond entered active Navy service in 1953. Soon after he qualified as a Diving and Submarine Medical Officer and served as Squadron Medical Officer from 1954 to 1958. Later that year, Bond transferred to the Naval Medical Research Laboratory in Groton, Connecticut, where he served as the Officer-in-Charge until 1964. It was during this time that Bond conducted his earliest experiments into saturation diving techniques.

On October 2, 1959, approximately 15 miles southwest of Key West, Commander Bond and Chief Engineman Cyril Tuckfield safely completed a 52-second, 302-foot buoyant ascent from the forward escape trunk of the U.S. Navy submarine USS Archerfish. Both men received the Legion of Merit in 1960 for establishing the feasibility of deep submarine escape by locking out.

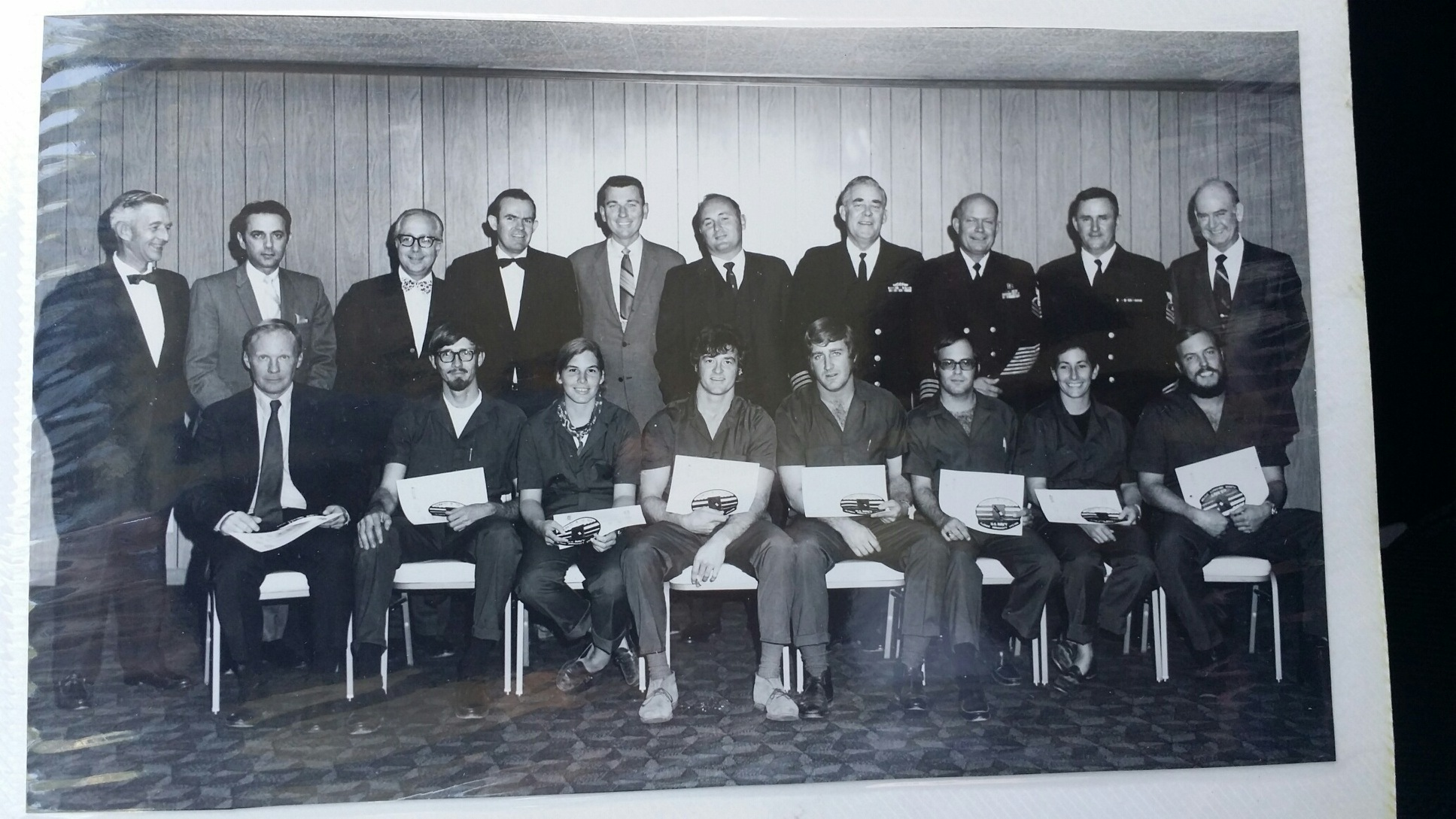
Anne Rudloe third from left in United States Naval base in Panama City in underwater research and diving techniques 1960s. In the back row, fourth from the right, is Dr. (Captain) George F. Bond, senior medical officer and principal investigator for the Sealab I and Sealab II experiments in the mid-1960s.

=== Project Genesis ===
Albert R. Behnke proposed the idea of exposing humans to increased ambient pressures long enough for the blood and tissues to become saturated with inert gases in 1942. In 1957, Bond began the Genesis project proving that humans could in fact withstand prolonged exposure to different breathing gases and increased environmental pressures. Once saturation is achieved, the amount of time needed for decompression depends on the depth and gases breathed. This was the beginning of saturation diving and the US Navy's Man-in-the-Sea Program.

Genesis was conducted in phases. In 1957 and 1958, the first two phases (A and B) involved exposing animals to saturation in various breathing gases. The experiments are summarized in the table below:

Genesis Project Phases A and B (Note: table adapted from Miller and Koblick)
Phase	Animal	Depth	Duration	Breathing Gas	Results
A1	Wistar rats	198 fsw (Note: fsw = feet of sea water; 200 fsw represents an ambient pressure of approximately 7 atmospheres absolute (ATA) or 700 kPa)	35 hours	Air	Rats all died, attributed to oxygen toxicity
A2	Wistar rats	198 fsw	14 days	3% Oxygen/ 97% Nitrogen	15 of 16 animals survived, lung lesions found in survivors
A3	Wistar rats	1.5 ATA (Note: ATA = atmospheres absolute; an ambient pressure of 1.5 ATA (150 kPa) represents approximately 17 feet of sea water)	35 hours	Oxygen	Rats all died
B1	Wistar rats	1 ATA	16 days	20% Oxygen/ 80% Helium	All survived
B2	Wistar rats	200 fsw	14 days	3% Oxygen/ 97% Helium	All survived
B3	Wistar rats, Goat, Squirrel monkey	200 fsw	14 days	3% Oxygen/ 97% Helium	All survived

Once the animal work was completed, Bond proposed offering "the opportunity for development of ecological systems which would permit man, as a free agent, to live and work to depths at 600 feet, and for periods in excess of 30 days." This proposal was rejected but in 1962, interest in helium-oxygen atmospheres for crewed space flights made Phase C possible.

Fred Korth was the Secretary of the Navy in 1962 and authorized Phase C involving saturation of three subjects at one atmosphere (surface) in a 21.6% oxygen, 4% nitrogen, and 74.4% helium environment for six days. The divers for this trial were Lieutenants John C. Bull, Jr., Albert P. Fisher, Jr., and Chief Quartermaster Robert A. Barth. Physiologically, the subjects showed no changes though difficulty controlling their body temperature as well as changes in their speech from the helium were noted.

Effect of helium on a human voice
The effect of helium on a human voice

Phase D experiments were conducted at the United States Navy Experimental Diving Unit in 1963. The subjects for these trials were Robert A. Barth, Sanders W. Manning, and Raymond R. Lavois. The subjects performed the world's first saturation dive at a depth of 100 feet of seawater (fsw) in a 7% oxygen, 7% nitrogen, and 86% helium environment for 6 days. Light exercise and underwater swimming were performed periodically in the "wet pot" (a water-filled hyperbaric chamber). Again the difficulty controlling their body temperature was a concern and the helium speech became worse at the greater environmental pressure.

Bond returned the team to the Naval Medical Research Laboratory for the Phase E trials in 1963. The divers were John C. Bull, Jr., Robert A. Barth, and Sanders W. Manning. They were saturated for 12 days at 198 fsw breathing 3.9% oxygen, 6.5% nitrogen and 89.6% helium. The temperature and voice communications problems continued with communications with the surface being virtually impossible. A 27-hour linear ascent was made from saturation.

Bond summarized the Genesis experiments:

As a result of some six years of animal and human studies involving closed ecological systems, elevated pressures, and synthetic atmospheres, the stage has been set for operational application of the work. It would now appear that we can safely station men at any point on the submerged continental shelf, with a reasonable expectancy of useful performance for prolonged periods of time.

The Genesis chamber is still in use as a research facility today at the Naval Submarine Medical Research Laboratory.

=== SEALAB ===
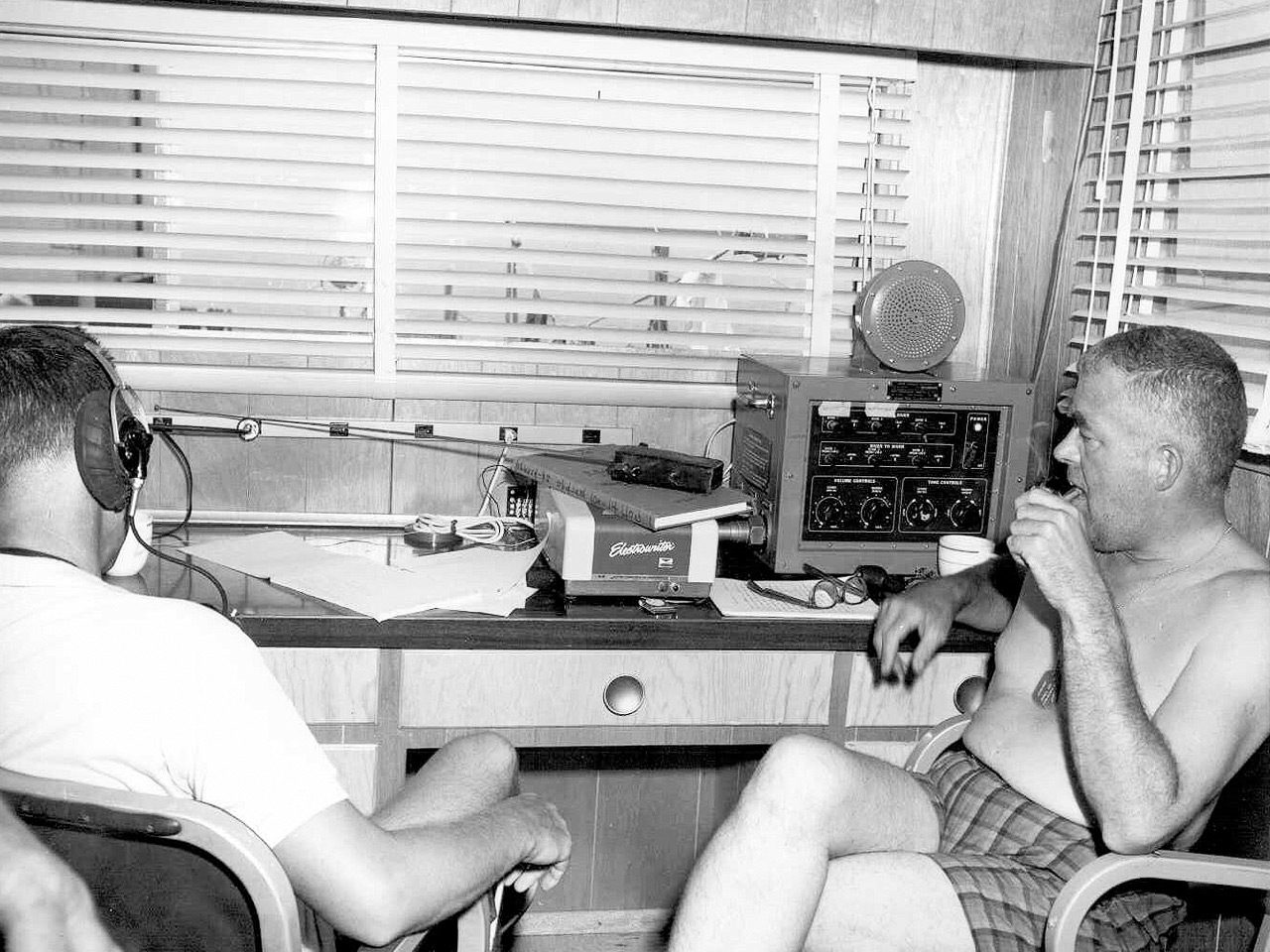
Drs. Walter Mazzone and George Bond inside the communications center of SEALAB I

Following the success of the Genesis Project, Edwin Link initiated his Man-in-the-Sea dives followed shortly thereafter by Cousteau and his Conshelf experiments. "Papa Topside" Bond initiated and served as the Senior Medical Officer and principal investigator of the US Navy SEALAB program.

SEALAB I was lowered off the coast of Bermuda in 1964 to a depth of 192 fsw below the sea's surface. It was constructed from two converted floats and held in place with axles from railroad cars. Bond and Captain Walter Mazzone inspected the habitat prior to the beginning of the project. The experiment involved four divers (LCDR Robert Thompson, MC; Gunners Mate First Class Lester Anderson, Chief Quartermaster Robert A. Barth, and Chief Hospital Corpsman Sanders Manning), who were to stay submerged for three weeks. The experiment was halted after 11 days due to an approaching tropical storm. SEALAB I proved that saturation diving in the open ocean was a viable means for expanding our ability to live and work in the sea. The experiment also provided engineering solutions to habitat placement, habitat umbilicals, humidity, and helium speech descrambling.

SEALAB II was launched in 1965 to assess the feasibility of utilizing saturation techniques and tools "to remain deep beneath the ocean surface indefinitely and accomplish a variety of tasks that would be difficult or impossible to accomplish by repeated dives from the surface." It was placed in the La Jolla Canyon off the coast of California, at a depth of 205 fsw. On August 28, 1965, the first of three teams of divers moved into what became known as the "Tilton Hilton" (Tiltin' Hilton, because of the slope of the landing site). Unlike SEALAB I, it also included hot showers and refrigeration. Each team spent 15 days in the habitat, but aquanaut/astronaut Scott Carpenter remained below for a record 30 days. In addition to physiological testing, the divers tested new tools, methods of salvage, and an electrically heated drysuit. One case of decompression sickness was treated by Dr. Bond.

SEALAB III used a refurbished SEALAB II habitat, but was placed in water three times as deep. Five teams of nine divers were scheduled to spend 12 days each in the habitat, testing new salvage techniques and conducting oceanographic and fishery studies. According to John Piña Craven, the U.S. Navy's head of the Deep Submergence Systems Project of which SEALAB was a part, SEALAB III "was plagued with strange failures at the very start of operations". On February 15, 1969, SEALAB III was lowered to 610 fsw (185 m), off San Clemente Island, California. The habitat soon began to leak and six divers were sent to repair it, but they were unsuccessful. Tragically, during the second attempt, aquanaut Berry L. Cannon died. The SEALAB program came to a halt, and although the habitat was retrieved, it was eventually scrapped. Aspects of the research continued but no new habitats were built.

== Memberships, awards, and recognition ==
Bond was decorated with a Navy Commendation Medal for "heroic, professional, and scientific achievement" while he was the Medical Officer for Submarine Squadron One from 1954 to 1956. The Legion of Merit was awarded in 1960 for establishing the feasibility of deep submarine escape by locking out of a submarine at a depth of 302 fsw with two additional gold stars being earned for his work with SEALAB I (1964) and SEALAB II (1965).

The US Navy dedicated the new Ocean Simulation Facility at the United States Navy Experimental Diving Unit in honor of Dr. Bond in 1974.

Bond served on the first Board of Advisors for the National Association of Underwater Instructors.

Bond's leadership helped establish the Man-In-The-Sea Museum in 1977 with a goal to preserve the history of undersea exploration.

== Death ==
Bond died on January 3, 1983. He is buried in Bat Cave, North Carolina.

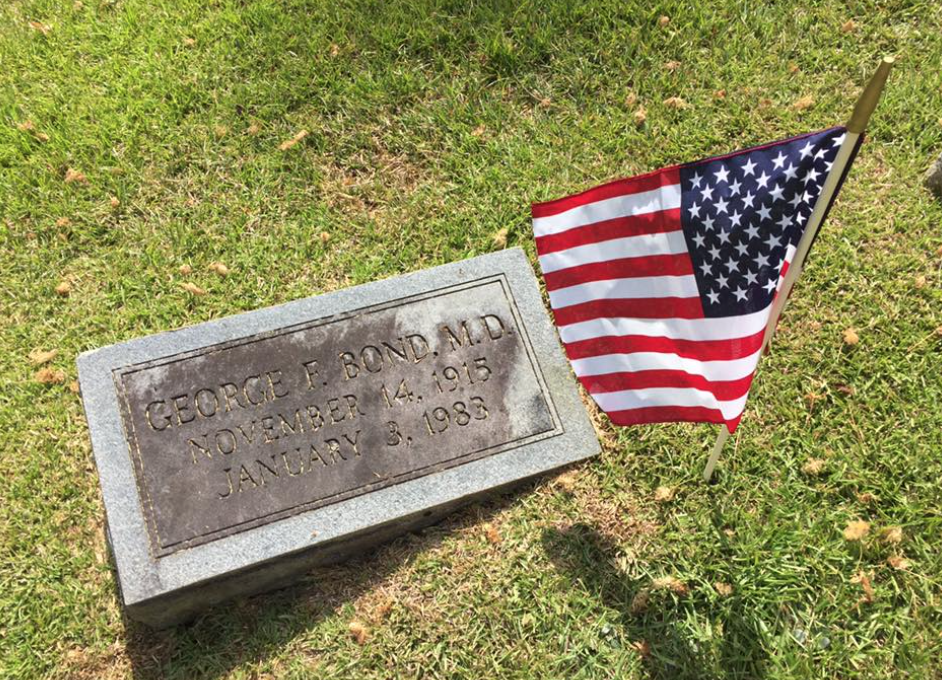
Grave site, Bat Cave, NC

== Bibliography ==
- Barth, Bob (2000). Sea Dwellers: The Humor, Drama and Tragedy of the U.S. Navy SEALAB Programs. Houston, Texas: Doyle Publishing Company. ISBN 0-9653359-3-3. LCCN 99-32021.
- Bond, George F.; Siiteri, Helen A. (1993). Papa Topside: The Sealab Chronicles of Capt. George F. Bond, USN. Annapolis, MD: US Naval Institute Press. ISBN 1-55750-795-3.
- Bunton, William J. (2000). Death of an Aquanaut. Flagstaff, Arizona: Best Publishing Company. ISBN 0-941332-81-0. LCCN 99-66260.
- Hellwarth, Ben (2012). Sealab: America's Forgotten Quest to Live and Work on the Ocean Floor. New York: Simon & Schuster. ISBN 978-0-7432-4745-0. LCCN 2011015725.
