= Robert A. Barth =

American quartermaster and aquanaut (1930–2020)

Robert August Barth
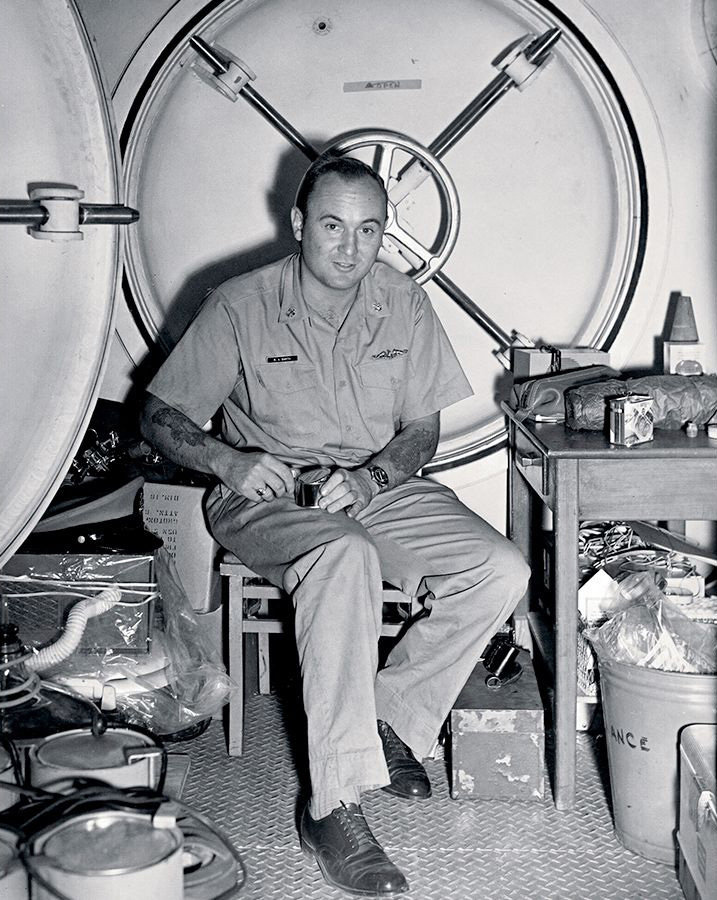
- Robert A. Barth in 1963.
- Born: August 28, 1930; Manila, Philippines
- Died: March 26, 2020 (aged 89); Panama City, Florida
- Military career
- Allegiance: United States of America
- Branch: United States Navy
- Service years: 1947–1970
- Rank: Chief Quartermaster USN
- Nickname: Bob Barth

Robert August Barth (August 28, 1930 – March 26, 2020) was a United States Navy Chief Quartermaster, pioneering aquanaut and professional diver. He was the only diver to participate in all U.S. Navy SEALAB missions led by George F. Bond. Barth is considered to be the father of the Rolex Sea Dweller. In 1967, he developed the idea for the helium release valve which was patented by Rolex on November 6, 1967.

== Early life ==
Barth was born in Manila, Philippines on August 28, 1930. His father Robert was a U.S. Army officer on the staff of General Douglas MacArthur. When Barth was ten years old, his parents divorced and he remained in Manila with his mother. Before the attack on Pearl Harbor, Barth, together with other American children and families, was evacuated from the Philippines to return to the safety of mainland American soil. After arriving in San Francisco, young Barth lived with his father for a while and moved with him around the country. Barth's mother had remarried to Sam Knowles, an area manager for International Harvester, and they remained in the Philippines with their jobs. When the Japanese invaded the Philippines, the couple was taken prisoner and landed in the notorious Los Baños Prison Camp. After the war, the couple returned to the United States. Upon their return, Barth moved to his mother and stepfather in Chicago before setting off with them to Durban, South Africa, where Sam Knowles had been assigned by International Harvester. Barth was not happy at his new home. When he turned seventeen and could legally leave, he returned to the United States on a cargo ship named Westward Ho where he worked as an ordinary seaman to pay for the trip. Upon arrival in the U.S. in November 1947, Barth went straight to Chicago to enroll in the U.S. Navy.

== Navy career ==
Barth served on several ships and submarines, including USS Boxer (CV-21), USS Guavina, and USS Quillback (SS-424). He reached the rank of Chief Quartermaster, a navigational expert who assists the ship's chief navigator, keeps navigational charts and equipment in working order, and can serve as helmsman if called upon. During his service he was impressed with divers and soon became a diver himself. In January 1960, Barth was assigned to the Escape Training Tank at the Naval Submarine Base New London to become an instructor. At the time, George F. Bond was head of the base's Medical Research Laboratory and his work brought him frequently to the escape tank, where Barth got to know and admire Bond and his ground-breaking ideas of saturation diving. In 1962, Barth started working with Bond on Project Genesis, a series of on-shore animal and human tests to prove Bond's theories that humans could be exposed for a prolonged period of time to different breathing gases and increased environmental pressures. On April 10, 1963, the USS Thresher (SSN-593), a state-of-the-art nuclear submarine, sank in deep Atlantic waters, killing all 129 men on board. Barth had trained the crew of the Thresher just a few weeks earlier. He lost five shipmates in the accident. The tragic loss of the Thresher led to more funding for Bond's ideas as the Navy wanted to further their diving and salvage capabilities. In mid-August 1963, Barth, John Bull and Sanders W. Manning conducted the final Genesis test. They were saturated for 12 days at 198 fsw breathing 3.9% oxygen, 6.5% nitrogen and 89.6% helium.

== SEALAB ==
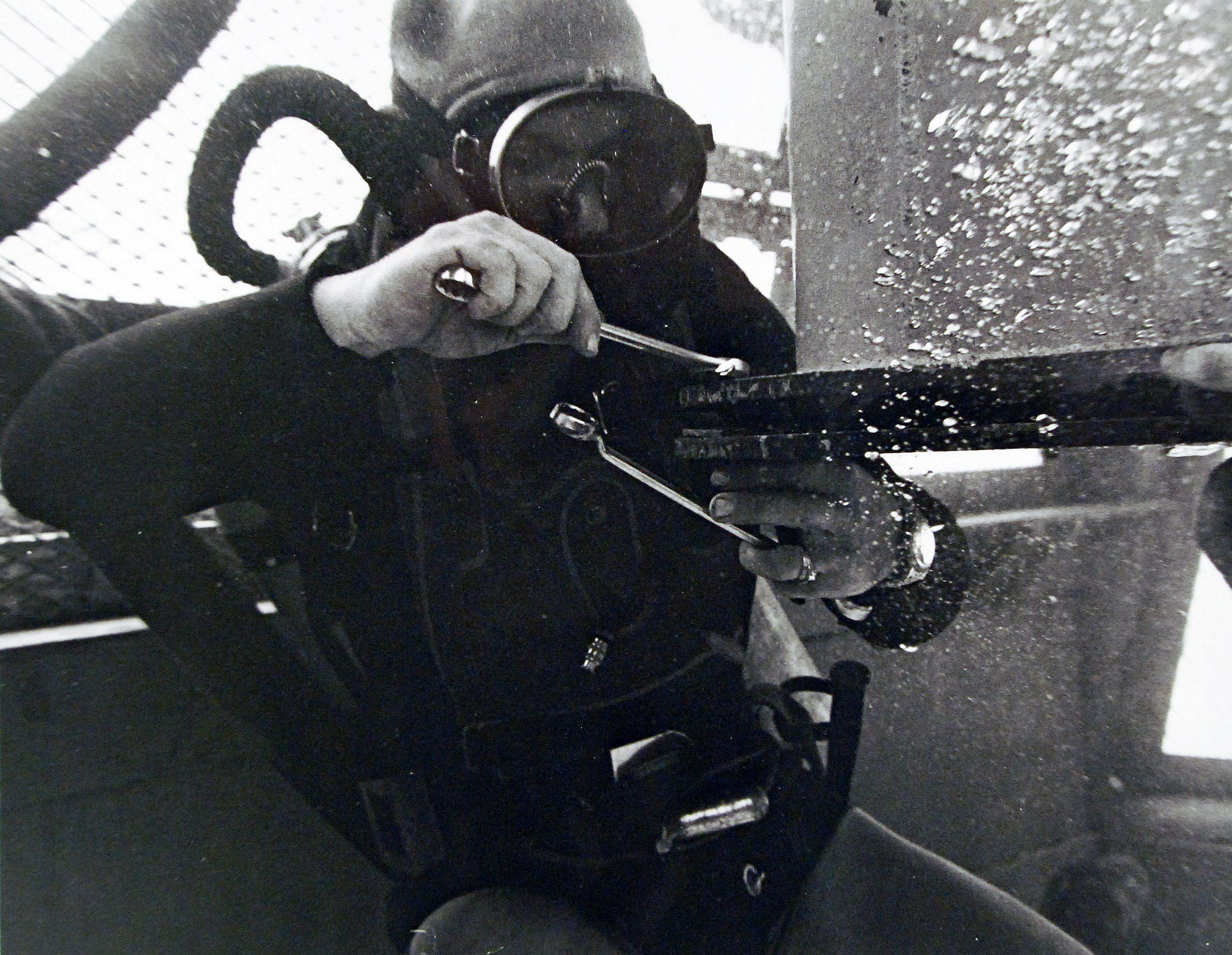
Barth securing the entry hatch of SEALAB I.

Following the success of Genesis, the Navy greenlighted Bond's idea of an underwater habitat to prove that saturation diving in the open ocean was viable for extended periods.

SEALAB I was lowered off the coast of Bermuda on July 20, 1964, to a depth of 192 feet (59 m) below the ocean surface. It was constructed from two converted floats and held in place with axles from railroad cars. Besides Bob Barth, the experiment involved three other divers: Robert Thompson, Lester Anderson, and Sanders W. Manning. The astronaut and second American to orbit the Earth, Scott Carpenter, was scheduled to be the fifth aquanaut in the habitat. Carpenter was trained by Barth. Shortly before the experiment took place, Carpenter had a scooter accident on Bermuda and broke a few bones. The crash ruined his chances of making the dive. The experiment was halted after 11 days due to an approaching tropical storm. SEALAB I proved that saturation diving in the open ocean was a viable means for expanding humans' ability to live and work in the sea. The experiment also provided engineering solutions for habitat placement, habitat umbilicals, humidity, and helium speech descrambling.

SEALAB II was launched in 1965 to assess the feasibility of utilizing saturation techniques and tools "to remain deep beneath the ocean surface indefinitely and accomplish a variety of tasks that would be difficult or impossible to accomplish by repeated dives from the surface." It was placed in the La Jolla Canyon off the coast of California, at a depth of 205 feet (62 m). On August 28, 1965, the first of three teams of divers moved into what became known as the "Tilton Hilton" (Tiltin' Hilton, because of the slope of the landing site). Unlike SEALAB I, it also included hot showers and refrigeration. Each team spent 15 days in the habitat, but aquanaut/astronaut Scott Carpenter remained below for a record 30 days. Bob Barth was part of the second team. In addition to physiological testing, the divers tested new tools, methods of salvage, and an electrically heated drysuit.

SEALAB III used a refurbished SEALAB II habitat, but was placed in water three times as deep. Five teams of nine divers were scheduled to spend 12 days each in the habitat, testing new salvage techniques and conducting oceanographic and fishery studies. Initially scheduled for late 1967, the experiment had to be postponed due to a series of technical failures. On February 15, 1969, SEALAB III was lowered to 610 feet (186 m), off San Clemente Island, California. The habitat soon began to leak helium. If it ran out of gas, the habitat could be destroyed. A four-man team consisting of Bob Barth, Berry L. Cannon, John Reaves and Richard Blackburn was sent down to plug the leaks and prepare the habitat for the arrival of the first team. During their two-hour-long descent to the habitat, the four aquanauts had to endure chilling temperatures in the unheated personnel transport capsule. Upon arrival at the bottom, John Reaves and Richard Blackburn remained in the diving bell as a back-up while Bob Barth and Berry L. Cannon left to try and open the habitat's hatch, a task which proved impossible. Drained of their energy, the four men returned to the surface. The same team was sent down again a few hours later. During the second attempt, Bob Barth found his partner Berry Cannon in trouble on the ocean floor. Cannon's mouth piece had come loose and he was convulsing. Barth tried to force his emergency buddy regulator into Cannon's mouth but due to the convulsions, his mouth was shut tight. About to pass out himself, Barth headed for the diving bell to seek help from the back-up team. They pulled Cannon back into the diving bell and made their way to the surface, but Berry L. Cannon had already died. Cannon's death was caused by an empty carbon dioxide scrubber in his breathing device. The SEALAB program came to a halt, and although the habitat was retrieved, it was eventually scrapped. Aspects of the research continued but no new habitats were built.

== Helium release valve ==
In 1967, Barth met a diver named T. Walker Lloyd at a dive trade show in New York. Lloyd was an archeological diver mostly diving on compressed air. He was preparing for an archaeological excavation off the coast of Bodrum, Turkey led by underwater archeologist Dr. George Bass. During their conversation about saturation diving, Barth mentioned a fascinating phenomenon Lloyd had never heard of. When saturation divers went through decompression after weeks at depth, their watches literally exploded, the reason being that helium atoms were so tiny, they were able to penetrate the watch cases during prolonged exposure. Once saturation divers started the process of decompression, the helium inside the watches could not escape fast enough and became trapped. The internal pressure – now much higher than the steadily decreasing pressure in the decompression chamber – caused the weakest part of the watches, the crystals, to pop off. The divers learned quickly how to deal with this issue. Before decompression, they simply unscrewed their crowns. If they forgot, however, their watches were damaged. An automatic solution was needed, and Barth had already figured out what to do. His idea was simple yet brilliant: To install a tiny one-way helium release valve to allow accumulated helium gas to exit the watch in a controlled fashion. After this encounter, Lloyd seized the moment and shared the acquired knowledge with Rolex. René-Paul Jeanneret, a member of the Rolex board and a passionate diver himself, was fascinated by Lloyd's knowledge on saturation diving, so much so, he offered him a job as Oceanographic Consultant for Rolex in order to keep in touch with the latest developments. Lloyd's role in the development of the valve was mentioned in one of Rolex's oldest Sea-Dweller advertisements.

== Civilian life ==
Barth retired from active duty on May 1, 1970, but soon went back to work for the Navy as a civil servant in Panama City, Florida during the construction of the "Ocean Simulation Facility", whose 55,000-gallon centerpiece was one of the largest hyperbaric chambers ever built. In 1972, Barth went to work for Henri Delauze and his French diving company, Comex, in Dubai. After about a year, Barth started his own diving company, called Hydrospace, which he ran for several years before selling the business. Subsequently, he worked in marketing for Taylor Diving & Salvage Co., a major U.S. diving firm based in New Orleans. In the meantime, Panama City had become the new home of the Experimental Diving Unit and Barth returned to work for the Navy in several civilian roles until his retirement in 2005.

== Death ==
Barth died on March 26, 2020, from complications of Parkinson's disease, at his home in Panama City, Florida.

== Bibliography ==
- Barth, Bob (2000). Sea Dwellers: The Humor, Drama and Tragedy of the U.S. Navy SEALAB Programs. Houston, Texas: Doyle Publishing Company. ISBN 0-9653359-3-3. LCCN 99-32021.
- Bond, George F.; Siiteri, Helen A. (1993). Papa Topside: The Sealab Chronicles of Capt. George F. Bond, USN. Annapolis, MD: US Naval Institute Press. ISBN 1-55750-795-3.
- Bunton, William J. (2000). Death of an Aquanaut. Flagstaff, Arizona: Best Publishing Company. ISBN 0-941332-81-0. LCCN 99-66260.
- Hellwarth, Ben (2012). Sealab: America's Forgotten Quest to Live and Work on the Ocean Floor. New York: Simon & Schuster. ISBN 978-0-7432-4745-0. LCCN 2011015725.
- Rawlinson, Jonathan (1988). From Space to the Seabed. Vero Beach, Florida: Rourke Enterprises, Inc. ISBN 0-86592-872-X. LCCN 88-15815. (For children.)
