= John P. Craven =

American scientist

- Born: October 30, 1924; Brooklyn, New York, US
- Died: February 12, 2015 (aged 90); Hawaii, US
- Education: Cornell University (BA) Caltech (M.S.), Iowa (PhD); George Washington Law (JD)
- Spouse: Dorothy Drakesmith
- Military career
- Allegiance: American
- Branch: Navy
- Awards: Defense Distinguished Civilian Service Award Navy Distinguished Civilian Service Award

John Piña Craven (October 30, 1924 – February 12, 2015) was an American scientist who was known for his involvement with Bayesian search theory and the recovery of lost objects at sea. He was Chief Scientist of the Special Projects Office of the United States Navy.

== Biography ==
John Piña Craven was born in Brooklyn, New York, in 1924. He held a Bachelor of Arts degree from Cornell University, a Master of Science degree from the California Institute of Technology, a Ph.D. from the University of Iowa, and a Juris Doctor degree from the National Law Center of the George Washington University.

He met his wife, Dorothy Drakesmith, while attending the University of Iowa.

Craven had 40 years of experience in the innovation, development, design, construction, and operational deployment of major oceanic systems. As a boy, John Piña Craven studied ocean technology at the Brooklyn Technical High School, and he became familiar with the ocean on the beaches of Long Island and the waterfront of New York City.

During World War II, Craven served as an enlisted man on the USS New Mexico (BB-40). In 1944, Craven was selected for the navy's V-12 program for officer trainees. From this, he earned his commission as an ensign in the navy. After earning his Ph.D., Craven worked at the David Taylor Model Basin of the Naval Surface Warfare Center at Carderock, Maryland, working on nuclear submarine hull designs. He received two civilian service awards in connection with these developments. He was later appointed as the project manager for the navy's Polaris submarine program and the navy's Special Projects Office. He later became its chief scientist. Craven was awarded two Distinguished Civilian Service Awards (the Department of Defense's highest honor for civilians) among other commendations.

While working for the navy, Craven helped pioneer the use of Bayesian search techniques to locate objects lost at sea (Bayesian search theory). Craven's work was instrumental in the navy's search for the missing hydrogen bomb that had been lost in the Mediterranean Sea, off the coast of Spain in 1966. Craven's next large accomplishment was in the search for and locating of the submarine USS Scorpion (SSN-589), which had disappeared in deep water in the Atlantic Ocean west of Portugal and Spain.

As chief scientist of the Special Projects Office, Craven was in charge of the Deep Submergence Systems Project, which included the SEALAB program. In February 1969, when aquanaut Berry L. Cannon died while attempting to repair a leak in SEALAB III, Craven headed an advisory group that determined the best method of salvaging the SEALAB habitat.

After leaving the navy, Craven became the marine affairs coordinator for the State of Hawaii and also the dean of marine programs at the University of Hawaii. During his time in Hawaii, it has been alleged that Craven was involved in the development and operation of the secretive salvage ship Glomar Explorer, built to follow up on the discovery of a sunken Soviet submarine, the K-129, by other of Craven's projects, the nuclear-powered spy submarine Halibut.

Craven also served on the U.S. government's Weather Modification Commission during the Carter Administration. During that time, a hypothetical method was developed to significantly reduce the impact of tropical cyclones. In 1976, after losing in his campaign to become a member of the United States House of Representatives, Craven was appointed as the Director of the Law of the Sea Institute. In 2001, he was the president of the Common Heritage Corporation.

After completing law school through an evening program, Craven was responsible for directing the International Law of the Sea Institute. In 1990 he established the Common Heritage Corporation for innovation management to benefit the common heritage of mankind. Craven was a member of the National Academy of Engineering.

According to the magazine Wired, Craven's latest undertaking was to link islands in the Pacific Ocean with sustainable energy, agriculture, and freshwater through the use of Deep Ocean Water pumped up using pipes from offshore. He was developing a new and innovative cold water therapy, which may produce significant health breakthroughs and slow the aging process.

Craven wrote the book, The Silent War: The Cold War Battle Beneath the Sea.

John Piña Craven's daughter, Sarah Craven, is a prominent international advocate of women's rights.

John Piña Craven resided in Honolulu, Hawaii for many years. In 1994, he ran against long-term Honolulu mayor Frank Fasi for the nomination of the new Best Party for governor; Fasi won the nomination but came in second in the general election.

In 1998, he received the first Distinguished Civilian Service Award by the Naval Submarine League for his work on Scorpion, Polaris, and other projects.

Craven died in Honolulu on February 12, 2015, at the age of 90, from Parkinson's disease.
