= Berry L. Cannon =

American aquanaut who died in a diving incident (1935–1969)

- Berry L. Cannon
- Born: 22 March 1935
- Died: 17 February 1969 (aged 33) off San Clemente Island, California, U.S.
- Other name: Berry Louis Cannon
- Education: University of Florida, B.S. 1962
- Occupations: Electronics engineer, aquanaut
- Spouse: Mary Lou Cannon

Berry Louis Cannon (March 22, 1935 – February 17, 1969) was an American aquanaut who served on the SEALAB II and III projects of the United States Navy. Cannon died while attempting to repair SEALAB III. A U.S. Navy Board of Inquiry concluded that Cannon died of carbon dioxide poisoning, and that his diving rig's baralyme canister, which should have absorbed the carbon dioxide Cannon exhaled, was empty.

== Early life and education ==
Born March 22, 1935, Cannon grew up in Williston, Florida, where he was raised by his grandmother. He was captain of his high school football team and graduated from Williston High School. Cannon joined the United States Navy after high school and served for four years, becoming a Mineman Second Class. At one time he served at the Hawthorne Naval Ammunition Depot in Hawthorne, Nevada, where he was on the boxing team. Cannon graduated from the University of Florida in 1962 with a Bachelor of Science degree in Electronic Engineering.

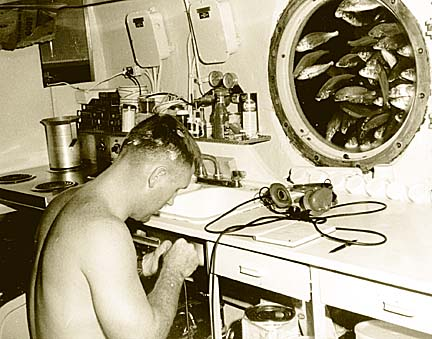
Cannon inside SEALAB II

== SEALAB II ==
Cannon was a civilian electronics engineer at the U.S. Navy Mine Defense Laboratory in Panama City, Florida, where he designed intercommunications systems. From August 28 to September 12, 1965, Cannon served on the first crew of SEALAB II near La Jolla, California. He received the Navy's Superior Civilian Service Award for his participation in the project.

== SEALAB III ==
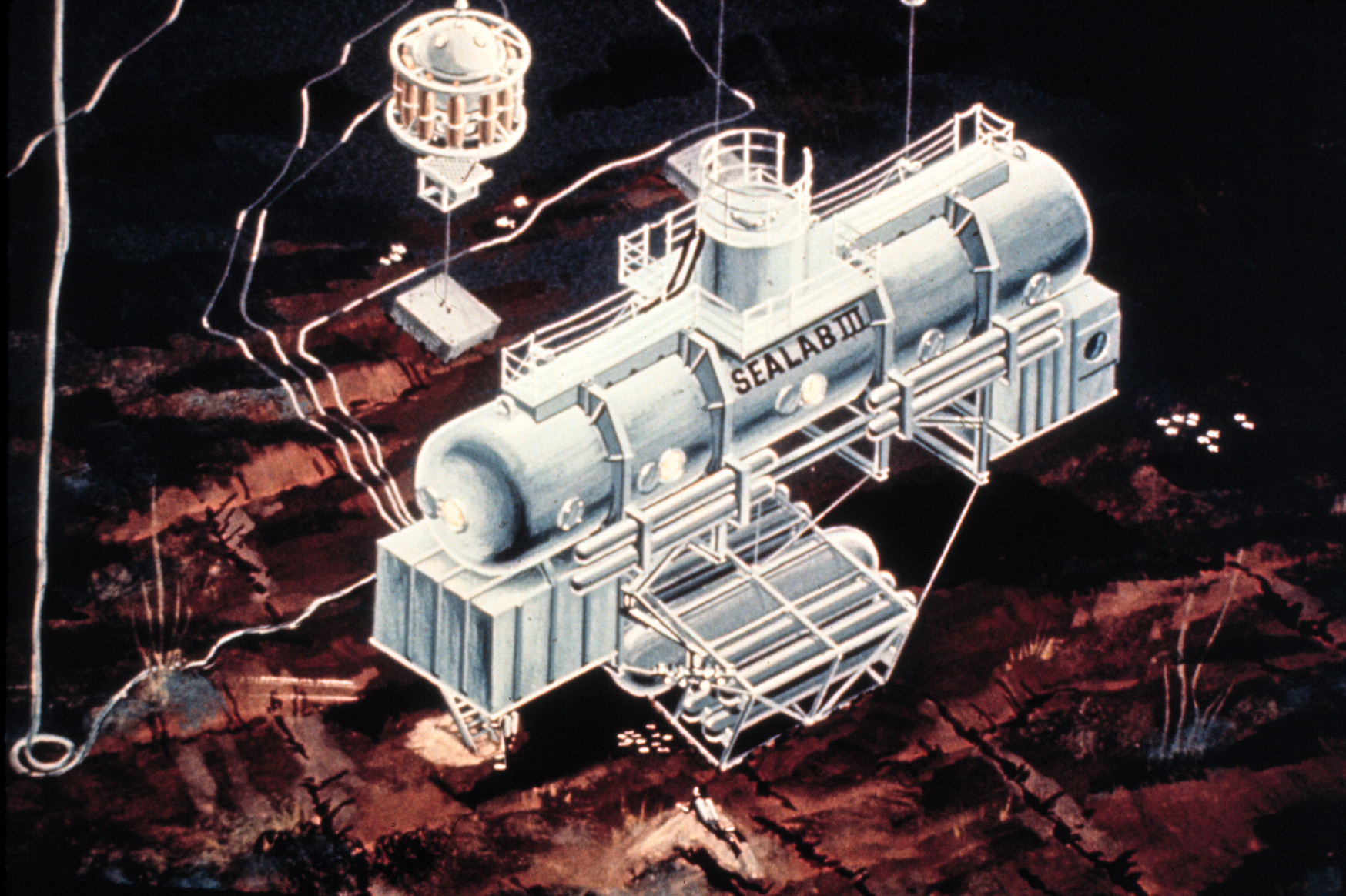
SEALAB III

In 1969, Cannon was assigned to Team One for the SEALAB III project, which would take place off San Clemente Island. He was one of four members of Team One assigned to open and secure the habitat, alongside fellow aquanauts Robert A. Barth, Richard Blackburn and John Reaves. On February 16, 1969, the SEALAB III habitat sprang a leak. Cannon, Barth, Blackburn and Reaves were twice sent down to SEALAB in the Personnel Transfer Capsule (PTC) in an attempt to repair the problem.

Shortly after 0500 hours on February 17, Cannon began to convulse while working on the exterior of the habitat. Barth tried to save him, holding his head in the breathable gas pocket of the skirt surrounding SEALAB's entrance and unsuccessfully attempting to force the mouthpiece of the emergency aqua-lung regulator between Cannon's teeth. Finally, Barth dragged Cannon back toward the PTC, where his fellow aquanauts helped him bring Cannon inside and Reaves and Blackburn attempted resuscitation. When the PTC reached the surface it was obvious that Cannon was dead. His body was placed in the outer airlock of the deck decompression chamber (DDC), returned to surface pressure and brought to San Diego Naval Hospital. Cannon's funeral was held at Humphrey Mortuary in Chula Vista, California, on February 19. He was buried at Wacahoota Baptist Cemetery in central Florida.

== Aftermath ==
It was widely reported in the news media that Cannon had died of a heart attack. However, the official board of inquiry, held in San Diego from February 28 to March 12, 1969, concluded that Cannon had in fact died of carbon dioxide poisoning. The carbon dioxide-scrubbing baralyme canister on Cannon's Mark IX diving rig was empty. The SEALAB III aquanauts, including Cannon, did not set up their own diving rigs. The identity of the person who failed to refill the baralyme canister was never determined. SEALAB medical officer Paul G. Linweaver later suggested that Cannon would have realized his equipment was faulty had he not been suffering from extreme cold due to breathing pressurized helium. Surgeon commander John Rawlins, a Royal Navy medical officer assigned to the project, also suggested that hypothermia was a contributing factor.

According to John Piña Craven, the U.S. Navy's head of the Deep Submergence Systems Project of which SEALAB was a part, SEALAB III had been "plagued with strange failures at the very start of operations". According to Craven, while the other divers were undergoing the weeklong decompression, repeated attempts were made to sabotage their air supply by someone aboard the command barge. Eventually, a guard was posted on the decompression chamber and the men were recovered safely. A potentially unstable suspect was identified by the staff psychiatrist but the culprit was never prosecuted. Craven suggests this may have been done to spare the Navy bad press so soon after the USS Pueblo (AGER-2) incident. As a result, it has been suggested that Cannon's death was a murder.

== Personal life ==
Cannon was married to Mary Lou Cannon and had three sons. He was known for seldom complaining if his complaint would go against command authority. He enjoyed reading the works of Zane Grey.

== Memorial ==
The Berry L. Cannon Memorial Aquarium was dedicated in 1970 to the distinguished honor and memory of Berry L. Cannon. It became part of the Citrus County School District's Marine Science Station in Crystal River, FL.

== Bibliography ==
- Barth, Bob (2000). Sea Dwellers: The Humor, Drama and Tragedy of the U.S. Navy SEALAB Programs. Houston, Texas: Doyle Publishing Company. ISBN 0-9653359-3-3. LCCN 99-32021.
- Bond, George F.; Siiteri, Helen A. (1993). Papa Topside: The Sealab Chronicles of Capt. George F. Bond, USN. Annapolis, Maryland: US Naval Institute Press. ISBN 1-55750-795-3.
- Bunton, William J. (2000). Death of an Aquanaut. Flagstaff, Arizona: Best Publishing Company. ISBN 0-941332-81-0. LCCN 99-66260.
- Hellwarth, Ben (2012). Sealab: America's Forgotten Quest to Live and Work on the Ocean Floor. New York: Simon & Schuster. ISBN 978-0-7432-4745-0. LCCN 2011015725.
