= Aquastar (watch brand) =

Swiss watch brand

- Industry: Watch manufacturing
- Founded: 1962
- Founder: Frédéric Robert
- Headquarters: Geneva, Switzerland
- Products: Watches
- Parent: Jeanrichard S.A.
- Website: www.aquastar.ch

Aquastar is a Swiss watch maker founded in 1962 by Frédéric Robert, a watchmaker, scuba diver, and skipper. Frederic Robert was the son of the 5th generation watchmaker family that founded the brand Jean Richard in the late 1800s. Aquastar has become known for its specialized instruments and wrist watches designed for professional diving. In 1962, the company Jeanrichard S.A. changed its name to Aquastar S.A. to reflect its new focus.

== History ==
Aquastar was established in Geneva, Switzerland, when Frédéric Robert took over the JeanRichard watch brand, which had been managed by his father. Robert rebranded the company as Aquastar to emphasize its focus on creating functional timepieces for aquatic use.

Frederic Robert filed numerous patents for dive watches that were to build the cornerstone for the development and evolution of the dive watch, among them, a new type of gasket for watch crowns and pushers, a friction ring that prevented the rotating bezel from slipping, the multiple dive non-decompression bezel and many more. Aquastar built the predecessor of today’s digital dive computer, made of a panel to be strapped in the wrist holding a waterproof dive watch with a rotating bezel to measure the dive time, a compass, a thermometer and a depth gauge. The panel also included the marine nationale non-decompression dive tables.

In the 1960s, Aquastar became known for its innovative features, particularly those aimed at professional divers. The brand was awarded multiple patents, including one for the inner rotating bezel used in the Model 63 and another for the decompression bezel featured in the Deepstar. These innovations were incorporated into a range of models designed for diving and regatta timing, such as the Benthos and the Regate.

Aquastar watches were initially available only through professional diving equipment outlets like Scubapro and Aqualung. and were not available through traditional jewelry and watch retail channels. However, this distribution model shifted in the 1970s.

In 1975, after Frédéric Robert’s retirement, Aquastar was sold to the Eren Group. Under new ownership, the brand expanded its distribution and made its dive and sports watches available to a wider audience. In 1982, the Seinet brothers acquired Aquastar. One of the brothers, a sailor and third-generation watchmaker, continued the brand's tradition of producing sailing and diving watches. Aquastar also introduced quartz-powered watches during this period, in response to changing consumer preferences.

From the 1980s to 2018, Aquastar focused on developing regatta timing watches, as well as quartz models that became commercially successful. In 2019, Aquastar was acquired by the Synchron Group under the guidance of Rick Marei and moved its business headquarters to Bienne, Switzerland.

== Product Lines ==
Aquastar has introduced several models throughout its history, many of which are highly regarded by collectors. Notable models include:

- Model 60
- Aquastar Atoll
- Aquastar Seatime
- Aquastar Deepstar
- Aquastar Regate
- Aquastar Benthos 500
- Aquastar Ethos

== See also ==
- Doxa SA
