= ALERTCalifornia =

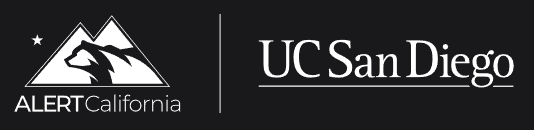
- ALERTCalifornia logo
- Project type: Wildfire Detection
- Funding agency: California Department of Forestry and Fire Protection
- Participants: University of California, San Diego: Jacobs School of Engineering; Scripps Institution of Oceanography; Qualcomm Institute
- Duration: May 03, 2023 – present
- Website: https://alertcalifornia.org/

ALERTCalifornia is a network of more than 1,200 web-connected cameras installed at high-risk wildland sites across the US state of California to help with wildfire detection and response. It is managed by the University of California, San Diego.

A pilot program uses artificial intelligence to detect abnormalities in the feeds and alert local firefighting resources.

The California Department of Forestry and Fire Protection (CAL FIRE) monitors ALERTCalifornia feeds for wildfires at its command centers across the state. Time magazine included ALERTCalifornia and the CAL FIRE AI Wildfire Detector on its list of "The Best Inventions of 2023."

== History ==
In 2001, HPWREN was established at UC San Diego for geologic monitoring. The system proved capable of providing real-time wireless connectivity for fire stations and other posts, camps, and bases. Over time HPWREN developed several cameras to help monitor for wildfires in a program called ALERTWildfire.

With funding from CAL FIRE and support from the Office of the California Governor, ALERTCalifornia was established with hundreds of cameras sensors. In 2023, ALERTCalifornia implemented an AI system to detect wildfires.
