= Man in the Sea Museum =

Diving museum in Panama City Beach, FL, USA

- Former name: The Institute of Diviing
- Established: 1982
- Location: 17314 Panama City Beach Parkway; Panama City Beach, Florida
- Type: Military Diving Museum
- Visitors: 9,870 (2024)
- Executive director: Steve Mulholland
- President: Stephen Greier
- Historian: Brian Thompson
- Website: Man in the Sea Museum

The Man in the Sea Museum is a Military Diving Museum. Located at 17314 Panama City Beach PKWY, FL. It has exhibits and documents related to the history of diving. Some of these exhibits include U.S. Navy SEALAB I, Military Diving Equipment, Underwater Submersibles, and Assorted Underwater Masks and Helmets. Many of the exhibits are hands-on.

== Exhibits ==
The museum's exhibits offers an in-depth look at the evolution of diving technology and underwater exploration.

== Special events and educational programs ==
The museum hosts a variety of special events, including lectures, film screenings, and workshops, often focusing on specific areas of diving history or marine science. Additionally, the museum offers educational programs, including dive training, presentations from diving professionals, and guided tours of the exhibits.

== Legacy and impact ==
Since 1982, the Man in the Sea Museum has been involved in preserving the history of diving and underwater exploration.
