= High Performance Wireless Research and Education Network =

Communications network in southern California

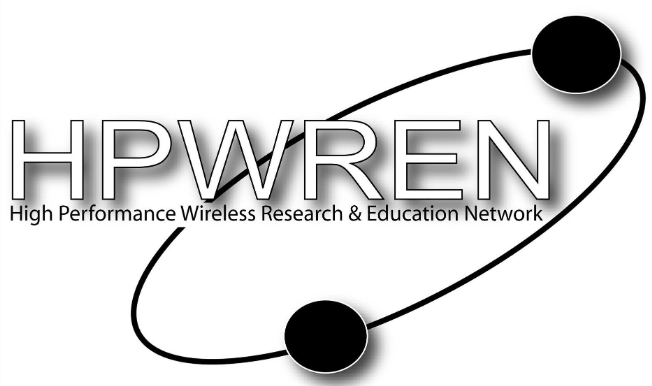
- HPWREN logo
- Founders: Hans-Werner Braun; Frank Vernon
- Established: 2000
- Owner: University of California, San Diego: San Diego Supercomputer Center; Scripps Institution of Oceanography
- Website: https://www.hpwren.ucsd.edu/

The High Performance Wireless Research and Education Network (HPWREN) is a network infrastructure system that provides Internet access to more than 60 regional fire stations and community access to both meteorological stations and more than 140+ cameras (color and near-infrared) around Southern California.

The network was begun in 2000 with the support of the National Science Foundation to provide communications to remote seismic sensors and other facilities in eastern San Diego County. Its remote camera systems were later expanded to support firefighting efforts in remote wildland areas. In the mid-2010s the network partnered with a regional ALERTWildfire system of wildland cameras, which in 2022 was incorporated into the statewide ALERTCalifornia wildland camera system.

== Network ==
The program includes the creation, demonstration, and evaluation of a non-commercial, prototype, high-performance, wide-area, wireless network in its service area. Currently, the HPWREN network is used for network analysis research, and it also provides high-speed Internet access to field researchers.

=== Service area ===
Southern California, specifically San Diego, Riverside, and Imperial counties.

=== Backbone nodes ===
The network includes backbone nodes located at the University of California, San Diego (UC San Diego) and San Diego State University (SDSU) campuses, as well as a number of "hard-to-reach" areas in remote environments.

== Operations ==
The HPWREN backbone itself operates primarily in the licensed spectrum, and project researchers use off-the-shelf technology to create a redundant topology. Access links often use license-exempt radios.

In 2002, HPWREN researchers conducted an expedition to locate the SEALAB II/III habitat located off Scripps Pier in La Jolla, California. From the MV Kellie Chouest and utilizing a Scorpio ROV to find the site, researchers were able to conduct a live multicast from ship to shore.

== Topology ==
The network spans from the Southern California coast to the inland valleys, on to the high mountains (reaching more than 8700 feet), and out to the remote desert. The network's longest link is 72 miles (116 km) – reaching from the San Diego Supercomputer Center to San Clemente Island.

== See also ==
- Mount Laguna Observatory
