= Baralyme =

Carbon dioxide scrubber absorbent mixture of calcium and barium hydroxides

Baralyme is a mixture of 80% calcium hydroxide and 20% barium hydroxide compounds that is used as an alternative to soda lime to absorb the exhaled carbon dioxide in a closed circuit anesthetic system.

The substance has been used for carbon dioxide scrubbing in diving bells and the U.S Navy's engineered SEALABs I, II, and the failed SEALAB III.
