= SEALAB =

Experimental underwater habitats developed by the United States Navy

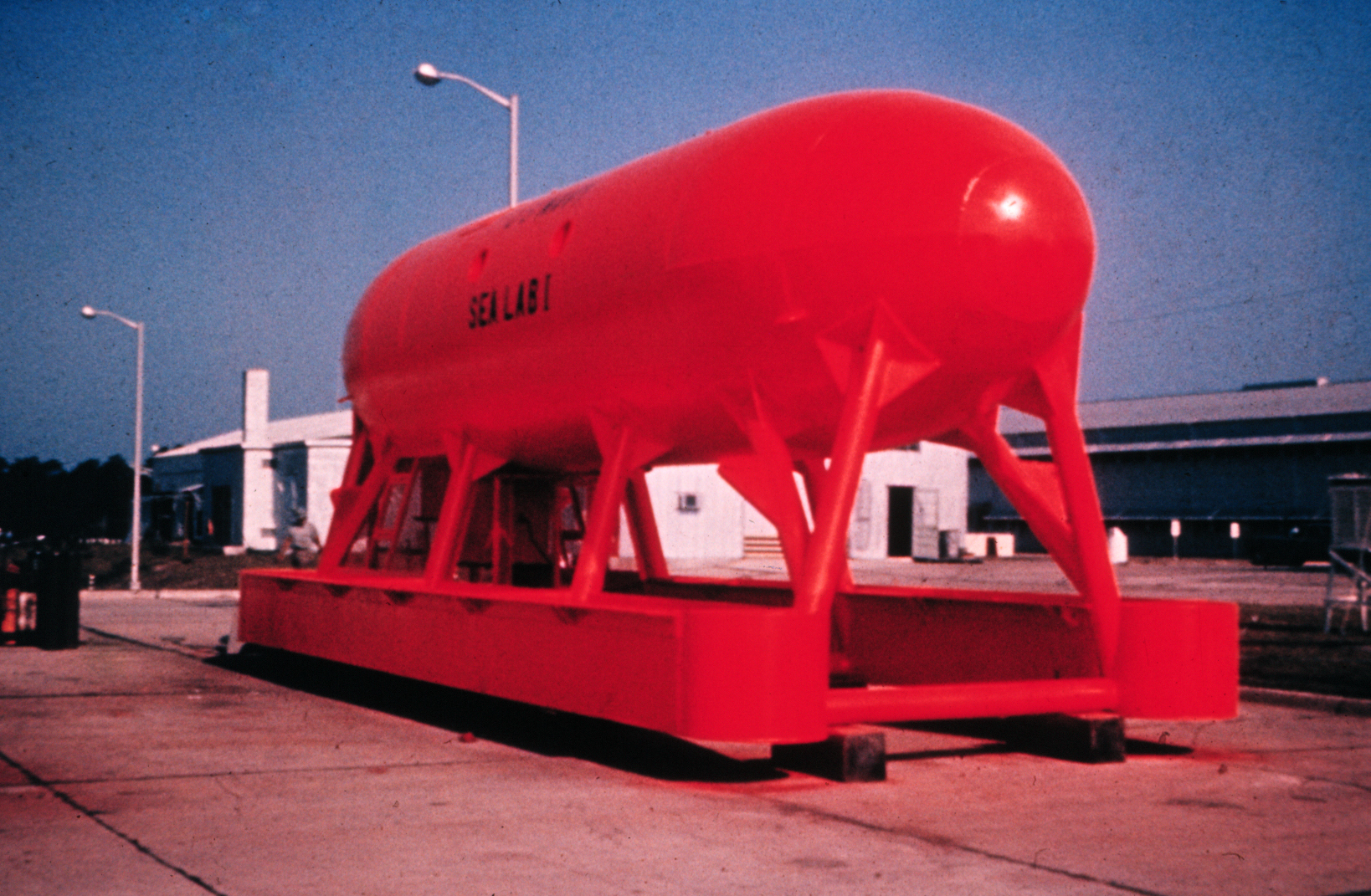
- SEALAB I

General information
- Type: Research Station

SEALAB I, II, and III were experimental underwater habitats developed and deployed by the United States Navy during the 1960s to prove the viability of saturation diving and humans living in isolation for extended periods of time. The knowledge gained from the SEALAB expeditions helped advance the science of deep sea diving and rescue and contributed to the understanding of the psychological and physiological strains humans can endure.

== United States Navy Genesis Project ==
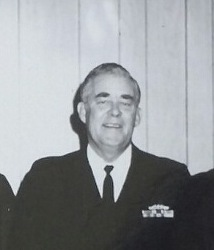
Captain George F. Bond, MD, senior medical officer and principal investigator for the SEALAB I and II experiments.

Preliminary research work was undertaken by George F. Bond, who named the project after the Book of Genesis, which prophesied humans would gain dominion over the oceans. Bond began investigations in 1957 to develop theories about saturation diving. Bond's team exposed rats, goats, monkeys, and human beings to various gas mixtures at different pressures. By 1963 they had collected enough data to test the first SEALAB habitat.

At the time, Jacques Cousteau and Edwin A. Link were pursuing privately funded saturation diving projects to study long-term underwater living. Link's efforts resulted in the first underwater habitat, occupied by aquanaut Robert Sténuit in the Mediterranean Sea at a depth of 61 m (200 ft) for one day on September 6, 1962. Cousteau's habitats included Conshelf I, with a 2-person crew at a depth of 10 m (33 ft) near Marseilles, placed on September 14, 1962, and Conshelf II, placed in the Red Sea at depths of 11 and 27 m (36 and 89 ft) on June 15, 1963. Later that year, the Kennedy administration decided to open a new "race" frontier, directing the navy to begin the SEALAB program.

== SEALAB I ==
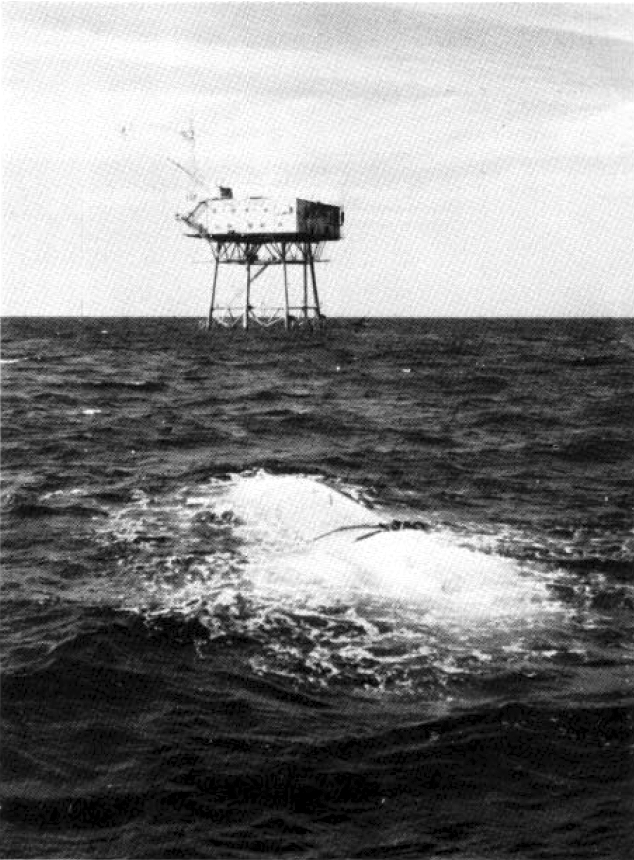
SEALAB I being lowered off Bermuda in 1964

SEALAB I was commanded by Captain Bond, who became known as "Papa Topside." SEALAB I proved that saturation diving in the open ocean was viable for extended periods. The experiment also offered information about habitat placement, habitat umbilicals, humidity, and helium speech descrambling.

SEALAB I was lowered off the coast of Bermuda on July 20, 1964 to a depth of 192 feet (59 m) below the ocean surface. It was constructed from two converted floats and held in place with axles from railroad cars. The experiment involved four divers (LCDR Robert Thompson, MC; Gunners Mate First Class Lester Anderson, Chief Quartermaster Robert A. Barth, and Chief Hospital Corpsman Sanders Manning), who were to stay submerged for three weeks. The experiment was halted after 11 days due to an approaching tropical storm. SEALAB I demonstrated the same issues as Conshelf: high humidity, temperature control, and verbal communication in the helium atmosphere.

The astronaut and second American to orbit the Earth, Scott Carpenter, was scheduled to be the fifth aquanaut in the habitat. Carpenter was trained by Robert A. Barth. Shortly before the experiment took place, Carpenter had a scooter accident on Bermuda and broke a few bones. The crash ruined his chances of making the dive.

SEALAB I is on display at the Man in the Sea Museum, in Panama City Beach, Florida, near where it was initially tested offshore before being deployed. It is on outdoor display. Its metal hull is largely intact, though the paint faded to a brick red over the years. The habitat's exterior was restored as part of its 50th anniversary, and it sports its original colors.

== SEALAB II ==
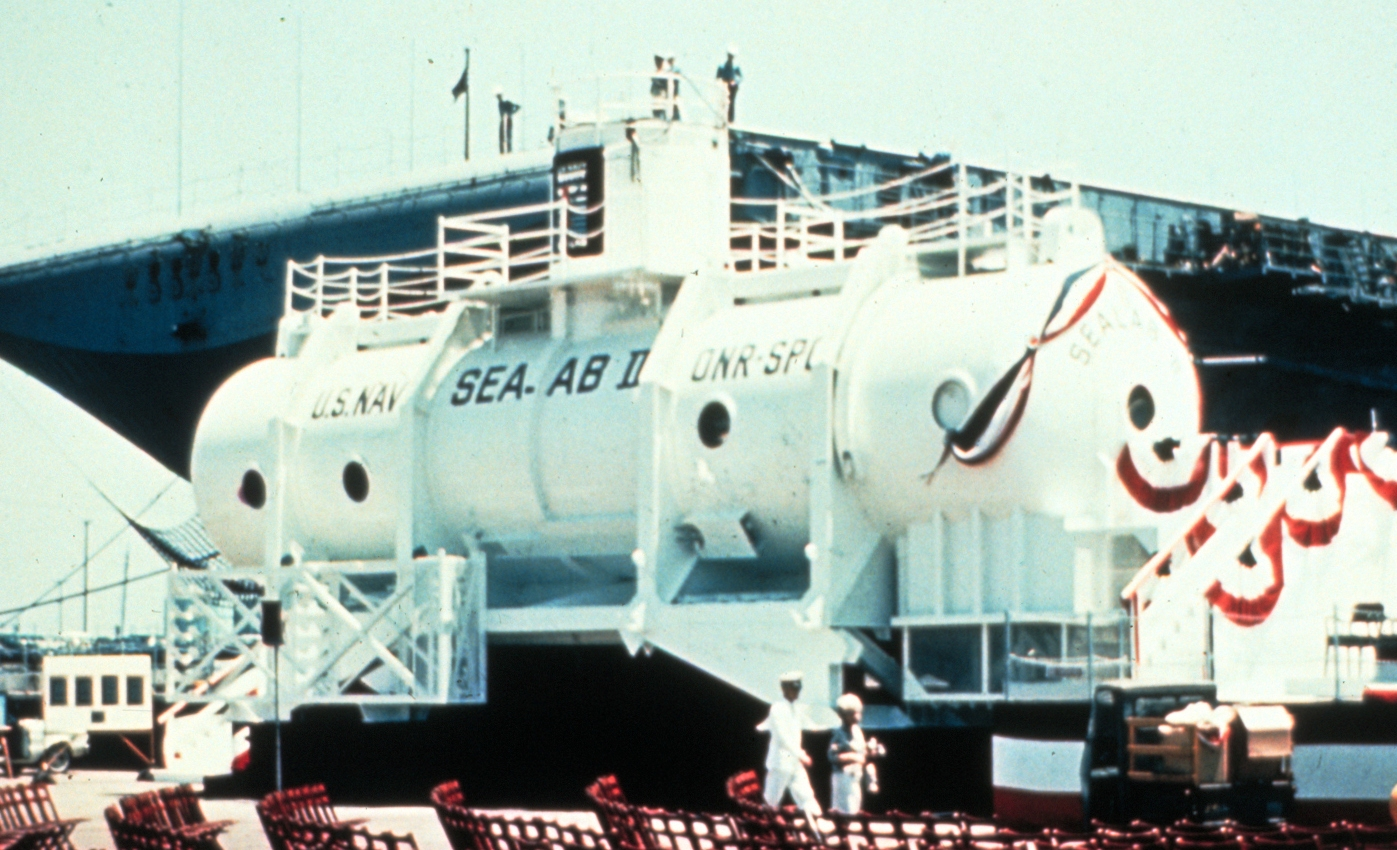
SEALAB II above surface

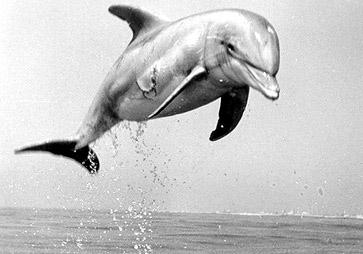
Tuffy the dolphin delivered supplies to SEALAB II

SEALAB II was launched in 1965. It was nearly twice as large as SEALAB I with heating coils installed in the deck to ward off the constant helium-induced chill, and air conditioning to reduce the oppressive humidity. Facilities included hot showers, a built-in toilet, laboratory equipment, eleven viewing ports, two exits, and refrigeration. It was placed in the La Jolla Canyon off the coast of Scripps Institution of Oceanography at UC San Diego, in La Jolla, California, at a depth of 205 feet (62 m). On August 28, 1965, the first of three teams of divers moved into what became known as the "Tilton Hilton" (Tiltin' Hilton, because of the slope of the landing site). The support ship Berkone hovered on the surface above, within sight of Scripps Pier. The helium atmosphere conducted heat away from the divers’ bodies so quickly temperatures were raised to 30 °C (86 °F) to ward off chill.

Each team spent 15 days in the habitat, but aquanaut/former astronaut Scott Carpenter remained below for a record 30 days. In addition to physiological testing, the 28 divers tested new tools, methods of salvage, and an electrically heated drysuit. They were aided by a bottlenose dolphin named Tuffy from the United States Navy Marine Mammal Program. Aquanauts and Navy trainers attempted, with mixed results, to teach Tuffy to ferry supplies from the surface to SEALAB or from one diver to another, and to come to the rescue of an aquanaut in distress. When the SEALAB II mission ended on 10 October 1965, there were plans for Tuffy also to take part in SEALAB III.

A sidenote from SEALAB II was a congratulatory telephone call that was arranged for Carpenter and President Lyndon B. Johnson. Carpenter was calling from a decompression chamber with helium gas replacing nitrogen, so Carpenter sounded unintelligible to operators. The tape of the call circulated for years among Navy divers before it was aired on National Public Radio in 1999.

In 2002, a group of researchers from the Scripps Institution of Oceanography's High Performance Wireless Research and Education Network boarded the MV Kellie Chouest and used a Scorpio ROV to find the site of the SEALAB habitat. This expedition was the first return to the site since the habitat was moved.

== SEALAB III ==
With naval research funding constrained by Vietnam War combat requirements, it was four years later before SEALAB III used the refurbished SEALAB II habitat placed in water three times as deep. Five teams of nine divers were scheduled to spend 12 days each in the habitat, testing new salvage techniques and conducting oceanographic and fishery studies. Preparations for such a deep dive were extensive. In addition to many biomedical studies, work-up dives were conducted at the U.S. Navy Experimental Diving Unit at the Washington, D.C., Navy Yard. These “dives” were not done in the open sea, but in a special hyperbaric chamber that could recreate the pressures at depths as great as 1,025 feet (312 m) of sea water.

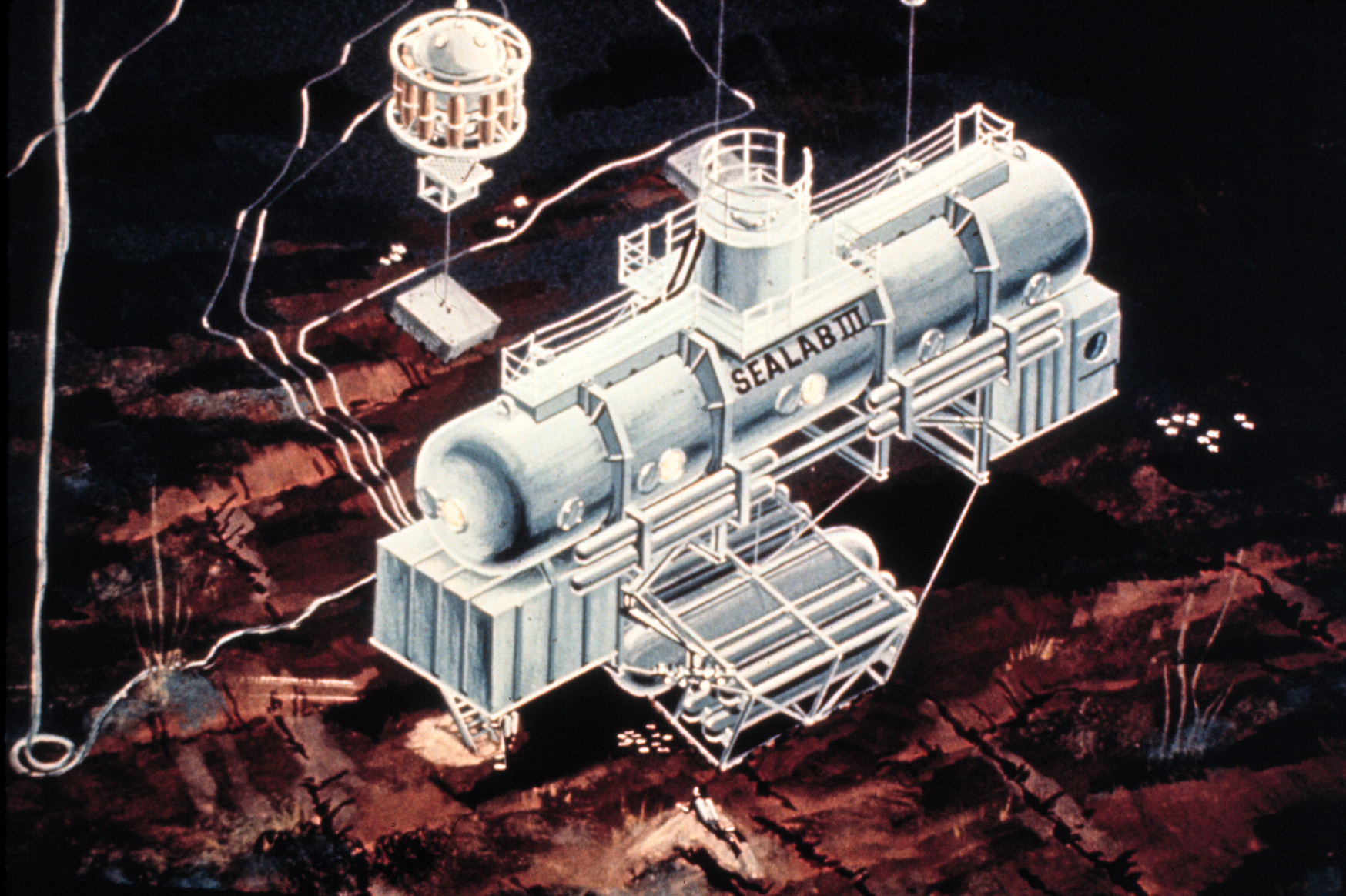
SEALAB III, artist's impression

According to John Piña Craven, the U.S. Navy's head of the Deep Submergence Systems Project of which SEALAB was a part, SEALAB III "was plagued with strange failures at the very start of operations." USS Elk River (IX-509) was specially fitted as a SEALAB operations support ship to replace Berkone; but the project was 18 months late and three million dollars over budget when SEALAB III was lowered to 610 feet (190 m) off San Clemente Island, California, on 15 February 1969. SEALAB team members were tense and frustrated by these delays, and began taking risks to make things work. When a poorly sized neoprene seal caused helium to leak from the habitat at an unacceptable rate, four divers volunteered to repair the leak in place rather than lifting the habitat to the surface. Their first attempt was unsuccessful, and the divers had been awake for twenty hours using amphetamines to stay alert for a second attempt, during which aquanaut Berry L. Cannon died. A U.S. Navy Board of Inquiry found that Cannon's rebreather was missing baralyme, the chemical necessary to remove carbon dioxide. Surgeon commander John Rawlins, a Royal Navy medical officer assigned to the project, also suggested that hypothermia during the dive was a contributing factor to the problem not being recognized by the diver.

According to Craven, while the other divers were undergoing the week-long decompression, repeated attempts were made to sabotage their air supply by someone aboard the command barge. Eventually, a guard was posted on the decompression chamber and the men were recovered safely. A potentially unstable suspect was identified by the staff psychiatrist, but the culprit was never prosecuted. Craven suggests this may have been done to spare the Navy bad press so soon after the USS Pueblo (AGER-2) incident.

After reinvestigating Cannon's death, ocean engineer Kevin Hardy concluded in a 2024 article that "There is greater evidence that Berry Cannon died from electrocution than CO_{2} poisoning."

The SEALAB program came to a halt, and although the SEALAB III habitat was retrieved, it was eventually scrapped. Aspects of the research continued, but no new habitats were built.

NCEL (now a part of Naval Facilities Engineering Service Center) of Port Hueneme, California, was responsible for the handling of several contracts involving life support systems used on SEALAB III.

A model of SEALAB III can be found at the Man in the Sea Museum in Panama City Beach, Florida.

== See also ==
- Aquanaut – Diver who remains underwater for 24 hours or more
- Continental Shelf Station Two – Undersea research habitat in the Red Sea
- NEEMO – NASA Extreme Environment Mission Operation project
- Skylab – First space station launched and operated by NASA (1973–1979)
- Underwater habitat – Human habitable underwater enclosure filled with breathable gas

== Bibliography ==
- Barth, Bob (2000). Sea Dwellers: The Humor, Drama and Tragedy of the U.S. Navy SEALAB Programs. Houston, Texas: Doyle Publishing Company. ISBN 0-9653359-3-3. LCCN 99-32021.
- Bond, George F.; Siiteri, Helen A. (1993). Papa Topside: The Sealab Chronicles of Capt. George F. Bond, USN. Annapolis, MD: US Naval Institute Press. ISBN 1-55750-795-3.
- Bunton, William J. (2000). Death of an Aquanaut. Flagstaff, Arizona: Best Publishing Company. ISBN 0-941332-81-0. LCCN 99-66260.
- Hellwarth, Ben (2012). Sealab: America's Forgotten Quest to Live and Work on the Ocean Floor. New York: Simon & Schuster. ISBN 978-0-7432-4745-0. LCCN 2011015725.
- Rawlinson, Jonathan (1988). From Space to the Seabed. Vero Beach, Florida: Rourke Enterprises, Inc. ISBN 0-86592-872-X. LCCN 88-15815. (For children.)
