= Aquanaut =

Diver who remains underwater for 24 hours or more

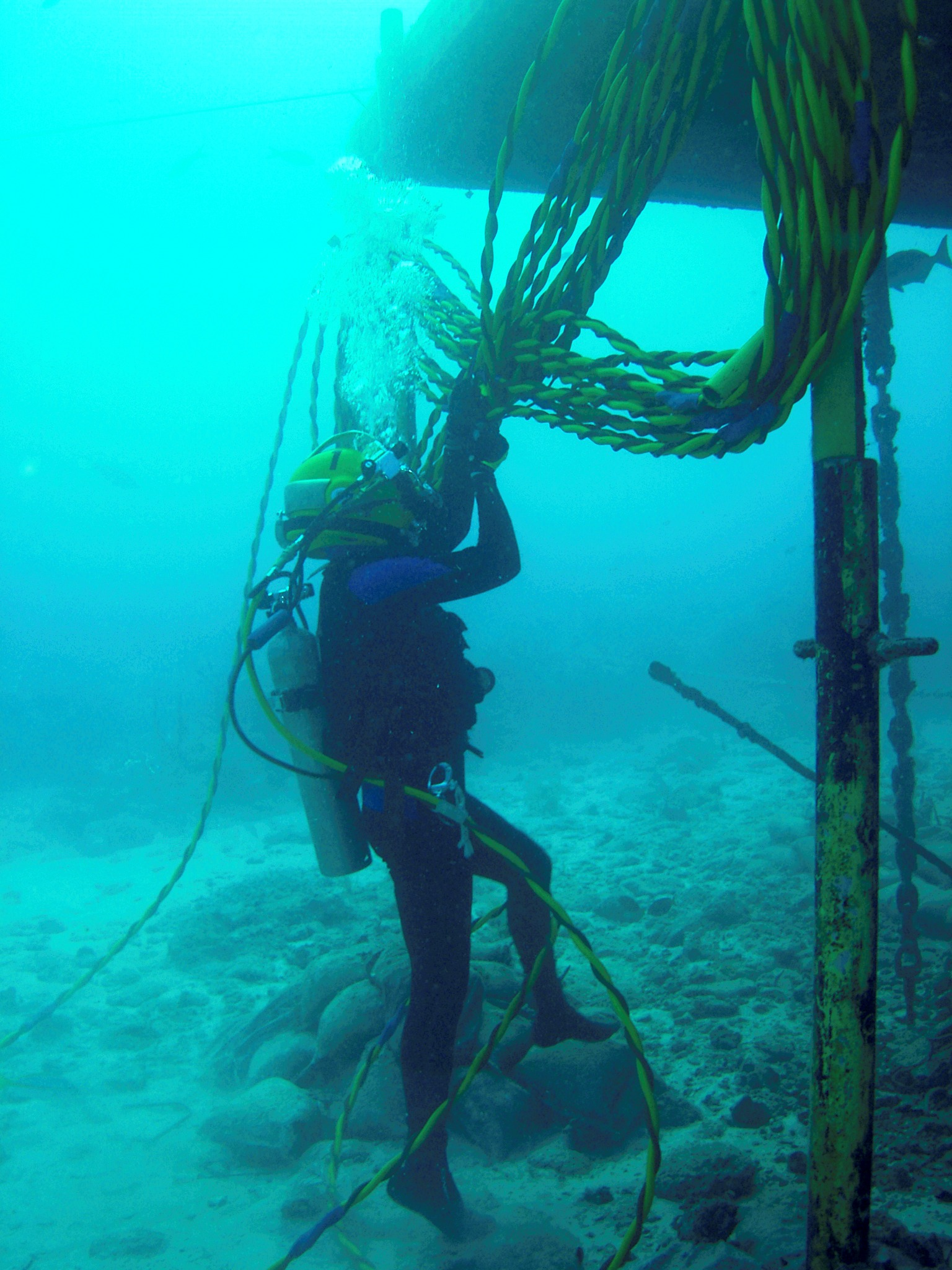
Aquanaut Josef Schmid working outside the Aquarius underwater laboratory in 2007.

An aquanaut is any person who remains underwater, breathing at the ambient pressure for long enough for the concentration of the inert components of the breathing gas dissolved in the body tissues to reach equilibrium, in a state known as saturation.

== Description ==
The term aquanaut derives from the Latin word aqua ("water") plus the Greek nautes ("sailor"), by analogy to the similar construction "astronaut." The word is used to describe a person who stays underwater, breathing at the ambient pressure for long enough for the concentration of the inert components of the breathing gas dissolved in the body tissues to reach equilibrium, in a state known as saturation. Usually this is done in an underwater habitat on the seafloor for a period equal to or greater than 24 continuous hours without returning to the surface.

The term is often restricted to scientists and academics, though there were a group of military aquanauts during the SEALAB program. Commercial divers in similar circumstances are referred to as saturation divers. An aquanaut is distinct from a submariner, in that a submariner is confined to a moving underwater vehicle such as a submarine that holds the water pressure out.

The first human aquanaut was Robert Sténuit, who spent 24 hours on board a tiny one-man cylinder at 200 feet (61 m) in September 1962 off Villefranche-sur-Mer on the French Riviera.

== U.S. programs ==
Military aquanauts include Robert Sheats, author Robin Cook, and astronauts Scott Carpenter, and Alan Shepard. Civilian aquanaut Berry L. Cannon died in 1969 of carbon dioxide poisoning during the U.S. Navy's SEALAB III project.

From 1969 to 1970, NASA carried out two programs, known as Tektite I and Tektite II, using the Tektite habitat. Missions were carried out in which scientists stayed in the capsule for up to 20 days, in order to study fish ecology as well as to prove that saturation diving techniques in an underwater laboratory, breathing a nitrogen-oxygen atmosphere, could be safely and efficiently accomplished at a minimal cost. Tektite II also studied the psychological aspects of living in such confinement.

Scientific aquanauts include Sylvia Earle, Jonathan Helfgott, Joseph B. MacInnis, Dick Rutkowski, Phil Nuytten, and about 700 others, including the crew members (many of them astronauts) of NASA's NEEMO missions at the Aquarius underwater laboratory.

== Russian military programs ==
A unit of the Russian Navy has developed an aquanaut program that has deployed divers more than 300 metres (980 ft) deep. An ocean vessel has been developed and is based in Vladivostok that is specialized for submarine and other deep sea rescue and that is equipped with a diving complex and a 120-seat deep sea diving craft.

== Accidental aquanaut ==
A Nigerian ship's cook, Harrison Odjegba Okene, survived for 60 hours in a sunken tugboat, the Jascon-4, which had capsized on 26 May 2013 due to rough seas while performing tension tow operations and stabilising an oil tanker at a Chevron platform in the Gulf of Guinea off the Nigerian coast. After sinking, the boat came to rest upside-down on the sea floor at a depth of 30 m (100 ft); eleven crew members perished. As the Jascon-4 filled with water, Okene had felt around the interior underwater and found his way into the engineer's office, where he found an air pocket about 1.2 m (4 ft) in height that contained enough oxygen to keep him alive.

Three days after the accident, Okene was discovered by three South African divers from a saturation diving support vessel, employed to investigate the sunken ship and recover bodies. Having unintentionally discovered Okene alive within the ship, the rescuers provided him with a diving helmet so he could breathe during the transit to the diving bell. He was then returned to the surface after decompression from saturation, which took about two and a half days. After his survival underwater, he faced and overcame his psychological trauma and later became a commercial diver himself, earning an International Marine Contractors Association recognised Class 2 certificate. He has since stated that he went on to work for the same company that carried out his rescue.

== See also ==
- Continental Shelf Station Two – Undersea research habitat in the Red Sea
- Jacques Cousteau – French oceanographer and author (1910–1997)
- World Without Sun – 1964 documentary film by Jacques Cousteau
- La Chalupa Research Laboratory – Primary platform for the Scott Carpenter Man in the Sea Program
- Astronaut – Spacecraft crew member
