= Landucci =

Landucci is an Italian surname. Notable people with the surname include:

- Lisa Landucci, American Singer-Songwriter
- Dominic Landucci, American aquanaut
- Luca Landucci (1436–1516), Italian apothecary
- Marco Landucci (born 1964), Italian footballer and coach
