= Marc Reagan =

American Station Training Lead in Mission Operations at NASA's Johnson Space Center

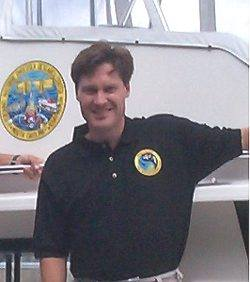
- Marc Reagan
- Education: BS, Aerospace Engineering, Texas A&M University; MS, Aerospace Engineering Sciences, University of Colorado Boulder
- Employer: NASA
- Known for: Aquanaut, NEEMO Mission Director
- Title: Station Training Lead

Marcum "Marc" Reagan (born c. 1967) is a Station Training Lead in Mission Operations at NASA's Johnson Space Center in Houston, Texas. He leads a team of instructors who together are responsible for developing and executing complex simulations for International Space Station (ISS) assembly and operations. Reagan also serves as an ISS "Capcom" from Mission Control, communicating with ISS astronauts in orbit. In May 2002, Reagan served as an aquanaut on the NASA Extreme Environment Mission Operations 2 (NEEMO 2) crew. He subsequently served as Mission Director for multiple NEEMO missions.

== Early life and education ==
Reagan grew up in Hobbs, New Mexico, and has long been fascinated with the exploration of the sea and space. As a child he saw one of the early moonwalks on television and knew that he wanted to be part of space exploration some day.

Reagan has a Bachelor of Science degree in aerospace engineering from Texas A&M University, where he graduated summa cum laude in 1989. He received an Master of Science degree in aerospace engineering sciences, on a NASA Fellowship, at the University of Colorado Boulder in 1993.

== NASA career ==
Reagan was responsible for the crew and flight controller training for the second ISS assembly mission (the 100th shuttle flight), was in charge of training the 4th Expedition Crew to the ISS, and led the training for the 8th ISS crew. He has been extensively involved in negotiations and the development of training with the Russian Space Agency in support of the ISS, as well as the Japanese and European Space Agencies. He is proficient in the Russian language.

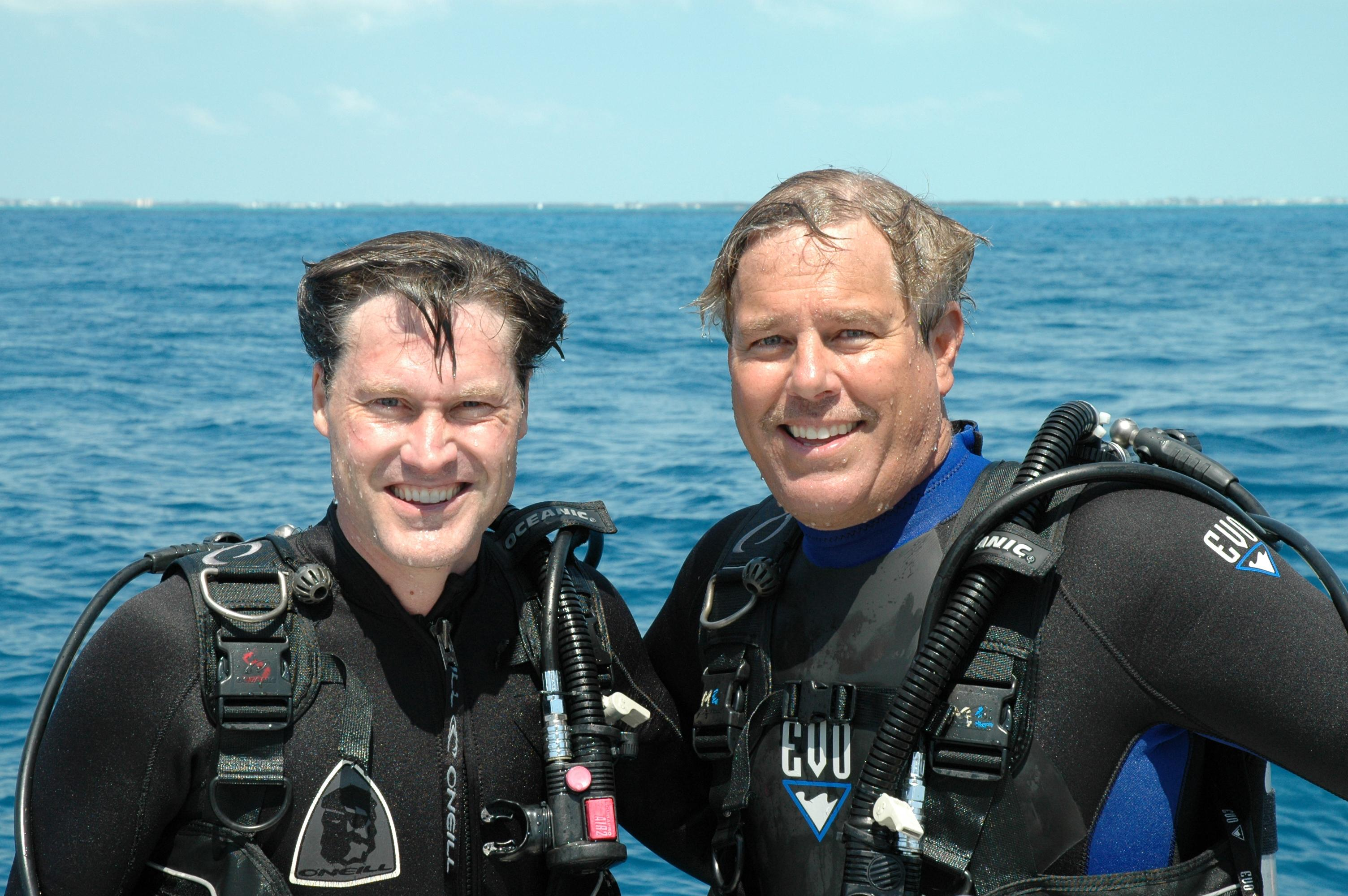
Reagan with NEEMO project lead Bill Todd after leaving the NEEMO 9 crew in Aquarius.

The other primary part of Reagan's job has been his position as Deputy Project Manager for the NASA Undersea Research Team "NEEMO" (NASA Extreme Environment Mission Operations), conducted in the Aquarius underwater laboratory near Key Largo, Florida. He has supported NEEMO missions, including NEEMO 3, 4 and 5, from the surface as part of the core "Surface Support Team", serving as mission lead for NEEMO 4. Reagan has said that he "self-selected" for the NEEMO project by volunteering at an early stage to help put it together. Reagan trained as a backup for the first NEEMO mission, NEEMO 1, in October 2001, and was one of the aquanauts on the NEEMO 2 mission in May 2002. Prior to NEEMO 2, Reagan wrote: "I am excited about the opportunity to be a part of this 2nd NEEMO mission - this is such a rare and unique opportunity. To work and live in the sea for nine days will be the fulfillment of a dream for me." During NEEMO 2, Reagan commented in his Mission Day 2 journal entry: "At noon today ... we officially became aquanauts. Not 'certified trained as aquanauts,' not 'wannabe aquanauts,' but real aquanauts. Welcome to a pretty exclusive club. In case you were wondering, there is no door prize, but the job benefits are outstanding. Technically, the term aquanaut is limited to those who stay underwater for 24 hours or more."

Reagan has subsequently supported multiple NEEMO missions, and served as Mission Director for NEEMO 6, NEEMO 9, NEEMO 10, NEEMO 11, NEEMO 12 and NEEMO 13.

== Personal life ==
Reagan is a certified PADI underwater diver with Enriched Air, Advanced, and Rescue Diver certifications. He is also an instrument rated pilot with complex, tailwheel and aerobatic endorsements.

Reagan's hobbies include soccer, water and snow skiing, scuba diving, and music. He plays the keyboard and sings in a rock 'n roll band made up of colleagues called the "Rockit Scientists". Reagan has lived in League City, Texas and Houston, Texas. He has a son named Kyle.
