= Tara Ruttley =

Associate Chief Scientist for Microgravity Research at NASA Headquarters

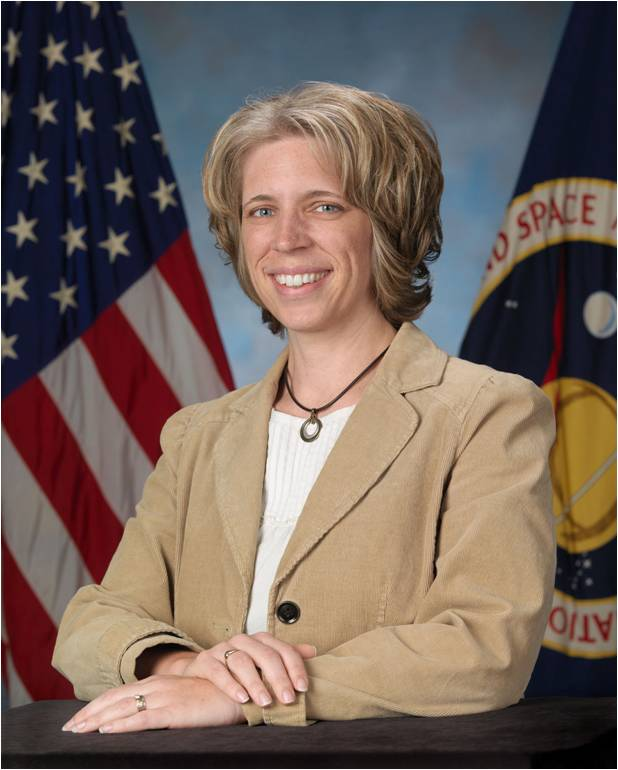
- Rottley in 2011
- Born: Houma, Louisiana
- Education: B.S., Biology, Colorado State University; M.S., Mechanical Engineering (emphasis in Biomedical Engineering), Colorado State University; Ph.D., Neuroscience, University of Texas Medical Branch at Galveston
- Occupations: Engineer, scientist
- Employer: National Aeronautics and Space Administration
- Known for: Aquanaut
- Title: Associate Chief Scientist
- Spouse: Paul Elvin Colosky

Tara Melaine Ruttley (born 1975/1976) is Associate Chief Scientist for Microgravity Research at NASA Headquarters in Washington, DC. Prior to this, she was Associate Program Scientist for the International Space Station (ISS) at NASA's Johnson Space Center in Houston, Texas. Until 2007, she was lead hardware engineer for the ISS Health Maintenance System, leading a team of engineers whose job was to provide reliable medical equipment that kept astronauts healthy in orbit. She subsequently served as the lead hardware engineer for the ISS Human Research Facility. She served as an aquanaut on the NASA Extreme Environment Mission Operations 6 (NEEMO 6) crew in July 2004.

== Education ==
Ruttley was born in Houma, Louisiana, and raised in Lafayette, Louisiana. Since Ruttley had always loved biology and physiology, she started her educational journey focusing on a career in life sciences. She received a Bachelor of Science degree in biology and a Master of Science in mechanical engineering with an emphasis in biomedical engineering from Colorado State University (CSU), where she was a member of the Class of 2000. She also received a Ph.D. in neuroscience in 2007 from University of Texas Medical Branch at Galveston. Ruttley was a McNair Scholar at CSU.

At CSU, Ruttley became involved with the Colorado Space Grant Consortium and the student branch of the American Institute of Aeronautics and Astronautics (AIAA). As an undergraduate, and through her participation in student design conferences, she became more interested in the hardware aspects of maintaining optimal crew health in space. Ruttley soon realized the importance of an interdisciplinary approach to designing hardware for crew health, so she pursued her master's degree in mechanical engineering. Ruttley also belonged to the American Society of Mechanical Engineers and Sigma Xi while attending CSU.

Ruttley's master's thesis was the testing of a novel gravity-independent resistive exercise device, the Constant Force Resistive Exercise Unit (CFREU), which she had developed in collaboration with CSU's AIAA student design team. The team had tested one version of the machine in microgravity aboard NASA's KC-135 aircraft. They subsequently received a $70,000 contract from NASA to develop an improved prototype. Ruttley and her husband, Paul Colosky, patented the CFREU design when they graduated from CSU.

In 2018, Ruttley completed an MA in Anthropology/Archaeology at the University of Houston, where her research focused on spiritual practices of the pre-Civil war enslaved populations at the Jordan Plantation in Brazoria County, Tx.

== NASA career ==
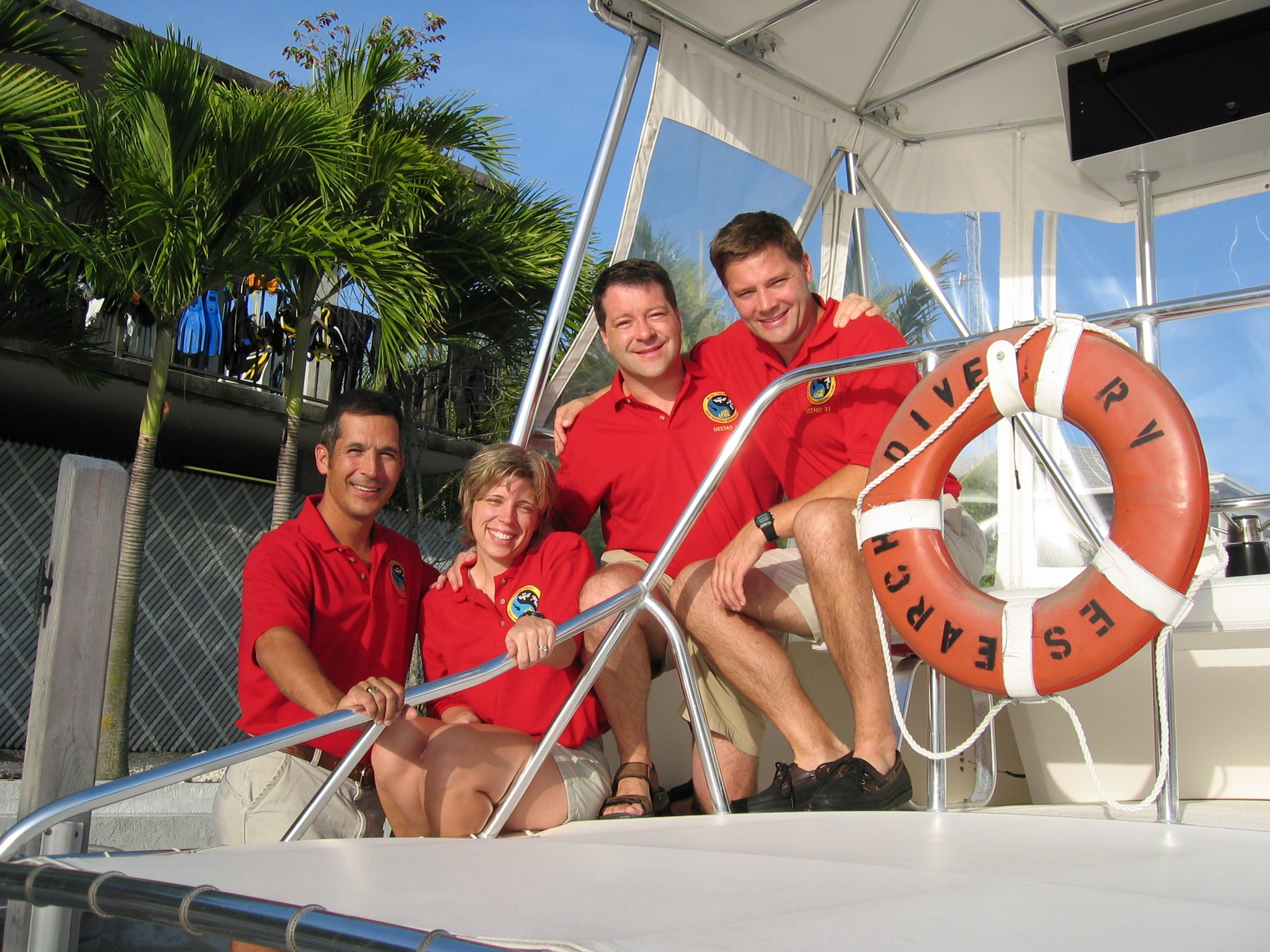
The NEEMO 6 crew. L-R: John Herrington, Ruttley, Nicholas Patrick, Douglas H. Wheelock. Not pictured: support crew members Craig B. Cooper and Joseph March.

Ruttley received an offer to work for NASA's Biomedical Systems Division upon graduation. She came to work for NASA in January 2001, where her first project was developing a detector for the presence of hydrazine on astronauts' space suits after EVAs from the ISS. She went on to become a project engineer for the exercise bicycle currently on the ISS. Ruttley subsequently served as lead hardware engineer for the ISS Human Research Facility, and later became Associate Program Scientist for the ISS. In 2010, Ruttley responded to criticisms of the cost of the ISS, saying, "I think those who are naysayers haven't given us a chance — haven't given us enough time to show what we can do." In a 2011 interview, Ruttley offered reassurance to scientists concerned that the end of the Space Shuttle program would interfere with ISS research projects, saying, "If you have an investigation you want to do on the space station, we will get you there."

In July 2004, Ruttley became an aquanaut through her participation in the joint NASA-NOAA, NEEMO 6 (NASA Extreme Environment Mission Operations) project, an exploration research mission held in Aquarius, the world's only undersea research laboratory. Ruttley and her crewmates lived and worked underwater for ten days. During the NEEMO 6 mission, Ruttley represented the JSC Engineering Directorate as an Engineer/Aquanaut and was in charge of leading the hardware experiments. A redesigned version of the CFREU was evaluated for potential spaceflight use during the NEEMO 6 mission. On the final day of NEEMO 6, Ruttley wrote, "The physical and mental challenge for me was the best of my life."

Ruttley teaches undergraduate courses in human physiology as an adjunct professor at University of Houston–Clear Lake. In April 2008, she received the Graduate of the Last Decade (GOLD) Award from the Colorado State University College of Engineering. Ruttley is working with the National Science Foundation on an inflatable Antarctic habitat that would serve as an analog for lunar or Martian habitats.

In 2013 she was a finalist in NASA's Astronaut Selection program.

== Personal life ==
Ruttley lives in Virginia, with her husband Paul Colosky, the owner of Valeo Physical Therapy, and daughter Anna-Marie. In her spare time, Ruttley enjoys scuba diving, cooking, home-improvement projects, eating good food, and being with her husband and friends. She has bicycled from Houston to Austin, Texas, for the MS150, a fundraising event for the National Multiple Sclerosis Society. She is a certified Emergency Medical Technician and serves as a motivational speaker to undergraduates with the Council for Opportunity in Education.
