= Dominic D'Agostino =

American physiologist and neuroscientist

Dominic P. D'Agostino is an American physiologist and neuroscientist. He is a tenured associate professor in the Department of Molecular Pharmacology and Physiology at the University of South Florida Morsani College of Medicine and a research scientist at the Florida Institute for Human and Machine Cognition (IHMC). His research has focused on metabolic therapies, central nervous system oxygen toxicity, ketosis, and ketogenic interventions.

== Early life and education ==
D'Agostino received a Bachelor of Science in biological sciences and nutrition science from Rutgers University in 1998. He then received a PhD in physiology and neuroscience from the University of Medicine and Dentistry of New Jersey in 2004.

== Career ==
After completing his doctorate, D'Agostino undertook a postdoctoral fellowship in neuroscience at the Boonshoft School of Medicine of Wright State University in Ohio. In 2006, he moved his research program to the University of South Florida in Tampa, Florida as a postdoctoral fellow funded by the Office of Naval Research (ONR). He subsequently joined the USF faculty of the Department of Molecular Pharmacology and Physiology, where he became a tenured associate professor. He also holds a research appointment at the Florida Institute for Human and Machine Cognition.

NEEMO 22 Aquanaut Dominic D'Agostino during a waterwalk

D'Agostino participated in NASA's NEEMO 22 undersea habitat mission as part of a USF/IHMC research team, and provided topside crew support for NEEMO 23. His postdoctoral research was supported by the Office of Naval Research fellowship, and in 2019 he was named a Senior Member of the National Academy of Inventors.

== Research ==
D'Agostino's research has investigated metabolic approaches to conditions including central nervous system oxygen toxicity (seizures), epilepsy, neurodegenerative disease, brain cancer, and metastatic cancer. He has also investigated the physiological effects and potential applications of the ketogenic diet, ketone bodies, and exogenous ketone supplementation. With support from the Office of Naval Research, D'Agostino has studied exogenous ketones in relation to seizures caused by central nervous system oxygen toxicity, a risk associated with exposure to high partial pressures of oxygen during diving. In a 2013 study in rats, D'Agostino and colleagues reported that administration of a ketone ester delayed seizures during exposure to hyperbaric oxygen.

D'Agostino is also an inventor on patents concerning ketone-based technologies. D'Agostino has also been associated with the popularization of ketogenic diets outside academia.

D'Agostino has communicated his research through public lectures, including a TEDx talk in 2013. He has also served as principal investigator of a University of South Florida study examining metabolic health using continuous glucose monitoring.

== Selected works ==
- D'Agostino, D. P.; Pilla, R.; Held, H. E.; et al. (2013). "Therapeutic ketosis with ketone ester delays central nervous system oxygen toxicity seizures in rats". American Journal of Physiology. Regulatory, Integrative and Comparative Physiology. 304 (10): R829–R836. doi:10.1152/ajpregu.00506.2012. PMID 23552496
- Seyfried, T. N.; Flores, R. E.; Poff, A. M.; D'Agostino, D. P. (2014). "Cancer as a metabolic disease: implications for novel therapeutics". Carcinogenesis. 35 (3): 515–527. doi:10.1093/carcin/bgt480.
- Youm, Y.-H.; Nguyen, K. Y.; Grant, R. W.; et al. (2015). "The ketone metabolite β-hydroxybutyrate blocks NLRP3 inflammasome-mediated inflammatory disease". Nature Medicine. 21 (3): 263–269. doi:10.1038/nm.3804.
- Poff, A. M.; Kernagis, D.; D'Agostino, D. P. (2017). "Hyperbaric Environment: Oxygen and Cellular Damage versus Protection". Comprehensive Physiology. 7 (1): 213–234. doi:10.1002/cphy.c150032. Duraj, T.; Kalamian, M.; Zuccoli, G.; et al. (2024). "Clinical research framework proposal for ketogenic metabolic therapy in glioblastoma". BMC Medicine. 22: 578. doi:10.1186/s12916-024-03775-4.
- Noakes, T. D.; Prins, P. J.; Buga, A.; D'Agostino, D. P.; Volek, J. S.; Koutnik, A. P. (2026). "Carbohydrate Ingestion on Exercise Metabolism and Physical Performance". Endocrine Reviews. 47 (2): 191–243. doi:10.1210/endrev/bnaf038.
