= Steve Chappell =

American aerospace engineer (born 1969/1970)

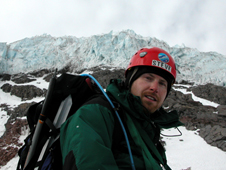
- Steve Chappell climbing Mount Rainier.
- Education: B.S., Aerospace Engineering, University of Michigan; M.S., Aerospace Engineering, University of Colorado at Boulder; PhD, University of Colorado at Boulder
- Occupation: Aerospace engineer
- Employer: Wyle Laboratories
- Known for: Aquanaut
- Title: Technical Lead & Research Specialist

Steven Patrick Chappell (born 1969/1970) is an American aerospace engineer. He is a Technical Lead & Research Specialist for Wyle Integrated Science & Engineering at NASA's Johnson Space Center (JSC) in Houston, Texas. He is helping to define and execute the research needed to optimize human performance in next-generation spacesuits and extra-vehicular activity (EVA) systems. Chappell served as an aquanaut on the NASA Extreme Environment Mission Operations 14 (NEEMO 14) crew.

== Education and early career ==
Chappell grew up in Lake Orion, MI and dreamed of space travel as a child. After graduating from Lake Orion High School in 1987, he attended the University of Michigan in Ann Arbor and earned a bachelor's degree in Aerospace Engineering Sciences, graduating in 1991. After graduating, he used his newly gained expertise to help design and develop aircraft and missile simulations to assist pilots with real-time combat decision making, but still had a strong desire to be a part of human spaceflight. This drove Chappell to move to Colorado to further his education and be closer to the mountains to develop his growing passion for rock climbing and mountaineering.

Chappell's intent upon returning to college was to become a medical doctor specializing in aerospace medicine and he began taking classes to make that possible, but being a climber led him to learn about Rocky Mountain Rescue Group based in Boulder, CO. He became a member of the all-volunteer team, one of the busiest in the country, and quickly became active performing technical rock, snow, and ice rescue missions. Over time, his involvement on the mountain rescue team fed his interest in helping people while doing something he loved and he changed his educational course to pursue bioastronautics-related graduate degrees, studying how humans perform in the harsh environment of space.

Chappell earned masters and doctoral degrees from the University of Colorado at Boulder (M.S., Aerospace Engineering, 2003; PhD, 2006), studying human performance in simulated Moon and Mars gravity. His PhD thesis was on "Analysis of Planetary Exploration Spacesuit Systems and Evaluation of a Modified Partial-Gravity Simulation Technique". While he was performing his graduate research, he worked as one of the lead systems engineers developing and launching a satellite to study cloud formation in the upper atmosphere. Also during this time, his passion for rescue led him to become the operational leader of his mountain rescue team. He has taken part in more than 350 rescue missions and also climbed many high peaks in Colorado and on international expeditions. Along the way, he attained multiple SCUBA certifications and made dives in exotic locations around the world.

Chappell worked for FAAC Incorporated as a simulation engineer from 1992 to 1996, for Lockheed Martin Space Systems Company as a systems engineer from 1997 to 2000, and for Global Commerce Systems as an engineering manager from 2000 to 2001. From 2002 to 2008 he was a mission systems engineer for the Laboratory for Atmospheric & Space Physics.

== NASA career ==
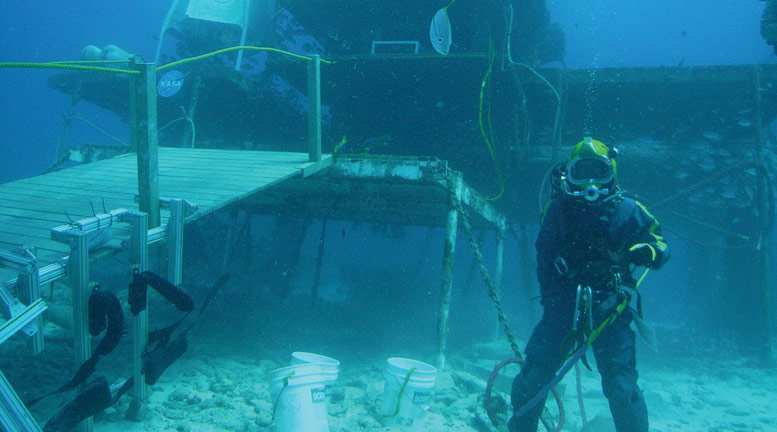
Chappell performing EVA during NEEMO 14 mission

Chappell's diverse background and experience led him to work for Wyle Integrated Science & Engineering at NASA JSC, where he has been employed since 2008. He is helping to define and execute the research needed to optimize human performance in the next-generation spacesuits and EVA systems. As part of his job, he has led and taken part in studies in different exploration analog environments including the high Arctic, parabolic flight aircraft, and partial gravity simulators at JSC. He was a major contributor to the design of the mockups and procedures to be used during NEEMO 14.

Chappell was a NASA astronaut candidate interviewee in 2009. In May 2010, Chappell became an aquanaut through his participation in the joint NASA-NOAA, NEEMO 14 (NASA Extreme Environment Mission Operations) project, an exploration research mission held in Aquarius, the world's only undersea research laboratory. Prior to the mission, Chappell was quoted as saying that he "is looking forward to working as a team with the other crewmembers during NEEMO 14 to help NASA take the next steps to push forward the frontier of space exploration."

Although Chappell works at JSC, much of his time is spent working remotely from near Boulder. He remains active with Rocky Mountain Rescue Group, having served as its operations director from 2006 to 2008 and as the president of its executive board from 2010 to 2012, and again as operations director from 2013 to the present. Chappell also enjoys running, canyoneering, reading, and painting. Chappell served as deputy mission manager for the NEEMO 15 mission in October 2011. During the NEEMO 16 mission in June 2012, Chappell served as the technical director for the near-Earth asteroid exploration EVA objectives, as an In-Water Test Director, and piloted a DeepWorker submersible.

== Memberships and honors ==
In addition to Rocky Mountain Rescue Group, Chappell's memberships include the International Council on Systems Engineering, the Society for Human Performance in Extreme Environments, the Mountain Rescue Association, and the American Institute of Aeronautics and Astronautics (AIAA). His honors include the NASA Silver Snoopy Award (2011), the AIAA Foundation Graduate Award for "Planetary EVA Operations – Research & Design" (2006), and awards from Wyle Integrated Science & Engineering, Rocky Mountain Rescue, and Lockheed Martin.
