= Craig McKinley (physician) =

Canadian physician and aquanaut

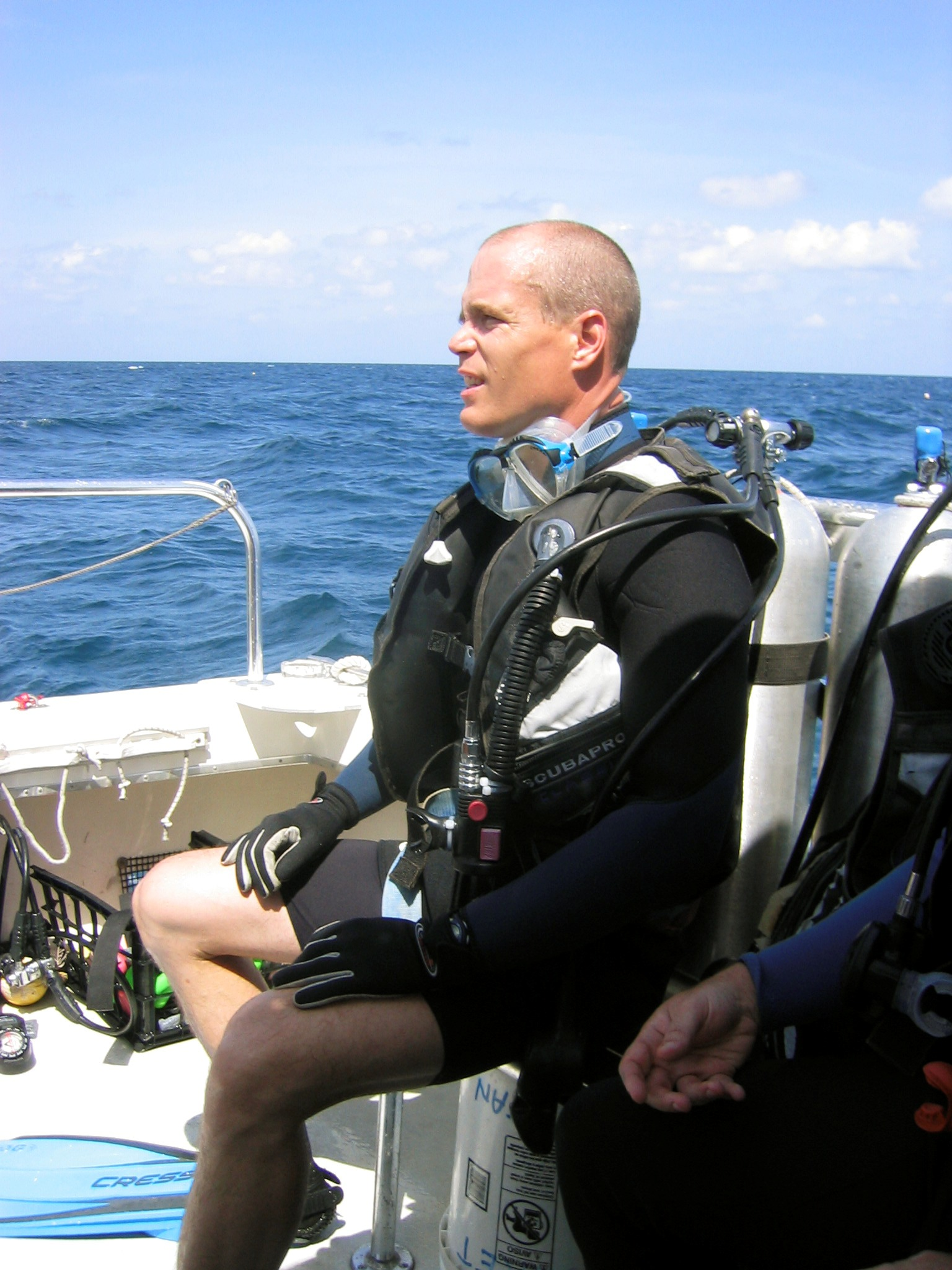
- McKinley preparing for a NEEMO 7 training dive.
- Born: Craig Anthony McKinley; July 14, 1964; Shelburne, Nova Scotia, Canada
- Died: February 18, 2013 (aged 48)
- Education: B.S., Electrical Engineering, University of New Brunswick; M.S., Biomedical Engineering, University of New Brunswick; M.D., University of Toronto
- Occupation: physician
- Employer: McMaster University
- Known for: Aquanaut
- Title: Assistant Professor
- Spouse: Susan Hegge
- Children: Samantha Mckinley Jessica McKinley
- Parent: Joseph Garland Mackinley Carol Ann Hartlen

Craig Anthony McKinley (July 14, 1964 – February 18, 2013) was a Canadian physician. On February 28, 2003, McKinley participated in the world's first telerobotic-assisted surgery, conducted at two hospitals separated by 400 kilometres. He later served as an aquanaut on the joint NASA-NOAA NEEMO 7 underwater exploration mission in October 2004, where he and other aquanauts tested remote health care procedures with potential application for space travel. McKinley experienced problems with alcohol and faced legal difficulties beginning in 2009. He lost his hospital privileges in 2011 and died in 2013.

== Early life and education ==
McKinley was born in Shelburne, Nova Scotia, Canada. He grew up in Eastern Canada, living in several different communities throughout the Maritimes.

McKinley attended the University of New Brunswick where he obtained a Bachelor of Science in Electrical Engineering, graduating with honors. Under a full National Science and Engineering Research Council postgraduate scholarship, he obtained a Master of Science in Biomedical Engineering from the University of New Brunswick, graduating with honors. He then attended the University of Toronto where he obtained his Medical Doctorate with honor standing. Following his MD, he entered the General Surgical Fellowship training program at the University of Toronto. McKinley received numerous undergraduate and postgraduate scholarships including five National Science and Engineering Research Council grants.

== Medical career ==
McKinley was formerly Faculty Staff at The Centre for Minimal Access Surgery (CMAS) at St. Joseph's Healthcare Hamilton in Hamilton, Ontario, and was an assistant professor at McMaster University in Hamilton. He was the North Bay program director of the University of Ottawa's Northern Ontario General Surgery Residency Program and developed a fellowship-training program in Advanced Laparoscopic Surgery in North Bay. McKinley sat on the Advanced Laparoscopic Surgery Committee of the Canadian Association of General Surgeons.

After entering private practice in North Bay in 1999, McKinley's main interest was the development of an advanced laparoscopic surgery program at the North Bay General Hospital. He was recognized as an expert in the feasibility of advanced laparoscopic surgery in a community hospital setting. McKinley published numerous peer-reviewed articles. His interests included the fields of telementored surgery, robotic surgery, and telerobotic surgery. McKinley was experienced at integrating these technologies into clinical practice.

On February 28, 2003, McKinley participated in the world's first telerobotic-assisted surgery conducted at two hospitals. Mehran Anvari, the founder of CMAS, used a telerobotic system at St. Joseph's Healthcare Hamilton to operate a camera and surgical tools in the operating room at North Bay General Hospital, almost 400 km away. Anvari's hand, wrist and finger movements were transmitted from Hamilton to North Bay to control the camera and instruments. McKinley positioned the instruments in North Bay and controlled the electrocautery energy source. The two doctors successfully completed a laparoscopic Nissen fundoplication surgery on a patient named Claudette Fortier.

== Aquanaut ==
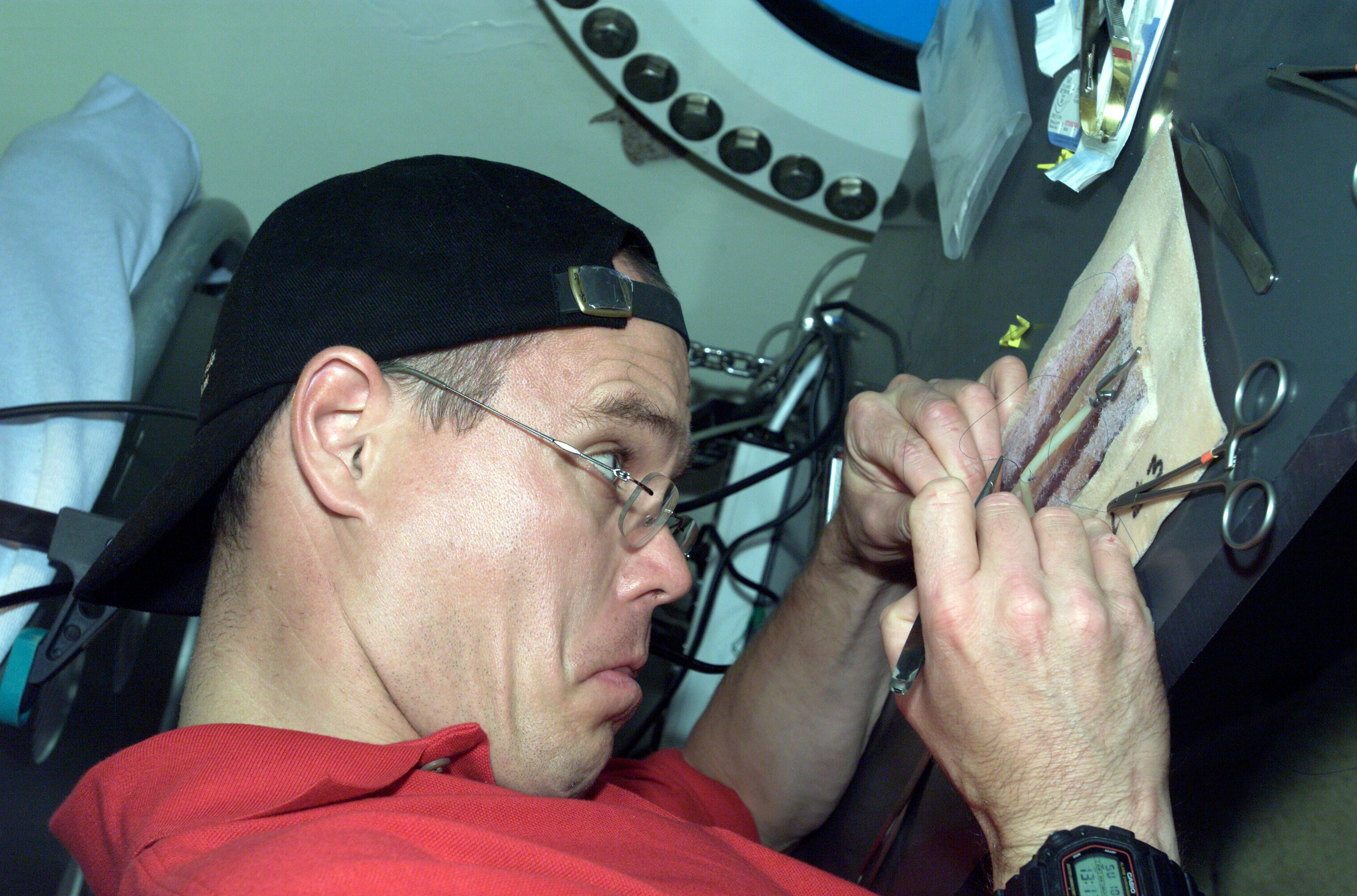
McKinley practicing a suturing technique inside the Aquarius habitat.

In October 2004, McKinley, a recreational diver, became an aquanaut through his participation in the joint NASA-NOAA, NEEMO 7 (NASA Extreme Environment Mission Operations) project, an exploration research mission held in Aquarius, the world's only undersea research laboratory. McKinley was the Canadian Space Agency's co-principal investigator for NEEMO 7, along with Mehran Anvari. During the mission, McKinley wrote: "It is difficult to explain what it is like living in an underwater habitat... when something passes by our windows, it is not a bird but rather a fish. And when we leave our home, we don't go for a walk but rather a swim. It must be as strange for the fish as it is for us!"

During the NEEMO 7 mission, McKinley and the other aquanauts tested remote health care procedures on a patient simulator in cooperation with CMAS. From thousands of miles away at St. Joseph's Healthcare in Hamilton, Anvari and other doctors guided the aquanauts as they performed surgeries on a patient simulator. Doctors in Hamilton also remotely controlled robotic instruments to do the work. The techniques simulated during NEEMO 7 can be used in remote settings on Earth, and may one day be used to respond to emergencies on the International Space Station, the moon, or Mars. The procedures simulated during the mission included ultrasound diagnosis, abscess drainage and a kidney stone extraction.

== Legal troubles ==
In April 2009, McKinley was arrested in North Bay, Ontario on assault charges.

In September 2010 McKinley pleaded guilty to a criminal charge of drunk driving in Parry Sound, Ontario, on November 12, 2008. On April 8, 2009, McKinley was arrested in North Bay by detectives in the Investigative Section of the North Bay Police Service. He was charged with eight counts of assault, criminal harassment and uttering threats. On August 4, 2010, McKinley failed to stop for police on the highway between Parry Sound and Sudbury, Ontario. The Ontario Provincial Police called off their pursuit when McKinley, driving a Porsche, reached a speed of over 200 km/hour. He was arrested several hours later and spent three days in custody. McKinley pleaded guilty to a provincial offence for this incident in September 2010, at the same time he pleaded guilty to drunk driving, and agreed to pay nearly $10,000 in fines and a charitable donation. He was also placed on probation for a year.

From August 20, 2010, to April 13, 2011, McKinley was suspended from practicing medicine by an executive committee with the College of Physicians and Surgeons of Ontario. During this period McKinley, who was experiencing problems with alcohol, received treatment at the Homewood Health Centre in Guelph, Ontario, which specializes in addiction treatment. In January 2011, McKinley was arrested for violating a bail condition and obstructing justice by attempting to dissuade a witness from giving evidence. He later admitted to sending the witness two e-mails on January 8, 2011, threatening her with a public mischief charge and suggesting he would endanger her job by complaining to the organization overseeing her profession. He also urged her to make the Crown's office withdraw a complaint against him. However, the same month McKinley's assault charges were stayed by Superior Court Justice Paul Rivard because the district Crown's office had prejudiced his right to a fair trial. The Crown's office could not show it had responded to seven written requests from McKinley's lawyer to disclose evidence on the assault charges.

In May 2011 he was placed on probation for obstructing justice. He also lost his hospital privileges in Ontario.

Craig McKinley died suddenly on February 18, 2013.

== Family ==
Craig McKinley was the son of Joseph Garland McKinley and Carol Ann Hartlen. McKinley was the brother of Michele Dana McClare and James Andrew McKinley. He had two daughters with spouse Susan Hegge, Samantha McKinley and Jessica McKinley.
