= Andrew Abercromby =

Biomedical engineer from Scotland working for NASA

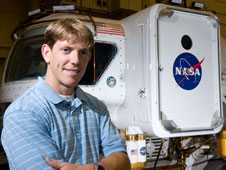
- Abercromby in front of Lunar Excursion Vehicle
- Born: Andrew Frank Abercromby; 12 May 1980 (age 46); Dundee, Scotland
- Education: University of Edinburgh (MEng); University of Houston (PhD, Kinesiology)
- Occupations: Scientist and biomedical engineer
- Employer: NASA
- Known for: Aquanaut

Andrew Frank Jorgensen Abercromby (born 12 May 1980) is a Scottish scientist and biomedical engineer who designs and tests spacesuit systems and exercise countermeasures for future exploration of the Solar System. He is employed by NASA as Lead of the Human Physiology, Performance, Protection & Operations (H-3PO) Laboratory at Johnson Space Center in Houston, Texas. As an aquanaut, Abercromby served as a member of the NASA Extreme Environment Mission Operations 14 (NEEMO 14) crew. Abercromby has more than fifteen years of experience working in the Human Health and Performance (HH&P) and Engineering Directorates at the Johnson Space Center. He is married with two daughters.

== Education ==
Growing up in a small fishing village in Scotland, Abercromby played football, rugby, and cricket. He was not interested in space exploration until the age of 17. While attending Buckhaven High School in Fife, Scotland, he was offered the chance to fly to the United States and join an International Space School at NASA's Johnson Space Center. Abercromby had never been on an aircraft before. His host while in Houston was Chris Hadfield, an astronaut from the Canadian Space Agency (CSA). After spending two weeks at NASA, Abercromby knew what he wanted to do with the rest of his life.

Because no aerospace degree was available in Scotland, after leaving high school, Abercromby studied mechanical engineering at the University of Edinburgh, while trying to figure out a way to become involved in space exploration, and perhaps fly in space himself one day. After much study, part-time jobs, and some pilot training with the reserves of the Royal Air Force, Abercromby was employed by NASA. Abercromby received an award as best graduate student from the Institute of Mechanical Engineers (IME). He received an MEng in Mechanical Engineering from the University of Edinburgh in 2002. In 2006, Abercromby received a PhD in Kinesiology from the University of Houston. He was honoured as a Distinguished Alumnus by the university's Department of Health and Human Performance (HHP) in 2007.

== NASA career ==
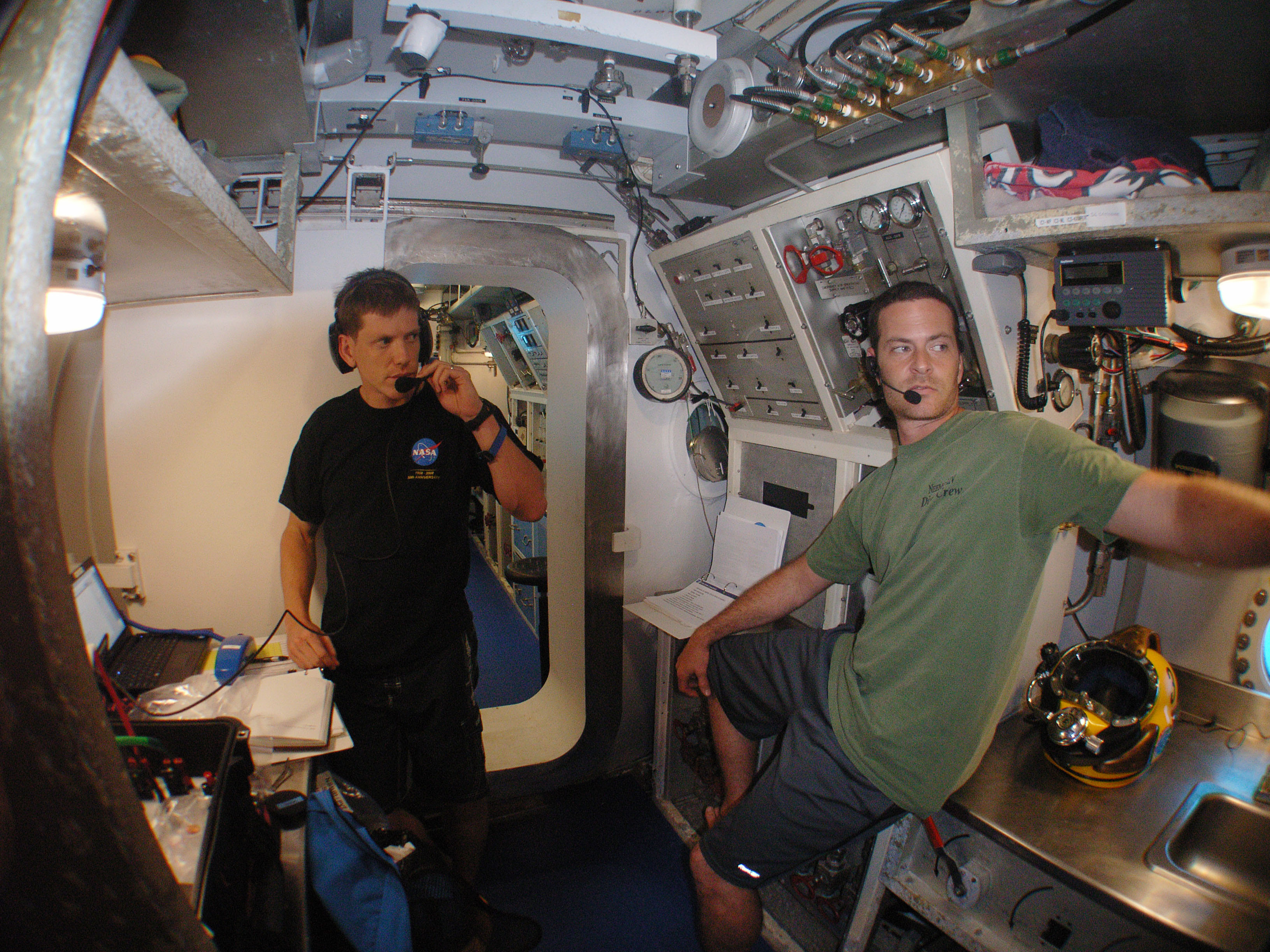
Abercromby and Aquarius habitat technician Nate Bender performing communication checks during NEEMO 14 mission.

As a biomedical engineer and deputy project manager for the Space Exploration Vehicle (SEV) project, Abercromby was part of a team designing and testing a new type of human space exploration vehicle. Abercromby was also a member of the Extra-Vehicular Activity (EVA) Physiology, Systems and Performance project, which helped develop new spacesuits that will be safer, more efficient, and easier to use. Abercromby has also worked in NASA's Neurosciences Laboratory, Anthropometry and Biomechanics Facility, and Flight Mechanics Laboratory.

Abercromby has worked on NASA analogue missions in the Arizona desert and on the Haughton–Mars Project in the High Arctic. He has also worked aboard reduced-gravity research aircraft, and on the Pavilion Lake Research Project, investigating a remote lake in British Columbia, Canada. In May 2010, Abercromby became an aquanaut through his participation in the joint NASA-NOAA, NEEMO 14 (NASA Extreme Environment Mission Operations) project, an exploration research mission held in Aquarius, the world's only undersea research laboratory. The NEEMO 14 mission was commanded by Chris Hadfield, Abercromby's host on his first visit to Houston thirteen years earlier. Prior to the NEEMO 14 mission, Abercromby was quoted as saying that he "expects to learn a lot about himself by living and working as part of an underwater team for two weeks. He expects it to be a lot of work but plans on enjoying the unique experience." Abercromby celebrated his 30th birthday during the NEEMO 14 mission.

Abercromby was a member of NASA's Desert Research and Technology Studies (Desert RATS) 2010 Mission Support Team. He was responsible for ensuring that all experimental procedures were followed, and that all of the data was collected. Abercromby was a member of the support team for the NEEMO 15 mission in October 2011. During the NEEMO 16 mission in June 2012, Abercromby served as an In-Water Test Director, and piloted a DeepWorker submersible. In 2013, Abercromby participated as a field engineer and research diver in the Tawani International Antarctic Expedition (part of the Russian Antarctic Expedition), led by Dr. Dale Anderson. The five person expedition involved underwater exploration of perennially ice-covered lakes, Lake Obersee and Lake Untersee, using scuba diving, remotely operated underwater vehicles (ROVs), and other sampling techniques.

Abercromby is now the Associate Chief Health and Performance Officer at the NASA Moon to Mars program.
