= Jonathan Dory =

Human Systems Integration Lead at NASA's Johnson Space Center

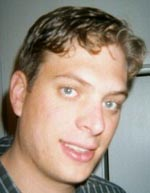
- Jonathan Dory
- Born: 1975 (age 50–51)
- Education: B.S., Civil Engineering, Colorado State University
- Employer: NASA/Johnson Space Center
- Known for: Aquanaut
- Title: Human Systems Integration Lead
- Spouse(s): 2007 (Harris, Texas)

Jonathan Robert Dory is a Human Systems Integration Lead at NASA's Johnson Space Center (JSC) in Houston, Texas. He is Branch Chief of NASA's Habitability and Human Factors Branch, part of the Habitability and Environmental Factors Division at NASA/JSC. Dory supports crew safety and productivity on the International Space Station (ISS) Program by planning and assessing the on-orbit interior configuration of ISS, as well as performing anthropometric analysis of crew tasks. He contributes to the integrated operation of the Space Station while using 3D computer graphics and animation software as part of his daily work. In July 2002, Dory served as an aquanaut on the NASA Extreme Environment Mission Operations 3 (NEEMO 3) crew.

== Education and career path ==
Dory grew up in Colorado Springs, Colorado. He spent his childhood camping, hiking, and backpacking in the Rocky Mountains. Dory graduated from Mitchell High School in Colorado Springs and attended Colorado State University, where in 2000 he received a B.S. in civil engineering, with a particular interest in structures.

Dory's interest in the space program led him to participate in a number of activities while pursuing his degree. As a member and officer of the American Institute of Aeronautics and Astronautics, he worked with other similarly interested students to build prototype exercise devices for use in space, and had the opportunity to test them in simulated microgravity aboard NASA's "zero-g" aircraft, the KC-135. Dory was also active in programs sponsored by the Colorado Space Grant Consortium, including the Citizen Explorer Satellite, a student-designed and built spacecraft, which measures global atmospheric ozone concentrations and transmits its data directly to classrooms throughout the United States.

== Analog missions ==
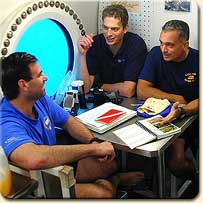
NEEMO 3 aquanauts in Aquarius. Left to right: Gregory Chamitoff, Dory, John D. Olivas. Not shown: Commander Jeffrey Williams, support crew Byron Croker and Michael Smith.

In March 2002, Dory took part as a volunteer in a simulation activity for a human mission to Mars at the Mars Desert Research Station (MDRS) in Utah.

In July 2002, Dory became an aquanaut through his participation in the joint NASA-NOAA, NEEMO 3 (NASA Extreme Environment Mission Operations) project, an exploration research mission held in Aquarius, the world's only undersea research laboratory. The NEEMO 3 mission objective was to build crew and mission control communication techniques, and provide leadership and interpersonal skills training for everyone involved. Among other activities, Dory took part in the underwater construction of a prefabricated structure as an analog to EVA assembly operations on the International Space Station. Dory wrote during the mission, "I recall the surreal feeling of looking at our new home, blue sky above filled with a school of 1 1/2 meter barracuda for clouds, and a big yellow life support buoy for a sun. What a truly unique place this is to live and work." The NEEMO 3 aquanauts also took part in a phone call with the crew of the International Space Station as it passed over the North Atlantic. Dory was subsequently a member of the support staff for the NEEMO 5 mission in June 2003.

== Personal life ==
Dory lives in Seabrook, Texas. He enjoys reading science and technology books, teaching himself to play guitar, drawing the human form, weightlifting, SCUBA diving, snowboarding and rock climbing. Dory aspires to contribute to the success of long duration human missions to Mars and beyond. He is 6 feet 7 inches tall, and thus too tall to become an astronaut.
