= Justin Brown (aquanaut) =

American professional aquanaut and habitat technician

- Born: Streator, Illinois
- Education: Florida State University
- Occupation: Aquanaut

Justin Brown is an American professional aquanaut with the University of North Carolina Wilmington (UNCW). He serves as a habitat technician at Aquarius Reef Base, the world's only undersea research laboratory.

== Early life and education ==
Brown was born in Streator, Illinois, but moved to Central Florida while in middle school. He received a degree in criminology from Florida State University (FSU), where he also minored in biology. After a two-week internship at Aquarius Reef Base through FSU's Underwater Crime Scene Investigation dive classes in 2006, Brown interned for an entire semester at Aquarius and was then offered a permanent position. He eventually became a senior member of the dive team.

== Aquarius ==
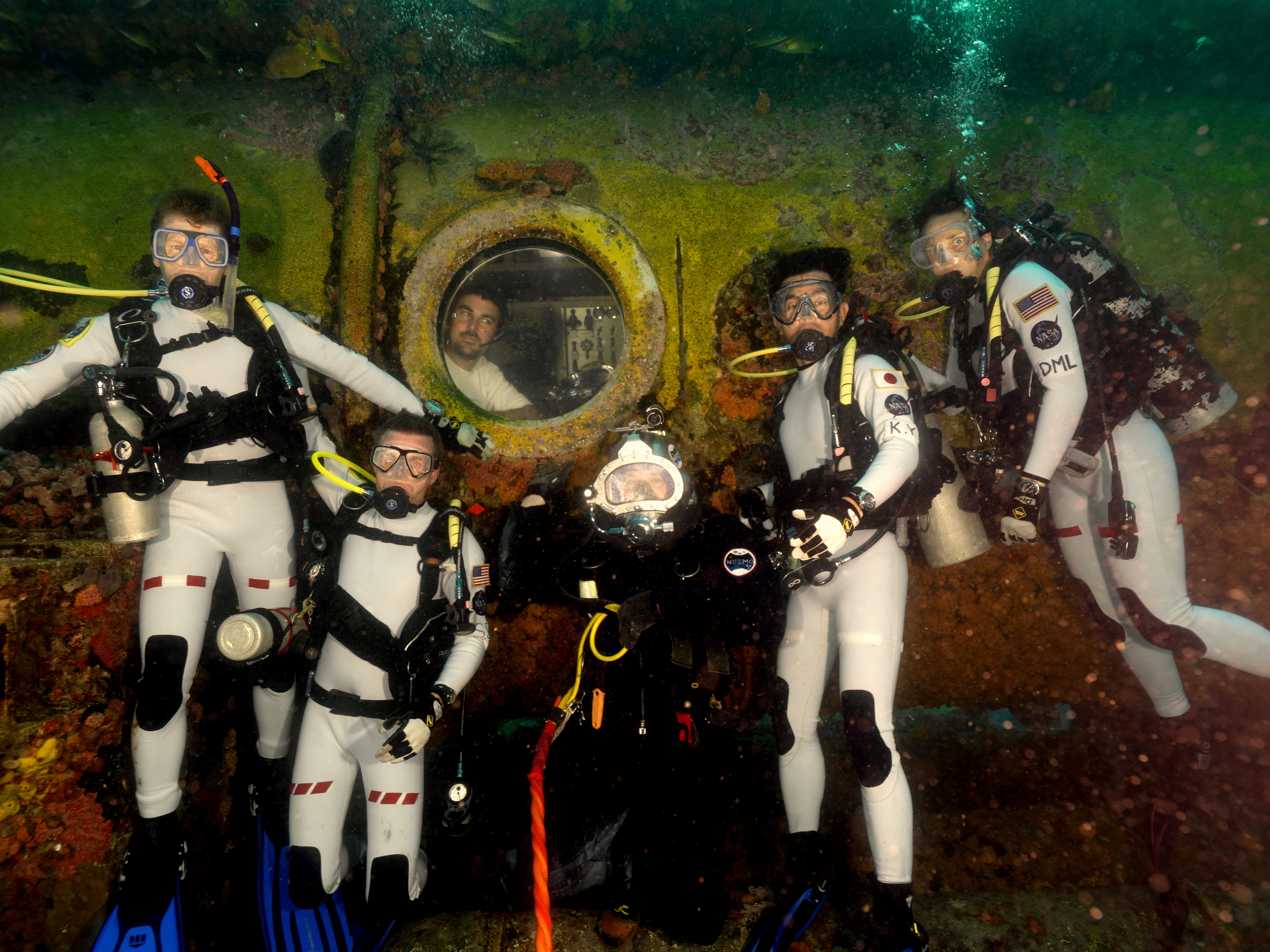
The NEEMO 16 crew: Left to right: Timothy Peake, Steve Squyres, Brown, Kimiya Yui, Dorothy Metcalf-Lindenburger; inside habitat: James Talacek.

Talacek serves as a habitat technician at Aquarius Reef Base for the National Undersea Research Center (NURC), maintaining the daily operations of Aquarius. In a July 2011 blog entry, Brown commented, "When the idea of what we do sets in I get the typical responses of 'that's the coolest job ever' or 'wow, I've never knew stuff like that existed.'"

As a habitat technician during Aquarius missions, Brown's responsibilities include habitat operations and maintenance, including carrying out dives to maintain the exterior of the habitat. He also monitors life support systems, communicates with the crew on shore, and acts as a divemaster for the scientists aboard Aquarius. In August 2009, during the investigation of the death of Aquarius aquanaut Dewey Smith, Brown served as safety observer in an underwater test in which the hydraulic hammer in use near Smith at the time of his fatal accident was again used underwater in the vicinity of an Inspiration closed circuit rebreather (CCR) similar to the one Smith had been using.

In June 2012, Brown took part as a habitat technician in the NASA Extreme Environment Mission Operations 16 (NEEMO 16) mission, one of a series of NASA-NOAA missions which use Aquarius as an analog environment for space exploration. The NEEMO 16 crew lived and worked underwater aboard Aquarius for twelve days, simulating techniques to be used by astronauts on a future mission to an asteroid.

== Personal life ==
Brown lives in Homestead, Florida with his girlfriend and their goldendoodle. He has volunteered as a coach with the Coral Shores High School wrestling team and has run 5k, half marathon, triathlon and adventure races.
