= Karen Kohanowich =

American aquanaut and ex US Navy diver

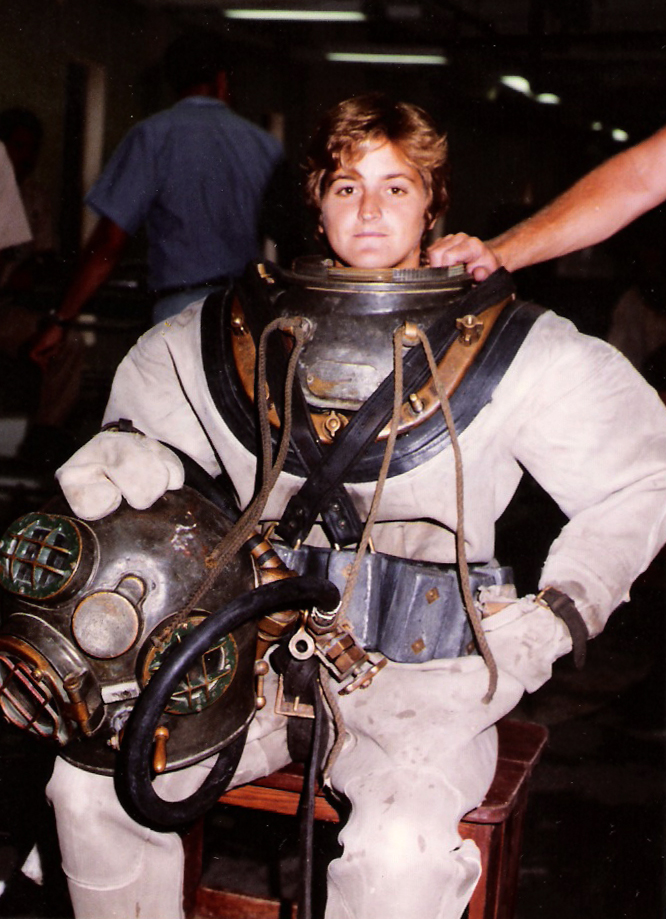
- Karen Kohanowich wearing a Mark V diving rig during her service in the U.S. Navy.
- Education: B.S., Geology, Vanderbilt University; M.S., Air Ocean Science, Naval Postgraduate School; M.S., Environmental Science and Policy, Johns Hopkins University; PhD, Environmental Science and Policy, George Mason University;
- Employer: National Oceanic and Atmospheric Administration
- Known for: U.S. Navy Salvage Diver, Aquanaut

Karen Kohanowich is a retired U.S. Naval officer and ocean research and technology program manager for the National Oceanic and Atmospheric Administration (NOAA)'s Office of Ocean Exploration and Research (OER). She was NOAA's Acting Director of the National Undersea Research Program (NURP) from 2006 to 2009, and served in various roles at OER, including Acting Deputy and Undersea Technology director, until retiring in 2018. In July 2006, she became an aquanaut on the NASA Extreme Environment Mission Operations 10 (NEEMO 10) crew.

Before NOAA, Kohanowich served as a salvage diving officer and oceanographer in the United States Navy for 23 years, retiring at the rank of Commander. Kohanowich later commented, "What really got me into diving was that the standards for women were the same [as for men]. Women had to do the same number of sit-ups and push-ups. They had to climb up and down the dive ladders wearing the same 200-pound Mark V dive system."

== Navy career ==
As a midshipman, Kohanowich supported 1000 ft saturation dives at the Navy's Experimental Diving Unit. From 1982 to 1993 she served as a U.S. Navy Salvage Diver, completing Navy Salvage and Mixed Gas Diving School in 1983. From 1986 to 1988 she served as Diving and Operations Officer aboard the salvage ship USS Safeguard. In 1989 Kohanowich became a National Association of Underwater Instructors instructor. In 1993 she qualified as a pilot of the submersible Pisces IV. From 1995 to 1997 she was stationed in Yokosuka, Japan as a Meteorology and Oceanographic (METOC) Officer. From 1997 to 2005, Kohanowich was a Marine Policy Advisor, working with the Oceanographer of the Navy and the Deputy Assistant Secretary of the Navy (Environment) and serving as Navy liaison to NOAA. From 2002 to 2005, she served as Ocean Resources Advisor to the Assistant Secretary of the Navy.

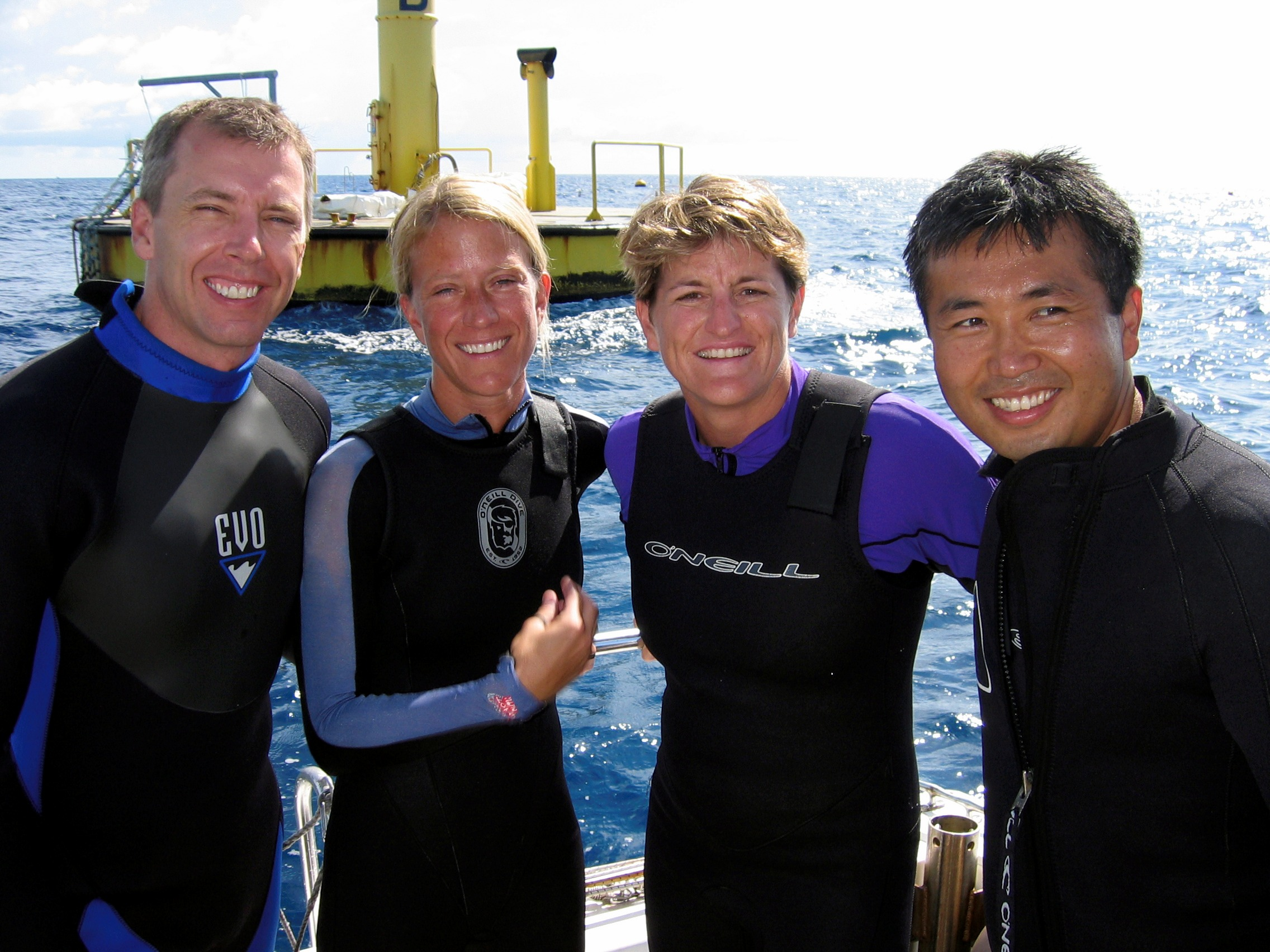
The NEEMO 10 crew. Left to right: Andrew J. Feustel, Karen L. Nyberg, Kohanowich, Koichi Wakata.

== NOAA and NEEMO ==
In 2005 Kohanowich retired from the Navy and joined NOAA as the deputy director of NURP. She also served as VP for Government and Public Affairs for the Marine Technology Society from 2005 to 2009.

In July 2006, Kohanowich became an aquanaut through her participation in the joint NASA-NOAA, NEEMO 10 (NASA Extreme Environment Mission Operations) project, an exploration research mission held in Aquarius, the world's only undersea research laboratory. Kohanowich and her crewmates lived and worked underwater for seven days. Kohanowich was nicknamed "K2" during the mission.

== Education and honors ==
Kohanowich received a Bachelor of Science degree in Geology from Vanderbilt University in 1982, a Master of Science in Air Ocean Science from the Naval Postgraduate School in 1995, and a Master of Science in Environmental Science and Policy from Johns Hopkins University in 2005. She completed her Ph.D. in Environmental Science and Policy at George Mason University in 2016. Her dissertation is titled "Cousteau to Cameron: A Quadrant Model for Assessment of Undersea Marine Research Infrastructure." http://digilib.gmu.edu/jspui/handle/1920/10601

In March 2011, when Kohanowich gave a Women's History Month lecture at the Office of Naval Research, Rear Admiral Nevin Carr commented of Kohanowich: "She is a trailblazer in her field and her achievements are a positive reflection of how important contributions from women have advanced the sciences, and benefitted the Navy."

Kohanowich served as vice president for Government and Public Affairs for the Marine Technology Society from 2005 to 2010, and as Chair of the Washington, DC Chapter of the Society of Woman Geographers from 2014 to 2017 She has been a member of the Women Divers Hall of Fame since 2001.
