= NEEMO =

NASA Extreme Environment Mission Operation project

Coordinates: 24°57′00″N 80°27′13″W

NEEMO Program
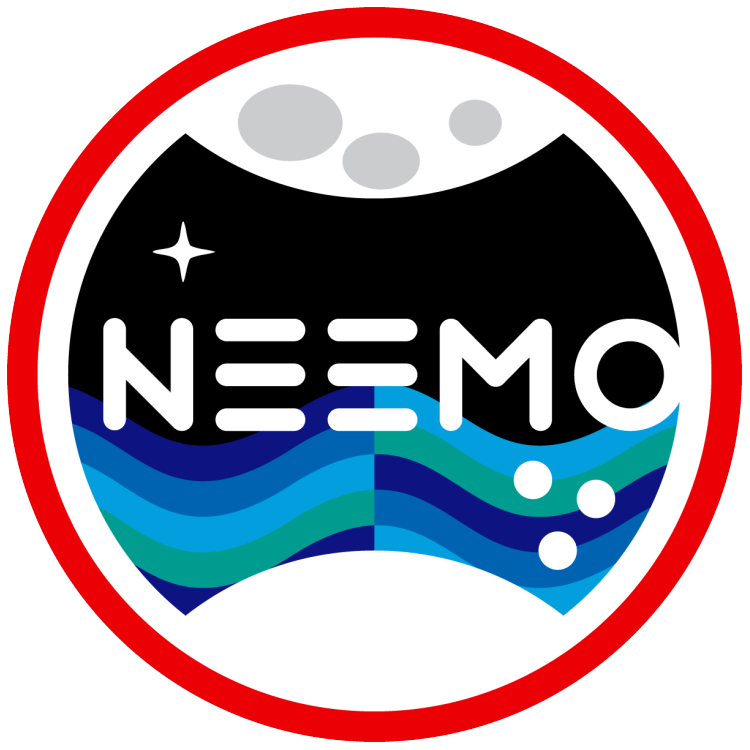

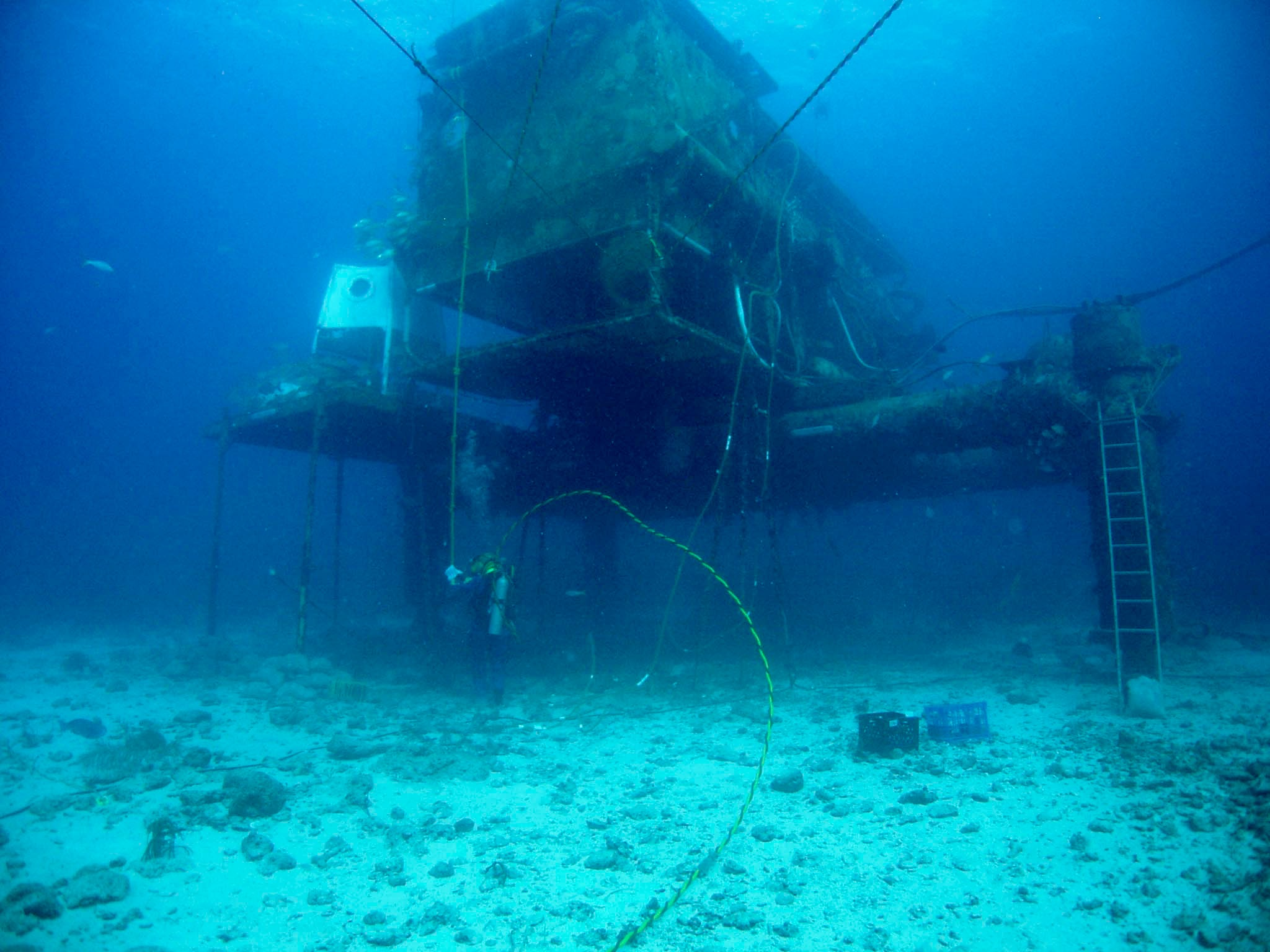
- A NEEMO 11 crewmember works outside the undersea habitat "Aquarius"
- Mission statement: "To see what extreme environmental challenges astronauts may face in space, and to form solutions by using the ocean, as an equivalent environment on earth"
- Location: Florida, United States
- Owner: NASA, Florida International University, Aquarius Reef Base
- Established: 2001
- Website: www.nasa.gov/mission/neemo/

NASA Extreme Environment Mission Operations, or NEEMO, is a NASA analog mission that sends groups of astronauts, engineers and scientists to live in the Aquarius underwater laboratory, the world's only undersea research station, for up to three weeks at a time in preparation for future space exploration.

Aquarius is an underwater habitat 3.5 miles (5.6 km) off Key Largo, Florida, in the Florida Keys National Marine Sanctuary. It is deployed on the ocean floor next to deep coral reefs 62 feet (19 m) below the surface.

NASA has used it since 2001 for a series of space exploration simulation missions, usually lasting 7 to 14 days, with space research mainly conducted by international astronauts. The mission had cost about 500 million U.S. dollars. The crew members are called aquanauts (as they live underwater at depth pressure for a period equal to or greater than 24 continuous hours without returning to the surface), and they perform EVAs in the underwater environment. A technique known as saturation diving allows the aquanauts to live and work underwater for days or weeks at a time. After twenty four hours underwater at any depth, the human body becomes saturated with dissolved gas. With saturation diving, divers can accurately predict exactly how much time they need to decompress before returning to the surface. This information limits the risk of decompression sickness. By living in the Aquarius habitat and working at the same depth on the ocean floor, NEEMO crews are able to remain underwater for the duration of their mission.

For NASA, the Aquarius habitat and its surroundings provide a convincing analog for space exploration. Much like space, the undersea world is a hostile, alien place for humans to live. NEEMO crew members experience some of the same challenges there that they would on a distant asteroid, planet (i.e. Mars) or Moon. During NEEMO missions, the aquanauts are able to simulate living on a spacecraft and test spacewalk techniques for future space missions. Working in space and underwater environments requires extensive planning and sophisticated equipment. The underwater condition has the additional benefit of allowing NASA to "weight" the aquanauts to simulate different gravity environments.

Until 2012, Aquarius was owned by the National Oceanic and Atmospheric Administration (NOAA) and operated by the National Undersea Research Center (NURC) at the University of North Carolina–Wilmington as a marine biology study base.

Since 2013, Aquarius is owned by Florida International University (FIU). As part of the FIU Marine Education and Research Initiative, the Medina Aquarius Program is dedicated to the study and preservation of marine ecosystems worldwide and is enhancing the scope and impact of FIU on research, educational outreach, technology development, and professional training. At the heart of the program is the Aquarius Reef Base.

== Missions ==
=== NEEMO 1: October 21–27, 2001 ===
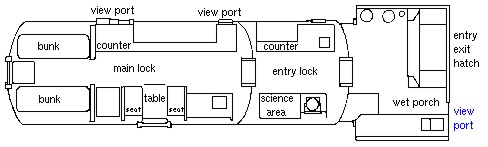
Floorplan of Aquarius.

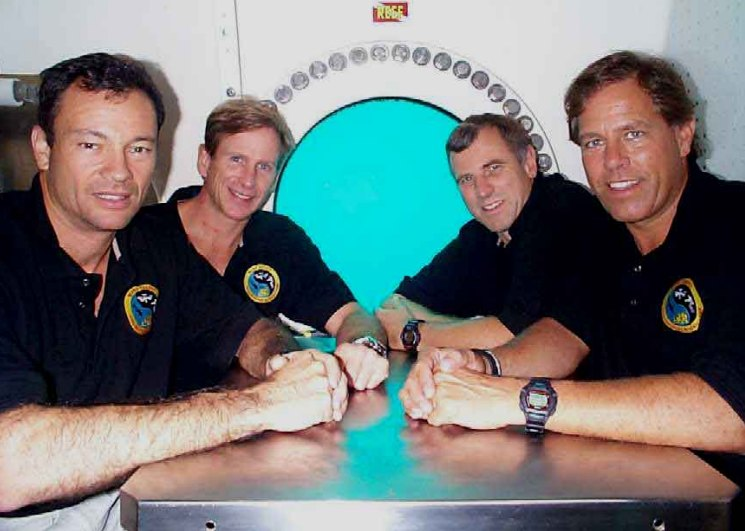
The first NEEMO crew, L–R: in front, Mike López-Alegría and Bill Todd, in back, Mike Gernhardt and Dave Williams

NASA Aquanaut Crew:

- Bill Todd (United States) , Commander
- Michael L. Gernhardt (United States)
- Michael López-Alegría (United States)
- Dafydd Williams, (Canada) CSA

NURC Support Crew:

- Mark Hulsbeck (United States)
- Ryan Snow (United States)

=== NEEMO 2: May 13–20, 2002 ===
NASA Aquanaut Crew:

- Michael Fincke (United States) , Commander
- Daniel M. Tani (United States)
- Sunita Williams (United States)
- Marc Reagan (United States)

NURC Support Crew:

- Thor Dunmire (United States)
- Ryan Snow (United States)

=== NEEMO 3: July 15–21, 2002 ===
NASA Aquanaut Crew:

- Jeffrey Williams (United States) , Commander
- Gregory Chamitoff (United States)
- John D. Olivas (United States)
- Jonathan Dory (United States)

NURC Support Crew:

- Byron Croker (United States)
- Michael Smith (United States)

=== NEEMO 4: September 23–27, 2002 ===
NASA Aquanaut Crew:

- Scott Kelly (United States) , Commander
- Paul Hill (United States)
- Rex Walheim (United States)
- Jessica Meir (United States)

NURC Support Crew:

- James Talacek (United States)
- Ryan Snow (United States)

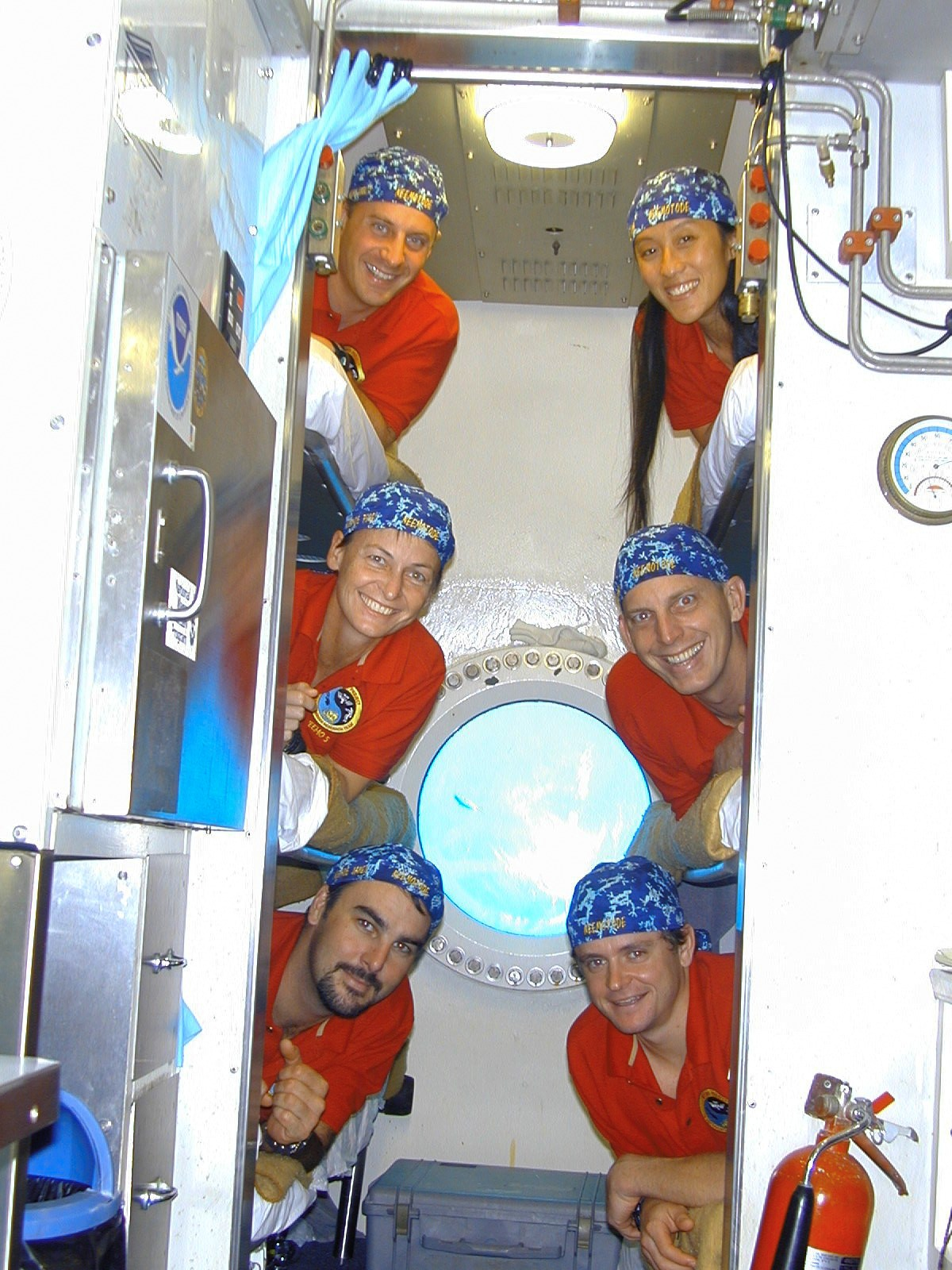
NEEMO 5 crew members are pictured in the bunkroom aboard the Aquarius research habitat. Top, L–R: Reisman, Hwang; Middle: Whitson, Anderson; Bottom: Talacek, Snow.

=== NEEMO 5: June 16–29, 2003 ===
NASA Aquanaut Crew:

- Peggy Whitson (United States) , Commander
- Clayton Anderson (United States)
- Garrett Reisman (United States)
- Emma Hwang (United States)

NURC Support Crew:

- James Talacek (United States)
- Ryan Snow (United States)

=== NEEMO 6: July 12–21, 2004 ===
NASA Aquanaut Crew:

- John Herrington (United States) , Commander
- Nicholas Patrick (United States)
- Douglas H. Wheelock (United States)
- Tara Ruttley (United States)

NURC Support Crew:

- Craig B. Cooper (United States)
- Joseph March, (United States)
- Marc Reagan, Mission Director

=== NEEMO 7: October 11–21, 2004 ===
NASA Aquanaut Crew:

- Robert Thirsk (Canada) , Commander
- Catherine Coleman (United States)
- Michael R. Barratt (United States)
- Craig McKinley (United States)

NURC Support Crew:

- James Talacek (United States)
- Billy Cooksey (United States)
- Bill Todd, Mission Director

=== NEEMO 8: April 20–22, 2005 ===
NASA Aquanaut Crew:

- Michael L. Gernhardt (United States) , Commander
- John D. Olivas (United States)
- Scott Kelly (United States)
- Monika Schultz (United States)

NURC Support Crew:

- Craig B. Cooper (United States)
- Joseph March (United States)
- Bill Todd, Mission Director

=== NEEMO 9: April 3–20, 2006 ===
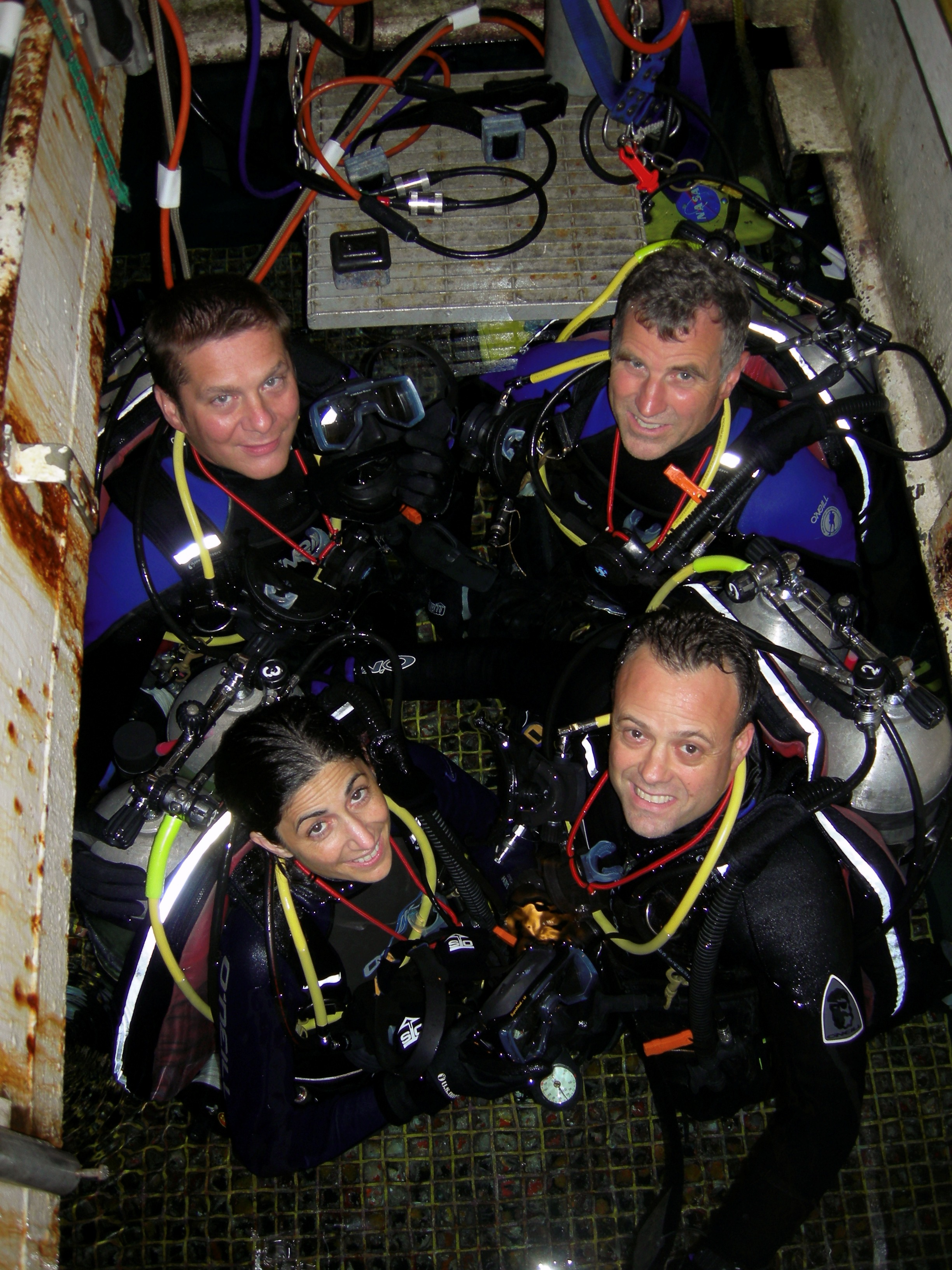
The NEEMO 9 crew: Left to right (rear): Broderick, Williams; front: Stott, Garan.

NASA Aquanaut Crew:

- Dafydd Williams (Canada) , Commander
- Nicole P. Stott (United States)
- Ronald J. Garan Jr. (United States)
- Timothy J. Broderick (United States) , M.D.

NURC Support Crew:

- James F. Buckley (United States)
- Ross Hein (United States)
- Marc Reagan, Mission Director

=== NEEMO 10: July 22–28, 2006 ===
NASA Aquanaut Crew:

- Koichi Wakata, Commander
- Andrew Feustel
- Karen L. Nyberg
- Karen Kohanowich

NURC Support Crew:

- Mark Hulsbeck
- Dominic Landucci
- Marc Reagan, Mission Director

=== NEEMO 11: September 16–22, 2006 ===
NASA Aquanaut Crew:

- Sandra Magnus, Commander
- Timothy Kopra
- Robert L. Behnken
- Timothy Creamer

NURC Support Crew:

- Larry Ward
- Roger Garcia
- Marc Reagan, Mission Director

=== NEEMO 12: May 7–18, 2007 ===
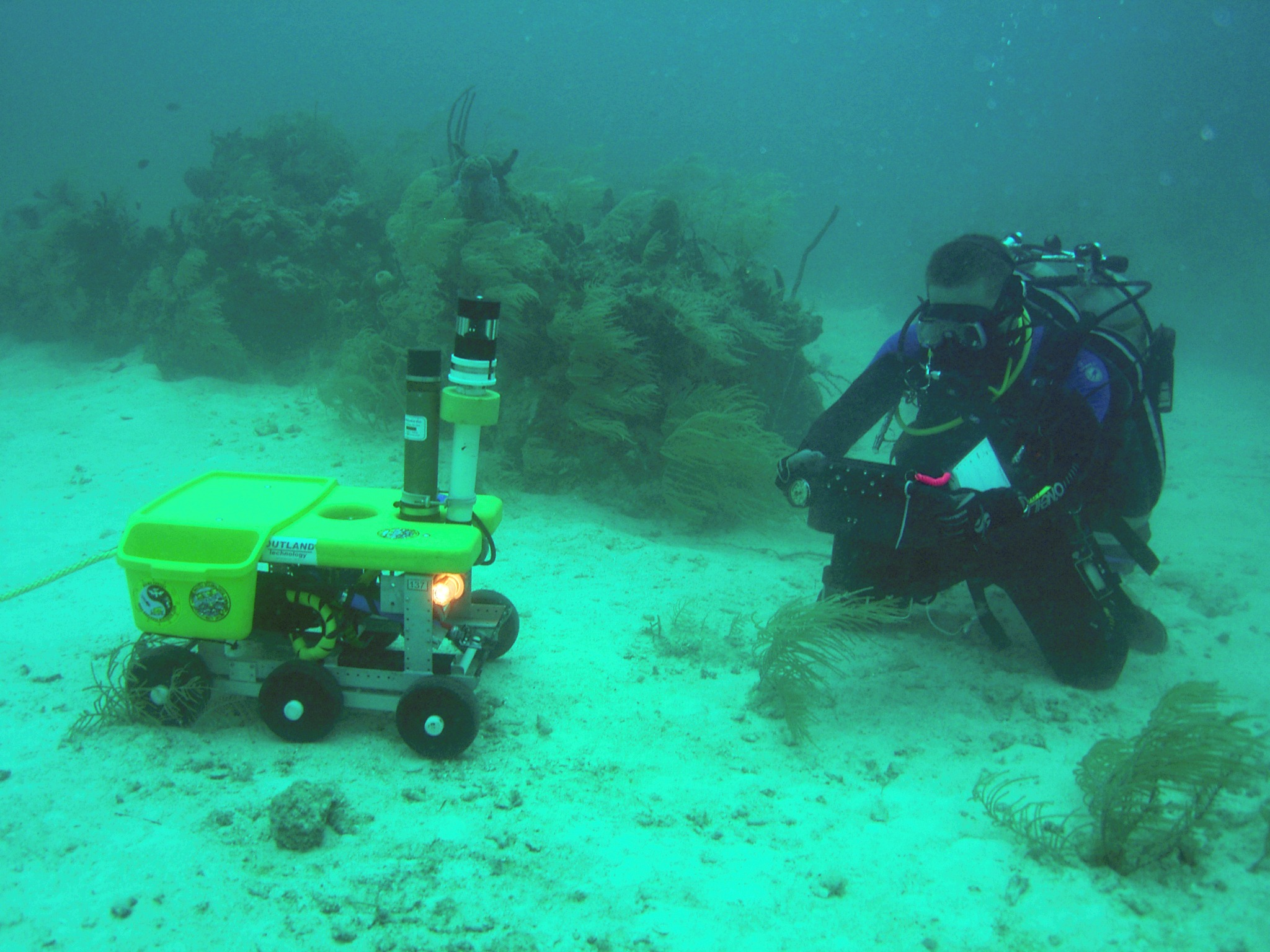
NEEMO 12 aquanaut Broderick works with a remotely operated vehicle (ROV), called Scuttle.

NASA Aquanaut Crew:

- Heidemarie Stefanyshyn-Piper, Commander
- José M. Hernández
- Josef Schmid, M.D.
- Timothy J. Broderick, M.D.

NURC Support Crew:

- Dominic Landucci
- James Talacek
- Marc Reagan, Mission Director

=== NEEMO 13: August 6–15, 2007 ===
NASA Aquanaut Crew:

- Nicholas Patrick, Commander
- Richard R. Arnold
- Satoshi Furukawa
- Christopher E. Gerty

NURC Support Crew:

- James F. Buckley
- Dewey Smith
- Marc Reagan, Mission Director

=== NEEMO 14: May 10–23, 2010 ===
NASA Aquanaut Crew:

- Chris Hadfield, Commander
- Thomas H. Marshburn
- Andrew Abercromby
- Steve Chappell

Aquarius Reef Base support crew:

- James Talacek
- Nate Bender
- Bill Todd, Mission Director

=== NEEMO 15: October 20–26, 2011 ===
NASA Aquanaut Crew:

- Shannon Walker, Commander
- Takuya Onishi
- David Saint-Jacques
- Steve Squyres

Aquarius Reef Base support crew:

- James Talacek
- Nate Bender

DeepWorker 2000 submersible crew:

- Stanley G. Love
- Richard R. Arnold
- Michael L. Gernhardt

=== NEEMO 16: June 11–22, 2012 ===
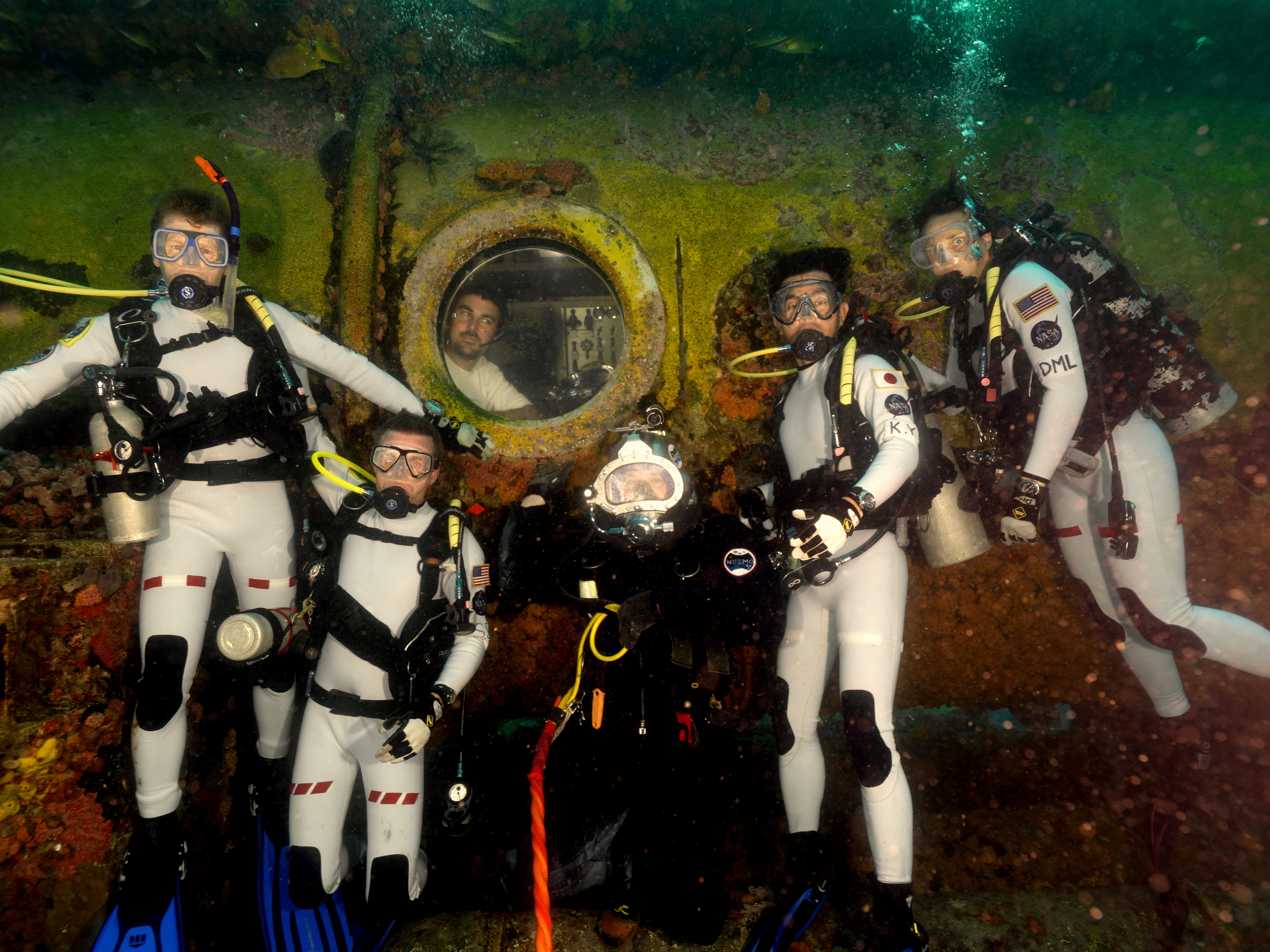
The NEEMO 16 crew: Left to right: Peake, Squyres, Brown, Yui, Metcalf-Lindenburger; inside habitat: Talacek.

NASA Aquanaut Crew:

- Dorothy Metcalf-Lindenburger, Commander
- Kimiya Yui
- Timothy Peake
- Steve Squyres

Aquarius Reef Base support crew:

- James Talacek
- Justin Brown

DeepWorker 2000 submersible crew:

- Stanley G. Love
- Steve Giddings
- Serena M. Auñón
- Bill Todd
- Michael L. Gernhardt
- Andrew Abercromby
- Steve Chappell

=== SEATEST II: September 9–13, 2013 ===
Space Environment Analog for Testing EVA Systems and Training ( NEEMO 17 ) Designation skipped

NASA Aquanaut Crew:

- Joseph M. Acaba, Commander
- Kate Rubins
- Andreas Mogensen
- Soichi Noguchi

Aquarius Reef Base support crew:

- Mark Hulsbeck
- Otto Rutten

=== NEEMO 18: July 21–29, 2014 ===
NASA Aquanaut Crew:

- Akihiko Hoshide, Commander
- Jeanette J. Epps
- Mark T. Vande Hei
- Thomas Pesquet

Professional habitat technicians, Aquarius Reef Base support crew:

- James Talacek
- Hank Stark (FIU)

=== NEEMO 19: September 7–13, 2014 ===
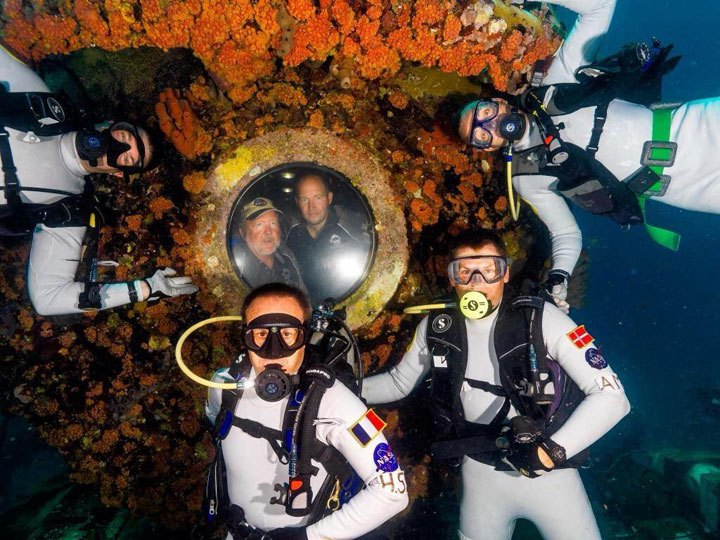
The NEEMO 19 crew: Left to right: Hansen, Stevenin, Mogensen, Bresnik; inside habitat: Hulsbeck, LaPete.

NASA Aquanaut Crew:

- Randolph Bresnik, commander
- Andreas Mogensen, ESA
- Jeremy Hansen, CSA
- Hervé Stevenin, European Astronaut Centre EVA Training Unit

Aquarius Reef Base support crew:

- Mark Hulsbeck
- Ryan LaPete

=== NEEMO 20: July 20 – August 2, 2015 ===
NASA Aquanaut Crew:

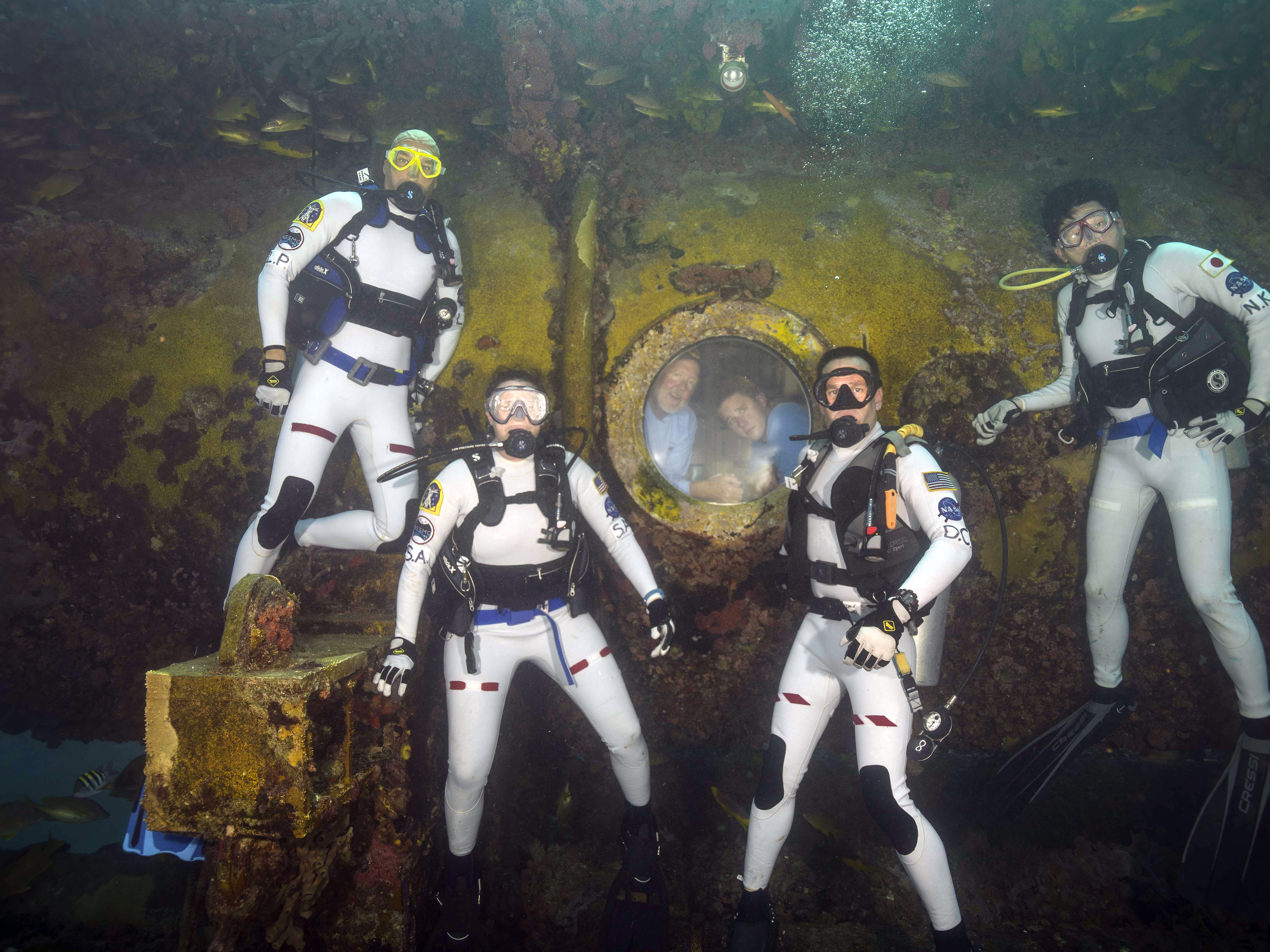

- Luca Parmitano, ESA, commander
- Serena M. Auñón, NASA
- David Coan, NASA EVA Management Office engineer
- Norishige Kanai, JAXA

Professional habitat technicians, Aquarius Reef Base support crew:

- Mark Hulsbeck (FIU)
- Sean Moore (FIU)

NEEMO 20 mission objective was to simulate the time delays associated with sending and receiving commands between controllers on Earth and astronauts on Mars. Additional EVAs will simulate working on the surface of an asteroid, and the use of the DeepWorker submersible as an underwater stand-in for the Multi-Mission Space Exploration Vehicle.

=== NEEMO 21: July 21 – August 5, 2016 ===
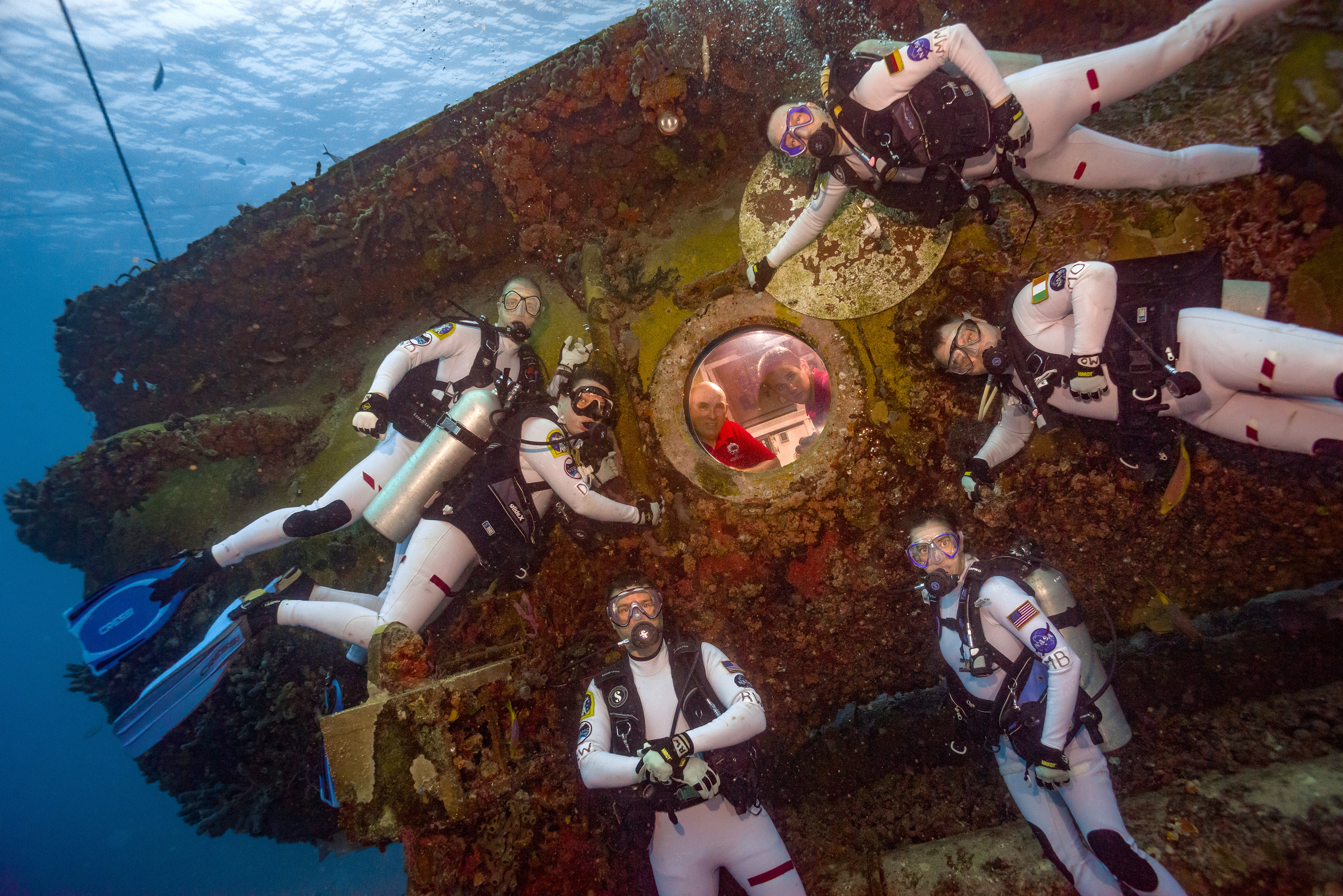
NEEMO 21 crew members outside the Aquarius base

The NEEMO 21 mission was scheduled to begin July 18, 2016 and conclude August 3, 2016; however, the mission start was shifted to July 21, 2016 as a result of unfavorable weather conditions.

NASA Aquanaut Crew:

- Reid Wiseman, NASA, Commander 1
- Megan McArthur, NASA, Commander 2
- Marc O´Gríofa
- Matthias Maurer, ESA
- Noel Du Toit
- Dawn Kernagis

Professional habitat technicians, Aquarius Reef Base support crew:

- Hank Stark (FIU)
- Sean Moore (FIU)

=== NEEMO 22: June 18–27, 2017 ===
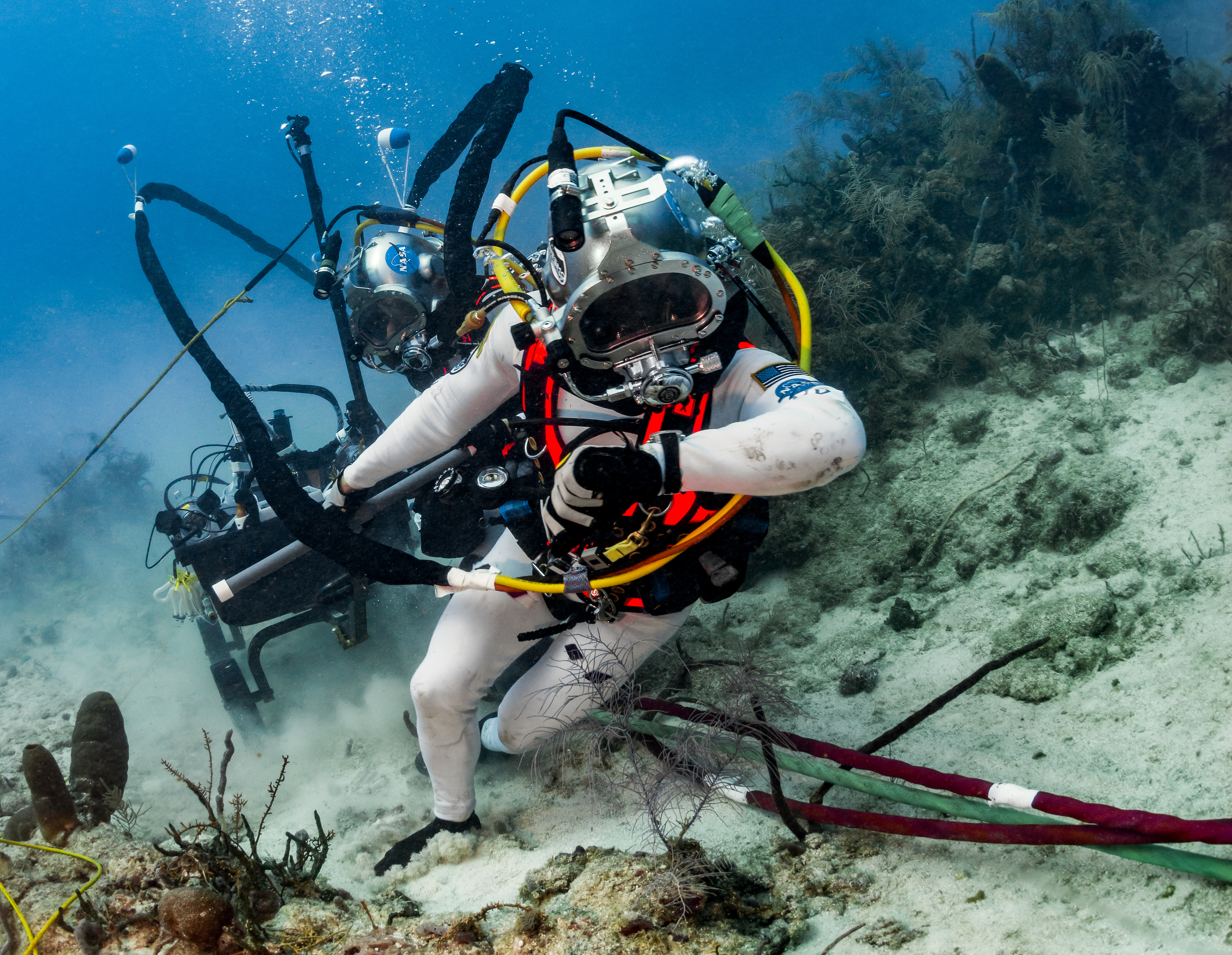
NEEMO 22 Trevor Graff and Dominic D'Agostino during their waterwalk

NASA Aquanaut Crew:

- Kjell Lindgren, NASA, Commander
- Pedro Duque, ESA
- Trevor Graff, NASA/Jacobs
- Dominic D'Agostino, USF

Professional habitat technicians, Aquarius Reef Base support crew:

- Mark Hulsbeck (FIU)
- Sean Moore (FIU)

=== NEEMO 23: June 10–22, 2019 ===
NASA all-female Aquanaut Crew:

- Samantha Cristoforetti, ESA, Commander
- Jessica Watkins, NASA astronaut candidate
- Csilla Ari D’Agostino, a neurobiologist at the University of South Florida
- Shirley Pomponi, Marine biologist at Harbor Branch Oceanographic Institute of Florida Atlantic University

Professional habitat technicians, Aquarius Reef Base support crew:

- Mark Hulsbeck (FIU)
- Tom Horn (FIU)

== See also ==
- Continental Shelf Station Two – Undersea research habitat in the Red Sea
- SEALAB – Experimental underwater habitats developed by the United States Navy
