= Mark Hulsbeck =

American professional aquanaut

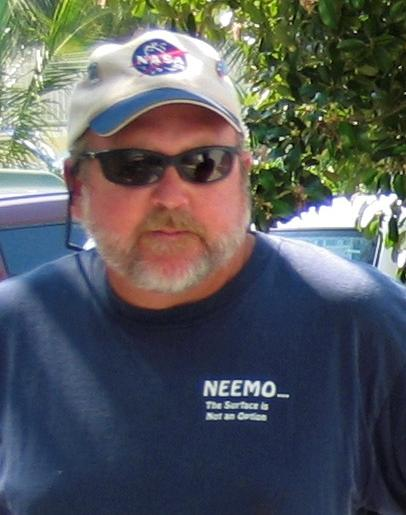
- Mark Hulsbeck in 2007
- Born: Mark Whitney Hulsbeck; February 20, 1956 (age 70); Cincinnati, Ohio
- Education: University of South Florida
- Occupation: Professional aquanaut

Mark Whitney Hulsbeck (born February 20, 1956) is an American professional aquanaut. He serves as an Oceanographic Operations Field Manager and research diver for the Aquarius Reef Base, the world's only undersea research laboratory, operated by Florida International University. Hulsbeck is nicknamed "Otter".

== Early life and career ==
Hulsbeck was born in Cincinnati, Ohio, and grew up in Venice and Orlando, Florida. He served in the United States Navy for five years as a helicopter rescue aircrewman. He subsequently earned a degree in geology from the University of South Florida. Hulsbeck then joined the National Oceanic and Atmospheric Administration Commissioned Corps, in which he served as Navigation Officer on the NOAA ship Malcolm Baldrige during its circumnavigation of the Earth. Hulsbeck's professional qualifications include a United States Coast Guard Captain's license. He is also a Professional Association of Diving Instructors Master Scuba Diver Trainer, an International Association of Nitrox and Technical Divers Nitrox Instructor, a Divers Alert Network Oxygen Instructor and a Dive Medical Technician.

== Aquarius and NEEMO ==
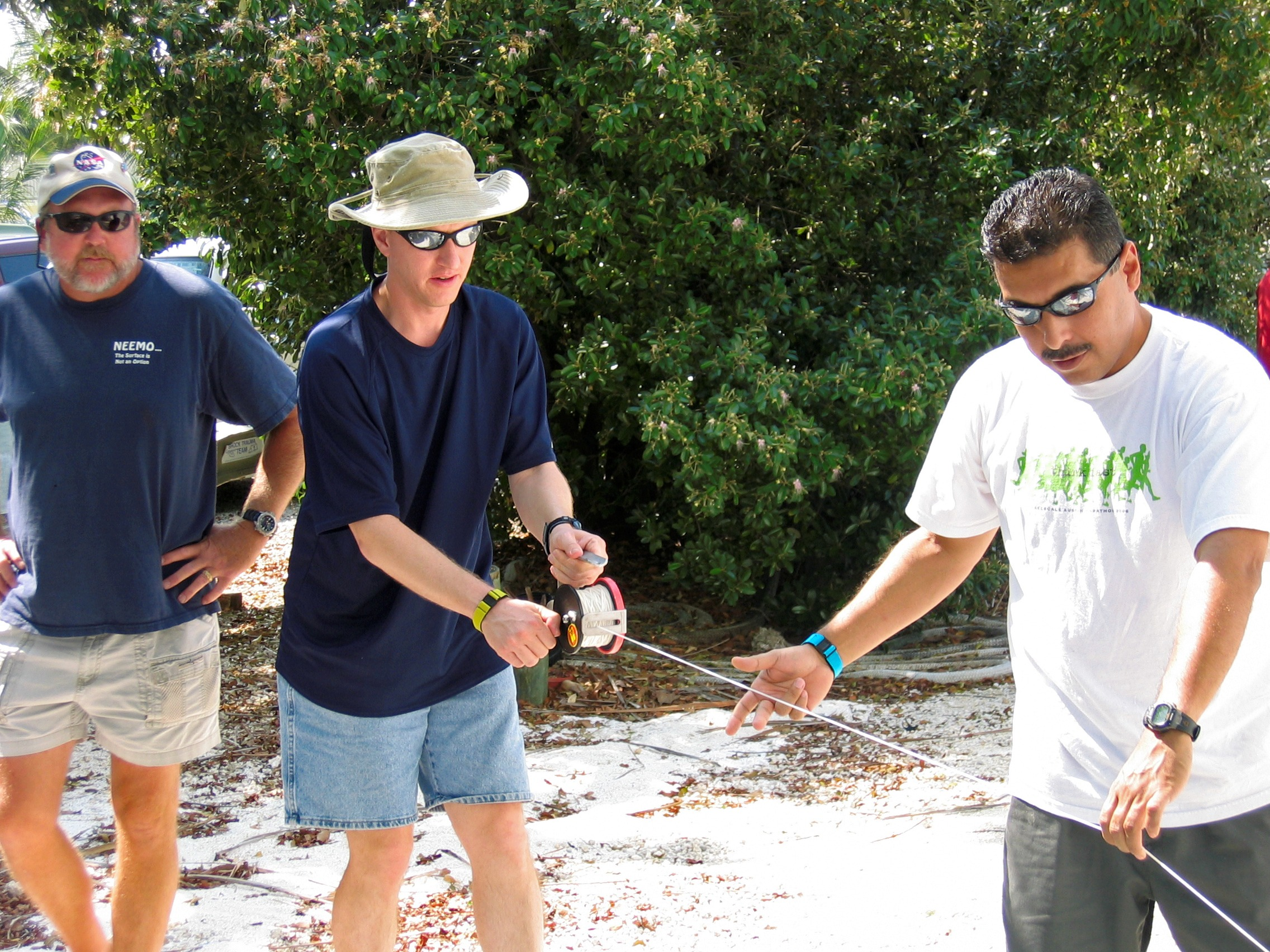
Hulsbeck (left) assists NEEMO 12 aquanauts Josef Schmid and José M. Hernández during training.

In October 2001, Hulsbeck took part as a habitat technician in the NASA Extreme Environment Mission Operations 1 mission (NEEMO 1), the first of a series of NASA-NOAA missions which use Aquarius as an analog environment for space exploration. The NEEMO 1 crew lived and worked underwater aboard Aquarius for seven days. In July 2006, Hulsbeck served as a habitat technician during the NEEMO 10 mission, the crew of which also lived underwater for seven days. Hulsbeck's other missions aboard Aquarius have included a June 2004 coral reef study led by Dr. James Leichter of the Scripps Institution of Oceanography and an October 2007 mission studying the role of sponges in coastal nitrogen cycles. Hulsbeck had taken part in nineteen Aquarius missions as of July 2011. In June and July 2014, Hulsbeck served as lead habitat technician aboard Aquarius during Fabien Cousteau's Mission 31 expedition, living and working underwater for 31 days.

In May 2007, Hulsbeck and other NURP/UNCW divers, including fellow Aquarius divers James Talacek and Jim Buckley, set up a coral monitoring station pylon offshore from the Discovery Bay Marine Laboratory in Discovery Bay, Jamaica, for a cooperative program among Caribbean countries called Mainstreaming Adaptation to Climate Change (MACC). The station was part of NOAA's Integrated Coral Observing Network (ICON). The station was subsequently destroyed during Hurricane Paloma in November 2008.

== Personal life ==
Hulsbeck enjoys reading, diving and boating. He is married with three children and a son from a previous marriage.

== Publications ==
- Bohnsack, James A.; Sutherland, David L.; Harper, Douglas E.; McClellan, David B.; Hulsbeck, Mark W.; Holt, Christopher M. (1989). "The Effects of Fish Trap Mesh Size on Reef Fish Catch Off Southwestern Florida" (PDF). Marine Fisheries Review. 51 (2): 36–46.
- Sutherland, David L.; Bohnsack, James A.; Harper, Douglas E.; Holt, Christopher M.; Hulsbeck, Mark W.; McClellan, David B. (1991). "Preliminary Report, Reef Fish Size and Species Selectivity by Wire Fish Traps in South Florida Waters" (PDF). Proceedings of the 40th Gulf and Caribbean Fisheries Institute: 108–125.
