= Craig B. Cooper =

American aquanaut

Craig Cooper
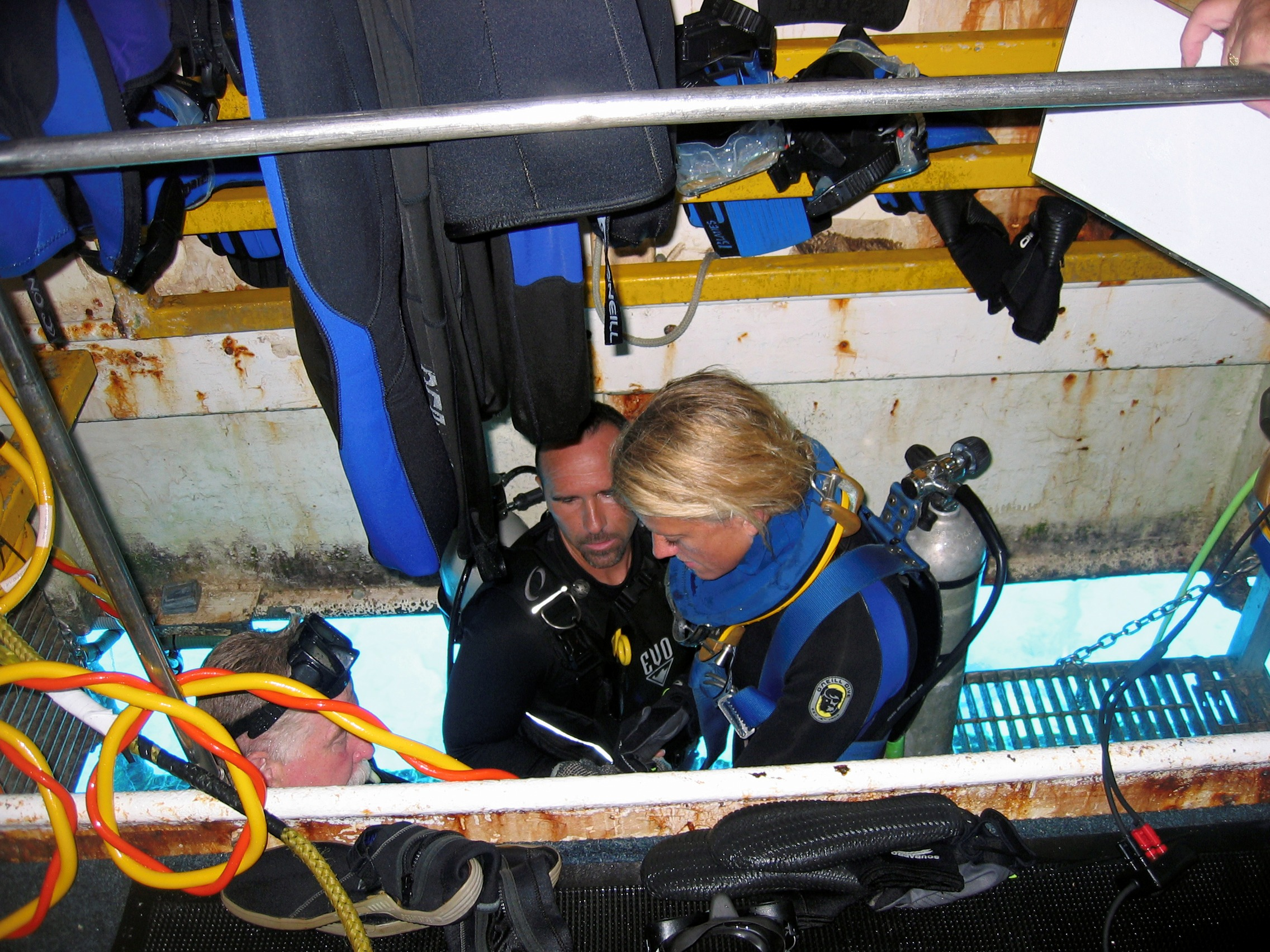
- Right to left: Karen L. Nyberg, Roger Garcia, and Craig B. Cooper, preparing for a NEEMO mission at Key Largo, 2006.
- Born: September 8, 1949 (age 76)
- Education: B.S., Biology, Virginia Polytechnic Institute and State University
- Occupations: Commercial diver, aquanaut

Craig B. Cooper (born September 8, 1949) is a professional aquanaut from the United States who served from 1991 to 2010 as Operations Manager for the Aquarius Reef Base underwater habitat. Cooper is known to fellow divers by the nickname "Coop".

== Education and professional diving career ==
Cooper began scuba diving for recreation in 1964. He graduated from Virginia Tech in 1971 with a Bachelor of Science degree in Biology. During and after college he conducted fisheries research with the Virginia Cooperative Fishery Unit, New Jersey Fish and Game and the U.S. Bureau of Sport Fisheries and Wildlife.

In 1973 Cooper graduated from the Ocean Corporation, a commercial diving school. He then worked for Taylor Diving & Salvage for eleven years as a commercial diver in many different parts of the world. His work included air, mixed gas, and saturation diving. He also gained experience with welding habitats. Cooper was diving near the Ixtoc oil platform when it exploded in 1979, killing a friend of his. Cooper subsequently worked with oil well firefighter Red Adair during the efforts to contain the Ixtoc I oil spill.

In 1984 Cooper joined the North Carolina Department of Transportation as an underwater bridge inspector. This work soon evolved to include underwater bridge construction of concrete piles and foundations. The University of North Carolina Wilmington contacted Cooper in December 1990 after acquiring the Aquarius underwater laboratory. In January 1991 Cooper began managing the refurbishment of Aquarius in drydock prior to its deployment at its present site in the Florida Keys in 1993.

== Aquarius ==
As Operations Manager at Aquarius for the National Undersea Research Center (NURC), Cooper supervised the daily activities of the underwater habitat. He also served as Coast Guard-licensed Captain, Diving Medical Technician, and habitat technician during missions aboard Aquarius. Cooper commented of the scientists participating in a June 1995 marine biology mission aboard Aquarius, "In many ways this is like a space mission... We need to keep a close eye on them to make sure everything's okay."

During Hurricane Gordon in 1994, Cooper helped rescue a crew of scientists and divers who had to evacuate Aquarius and climb up a rescue line to the surface in 15-foot seas after one of the habitat's generators caught fire. As of 2008, no scientists or staff members had been injured at Aquarius due to storms.

In July 2004, Cooper took part as a habitat technician in the NASA Extreme Environment Mission Operations 6 (NEEMO 6) mission, one of a series of NASA-NOAA missions which use Aquarius as an analog environment for space exploration. The NEEMO 6 crew lived and worked underwater aboard Aquarius for ten days. In April 2005, Cooper served as a habitat technician during the NEEMO 8 mission, the crew of which lived underwater for three days.

Other missions aboard Aquarius in which Cooper has participated include a June 2006 mission with the U.S. Navy Specialized Research Diving Detachment (SRDD) during which NURC divers investigated the possibility of using rebreathers during excursions from Aquarius. During the investigation of the death of Aquarius aquanaut Dewey Smith in 2009, the panel of outside experts asked Cooper to organize a test in which the hydraulic hammer in use near Smith at the time of his fatal accident was again used underwater in the vicinity of an Inspiration closed circuit rebreather (CCR) similar to the one Smith had been using.

Cooper is a friend of SEALAB aquanaut Bob Barth, whom he regards as a mentor. In 2003, Cooper, Barth, U.S. Navy Supervisor of Diving Captain Mark Helmkamp and NOAA Captain Craig McLean organized a partnership allowing Navy divers to take part in Aquarius saturation diving missions. In a blog entry written in 1999, Cooper wrote of his fellow Aquarius topside personnel and habitat technicians, "If the scientists are the astronauts, these guys are the junior Bob Barths."

After leaving the Operations Manager position in 2009, Cooper continued serving with Aquarius in his capacities as diver, medical technician and habitat technician, as well as working on program development and collaborations with other agencies. In March 2010, Cooper retired as Operations Director of Aquarius. At Cooper's retirement ceremony, Barth commented, "You're the only one, don't be the last!" Cooper subsequently joined the team of retired University of Connecticut professor Richard A. Cooper, who hopes to build an undersea lab called SeaBase 1 in the Belize Barrier Reef.

== Personal life ==
Cooper has raised Arabian show horses and Friesian draft horses with his wife, Kathleen, at their farm in Wake Forest, North Carolina.

== Publications ==
- Shepard, Andrew N.; Dinsmore, David A.; Miller, Steven L.; Cooper, Craig B.; Wicklund, Robert I. (1996). Lang, MA; Baldwin, CC (eds.). "Aquarius Undersea Laboratory: The Next Generation". The Diving for Science…1996, "Methods and Techniques of Underwater Research". Proceedings of the American Academy of Underwater Sciences (Sixteenth Annual Scientific Diving Symposium): 205–212. Archived from the original on March 6, 2010.
- Cooper, Craig B. (February 23–24, 2006). Lang, Michael A.; Smith, N. Eugene (eds.). "Underwater Habitats at 300 FSW: A Thing of the Past, Or Still Viable Today?" (PDF). Proceedings of Advanced Scientific Diving Workshop. Smithsonian Institution: 166–170.
- Miller, Steven L.; Cooper, Craig B. (Winter 2000–2001). "The Aquarius Underwater Laboratory: America's "Inner Space" Station". Marine Technology Society Journal. 34 (4): 69–74. doi:10.4031/mtsj.34.4.9.
