= Carcinogenesis (journal) =

- Discipline: Oncology
- Language: English
- Edited by: Sharon R. Pine

Publication details
- History: 1980–present
- Publisher: Oxford University Press
- Frequency: Monthly
- Open access: Hybrid
- Impact factor: 4.944 (2020)

Standard abbreviations
- ISO 4: Carcinogenesis

Indexing
- CODEN: CRNGDP
- ISSN: 0143-3334 (print); 1460-2180 (web)
- OCLC no.: 06123551

Links
- Journal homepage; Online access; Online Archive

Carcinogenesis is a peer-reviewed medical journal in the field of cancer biology. It was established in 1980 and is published monthly by Oxford University Press. As of 2024, the editor-in-chief is Sharon R. Pine (University of Colorado School of Medicine, Aurora, CO, USA). Carcinogenesis publishes articles in four sections: cancer biology covers the cell and molecular biology of cancer, as well as mutation and DNA repair; molecular epidemiology includes genetic predisposition to cancer; cancer prevention covers chemoprophylaxis as well as dietary factors; and carcinogenesis covers all forms of carcinogens, including their metabolism and detection in the environment. Authors can pay to have their articles released freely online as part of a hybrid open access scheme. Free or reduced-rate online access is available to educational institutions in low-income countries.

== History ==
The journal was established in 1980 by R. Colin Garner (University of York) and Anthony Dipple (National Cancer Institute). The original scope of Carcinogenesis was defined in the first issue as research relating to "the prevention of cancer in man", and the journal was conceived from the outset as a multidisciplinary journal, with the intention of encouraging the "cross-fertilization of ideas" across the "very broad spectrum of scientific endeavour" of cancer research. In 2008, the journal added the subtitle "Integrative Cancer Research" to reflect its multidisciplinary scope.

The journal was originally published by IRL Press, which merged with Oxford University Press in 1989.

== Abstracting and indexing ==
Carcinogenesis is abstracted and indexed in Biological Abstracts, BIOSIS Previews, CAB Abstracts, Chemical Abstracts, Current Contents/Life Sciences, BIOBASE – Current Awareness in Biological Sciences, EMBASE, Excerpta Medica, Global Health, MEDLINE, ProQuest, and the Science Citation Index. According to the Journal Citation Reports, the journal has a 2020 impact factor of 4.944.
