= Dominic Landucci =

American professional aquanaut and Network Analyst at the NOAA Aquarius Reef Base

- Dominic Landucci
- Born: St. Paul, Minnesota
- Education: Dominic's Website
- Occupation: Aquanaut

Dominic Landucci is an American professional aquanaut with the University of North Carolina Wilmington (UNCW). He served as the Network Analyst at the National Oceanic and Atmospheric Administration's Aquarius Reef Base, the world's only undersea research laboratory.

== Early life and army career ==
Landucci was born in St. Paul, Minnesota, and grew up in Albany, Oregon, graduating from high school in 1986. He subsequently enlisted in the United States Army, where he specialized in communications. Landucci underwent basic training at Fort Jackson, South Carolina. He later served at Fort Gordon, Georgia and with the 3rd Infantry Division in Kitzingen, Germany. Landucci joined NOAA's National Undersea Research Center (NURC) in 1993.

== Aquarius ==
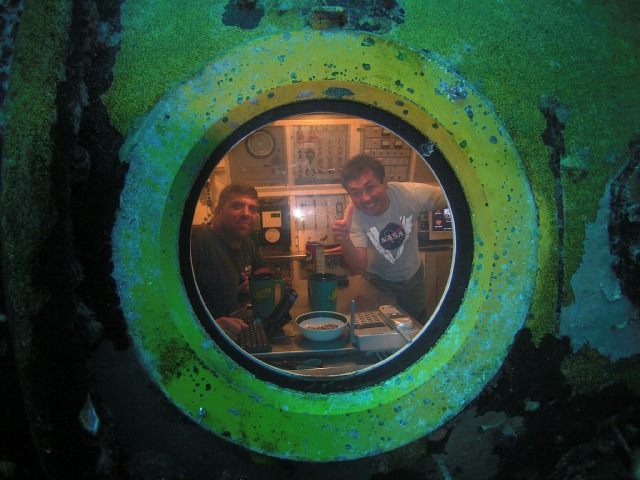
Landucci (left) and NEEMO 10 commander Koichi Wakata seen through the main portal of Aquarius.

Landucci serves as the Network Analyst and Network Administrator at Aquarius Reef Base for NURC. As the person in charge of Aquarius' computer network, Landucci has introduced improvements in broadband access for researchers aboard Aquarius. To that end, Landucci assisted in the attachment of Orthogon Systems antennas onto an offshore buoy in heavy seas. Landucci commented, "We now have a better learning environment. Without the hassle of inadequate technology to deal with, the scientists conducting experiments within Aquarius, as well as the receivers of data at the land-based office, can focus all their efforts on their mission and the important data being gathered." He instituted a "hoot and holler" voice system linking the habitat and the onshore Watch Desk, where safety instruments are monitored during Aquarius missions.

In 2006, when Aquarius received the InfoWorld 100 award for innovative use of wireless solutions, Landucci commented, "By using OS-Gemini, we overcame tremendous challenges, such as rough seas, great distances and unpredictable weather, to deploy a reliable connection between our land base and the Aquarius laboratory at the bottom of the ocean." NURC also received a CIO 100 award for information technology innovation in 2006. Landucci received a Staff Award of Excellence from UNCW in August 2006. Landucci has used webcams inside and outside Aquarius to transmit live video and audio to classrooms around the United States.

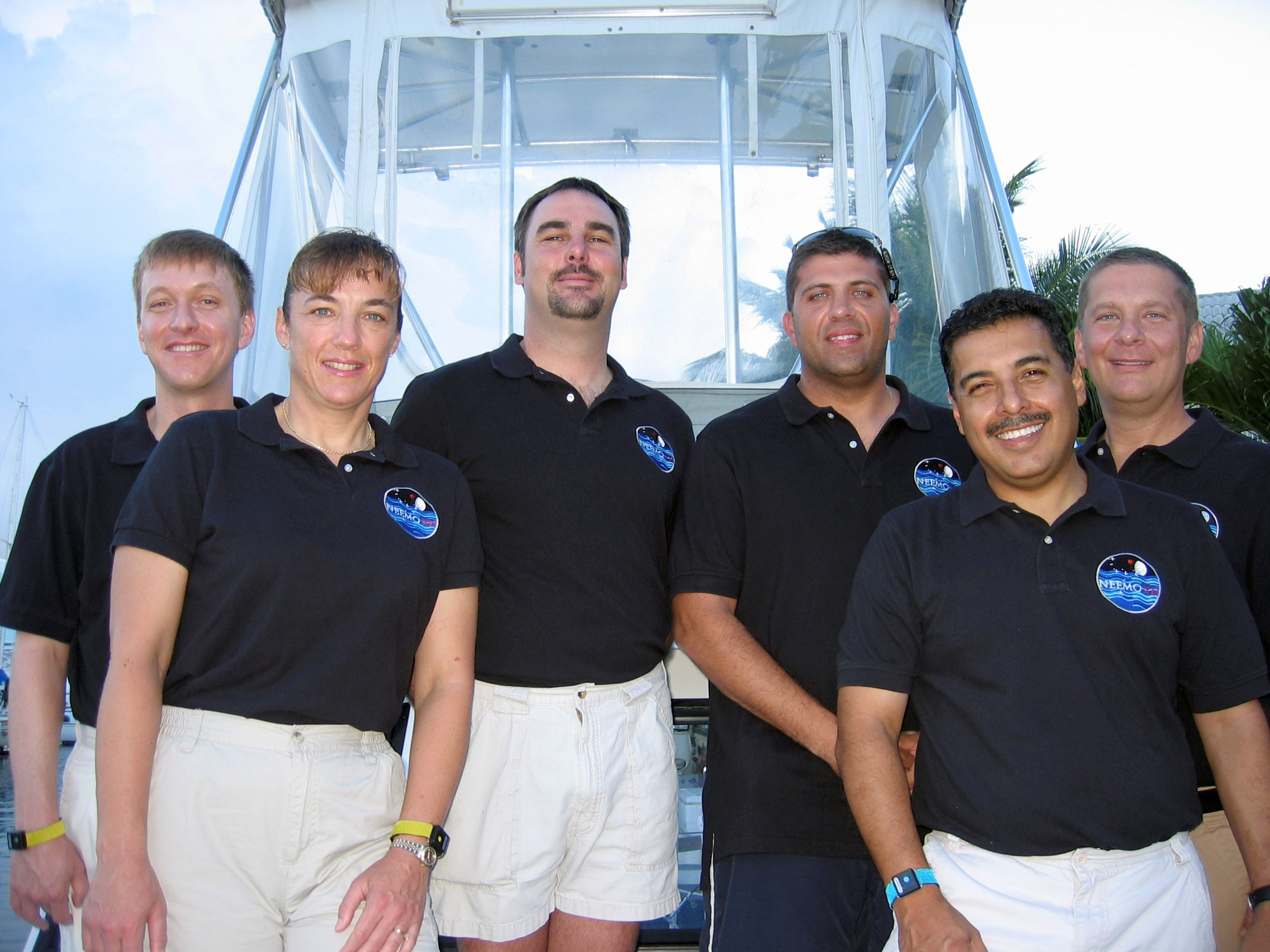
The NEEMO 12 crew. L–R: Josef Schmid, Heidemarie Stefanyshyn-Piper, James Talacek, Landucci, José M. Hernández and Timothy J. Broderick.

Landucci has taken part as a habitat technician in two of the NASA Extreme Environment Mission Operations (NEEMO) missions, a series of NASA-NOAA missions which use Aquarius as an analog environment for space exploration. Landucci served as a habitat technician during the following missions:

- NEEMO 10: July 22–28, 2006
- NEEMO 12: May 7–18, 2007

During the NEEMO 12 mission, Landucci assisted with the computer technology aspects of a telesurgery demonstration for the American Telemedicine Association meeting in Nashville, Tennessee.
