= Bill Todd =

Project Manager for Exploration Analogs at NASA's Johnson Space Center

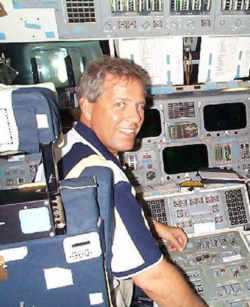
- Bill Todd in the Shuttle Simulator.
- Born: William Laurence Todd; 1958/1959
- Education: Geology, University of Houston
- Employer: Sea and Space Consultant
- Known for: Aquanaut, NEEMO Project Director, Explorer, Public Speaker
- Title: Project Manager for Exploration Analogs

William Laurence Todd is a Project Manager for Exploration Analogs at NASA's Johnson Space Center (JSC) in Houston, Texas. He has also served as a NASA Undersea Research Team Project Lead and Spaceflight Training Simulation Supervisor at NASA JSC. Todd is a veteran Aquanaut of 5 missions. In 2001, he commanded the first NASA Extreme Environment Mission Operations (NEEMO) mission, a joint NASA-NOAA program to study human survival in the Aquarius underwater laboratory in preparation for future space exploration.

Todd has also spent many years helping to develop the futuristic undersea exploration vessel SeaOrbiter, which was inspired by French architect Jacques Rougerie.

== Education ==
Todd grew up watching the Apollo launches from his beachfront hometown of Cocoa Beach, Florida, where his father was also employed in the space program. It was there, at a young age, that he was immersed in and captivated by both sea and space environments. Todd graduated from the University of Houston with a degree in geology in 1982. He has worked in several underwater habitats, piloted many submersibles, and has conducted myriad expeditions on the parallels between living and working in outer space and "inner space".

== NASA career ==
Todd works as a subsea and space operations consultant as well as for Booz Allen at the Johnson Space Center in Houston, Texas, as the NEEMO, NEEMO NXT and SEATEST Project Manager. As a Simulation Supervisor in Spaceflight Training, Todd was responsible for developing and executing multi-national simulations used for training astronauts and flight control teams. He has also worked as an Operations Lead at the Mission Control Center in Moscow, Russia.

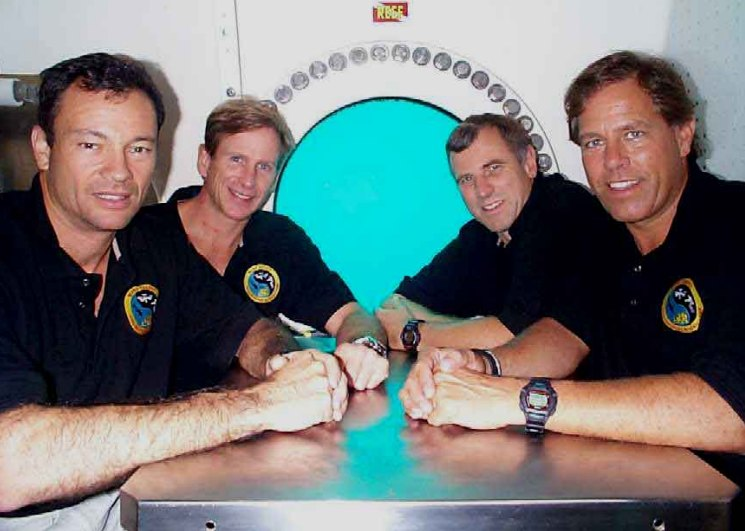
The first NEEMO crew, L-R: in front, Michael Lopez-Alegria and Todd, in back, Michael Gernhardt and Dave Williams.

In 2000, Todd developed the NASA Undersea Research Team "NEEMO" (NASA Extreme Environment Mission Operations). This program utilizes the Aquarius laboratory as a research facility for space missions such as long-term space habitation. Todd served as an aquanaut on the 2000 "NASA SEATEST" mission, NASA SEATEST 3 in 2016, SEATEST 4 in 2017, and as the commander of the October 2001 NASA NEEMO 1 mission. He subsequently managed the "topside" teams for NASA missions, and was the Mission Director for NEEMO 7, NEEMO 8 and NEEMO 14. As of 2016, Todd remains the project manager for NEEMO thru NEEMO 21. In June 2012, Todd piloted a DeepWorker 2000 submersible as part of the NEEMO 16 mission.

Todd was involved in the training for many spaceflights, including the first two flights to build the International Space Station, crew training for the deployment mission of the Italian-made Tethered Satellite System and for the first flight to rendezvous with the Mir Space Station. Earlier in his career, Todd worked as a Space Shuttle systems astronaut instructor for many missions including STS-31, the flight which deployed the Hubble Space Telescope. Todd also led the international training activities for STS-97/ISS 4A, which flew in November 2000.

== Personal ==
Todd's wife, Karen, and their two daughters, Kristen and Kari, reside in Nassau Bay, Texas and Beaver Creek, Colorado. Todd is a Professional Association of Diving Instructors (PADI) Divemaster who has made over 2000 dives. He is also a submersible pilot, an instrument-rated pilot, seaplane pilot and Explorers Club Fellow. Todd is a member of the SeaSpace Symposium and of the advisory board for the International Association for Handicapped Divers. Todd also plays guitar in his rock band, The Rockit Scientists.

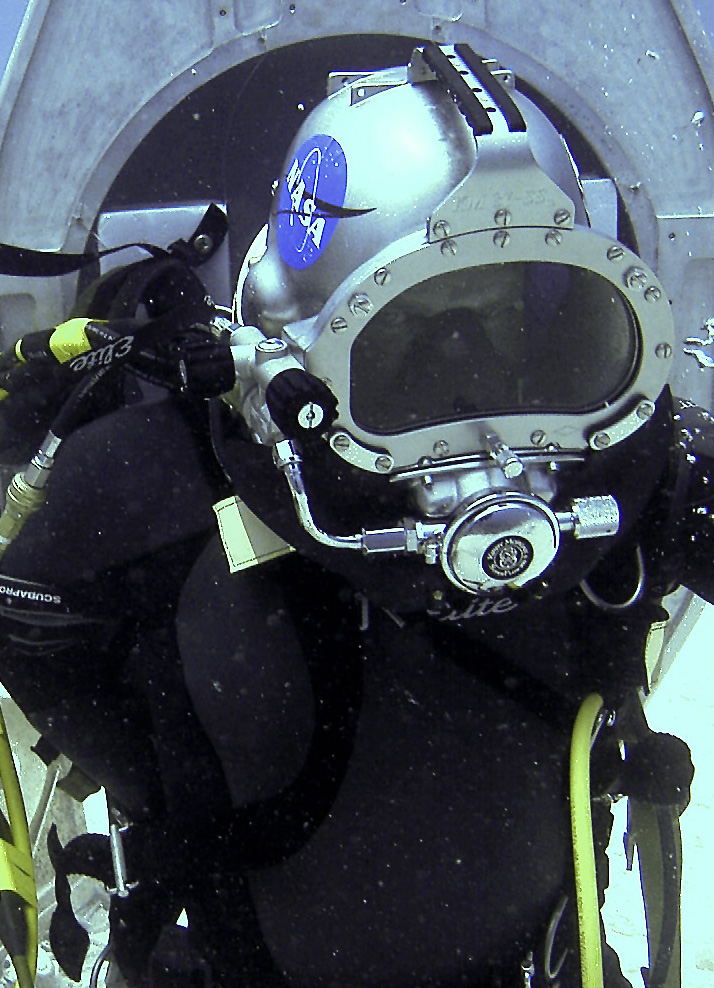
Bill Todd diving the Superlite 37 dive hat during NEEMO 16 mission operations in 2012
