= Michael McKay (astronaut) =

Canadian astronaut candidate

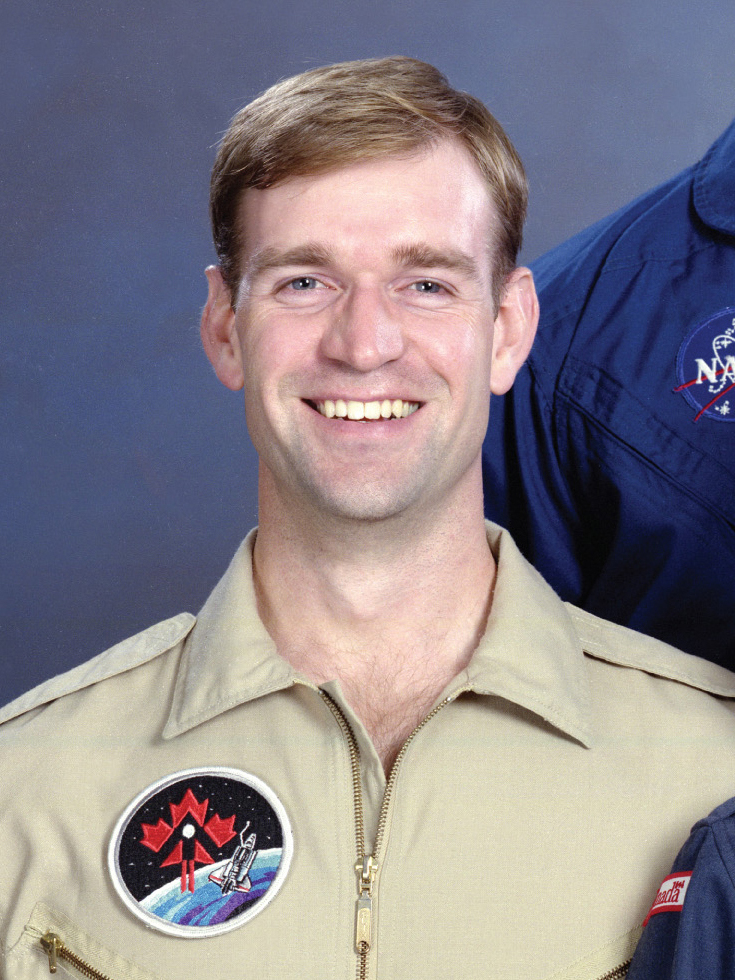
- McKay in 1992
- Space career

NRC/CSA astronaut
- Status: Retired
- Selection: 1992 CSA Group
- Missions: None

Michael J. McKay is a Canadian astronaut candidate. He was selected in the initial round of four Canadian astronauts in 1992, along with Chris Hadfield, Julie Payette, and Dafydd Williams. He worked as an engineer payload specialist on the ground before resigning from the Astronaut Corps in 1995 without ever flying into space.

== Astronaut career ==
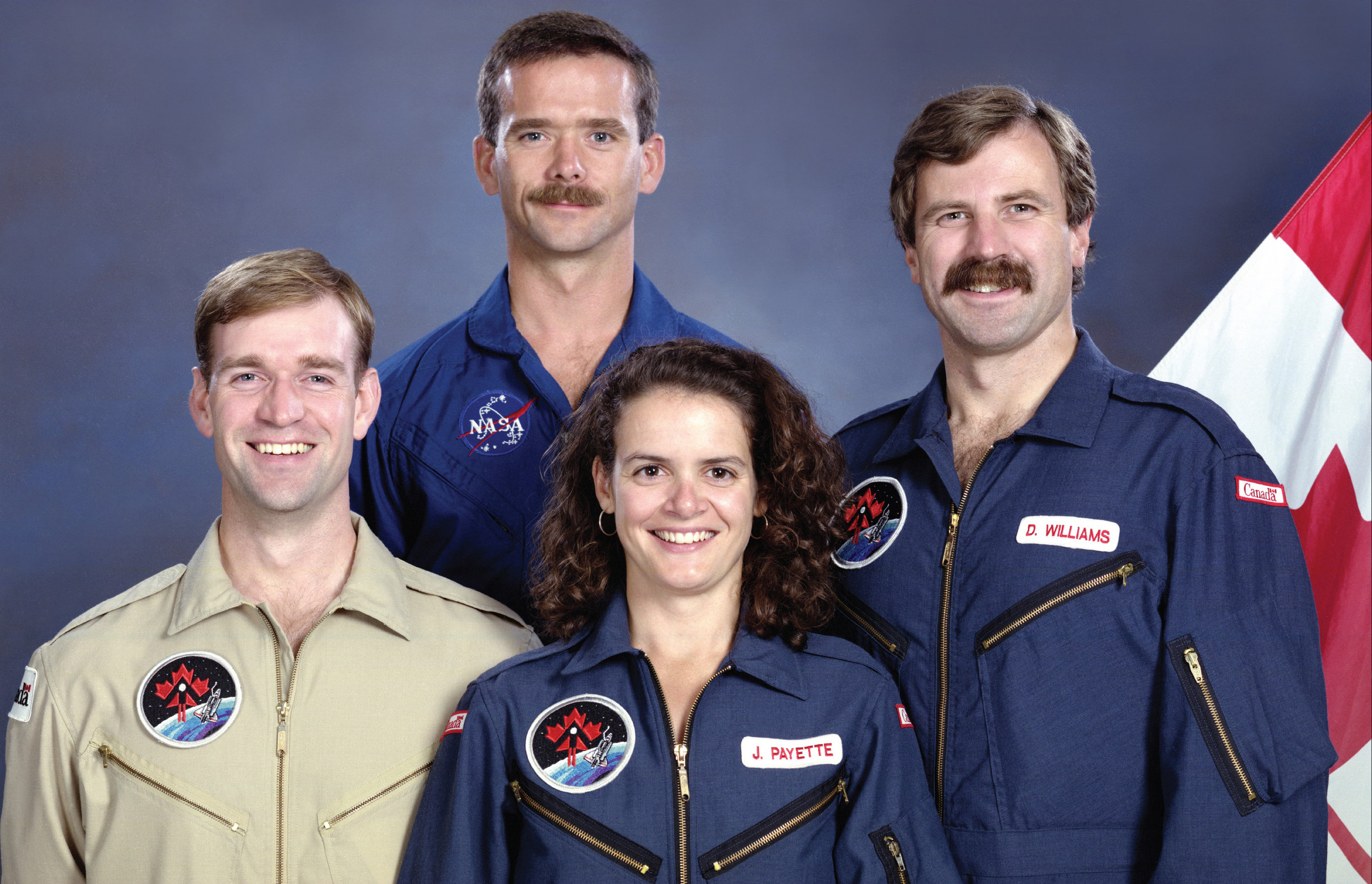
McKay (left) with other Canadian astronauts selected in 1992

As one of over 5,300 applicants, and a then-Canadian Armed Forces Aeronautical Engineer with the rank of captain, he was selected in 1992 for Space Team Canada of the Canadian Space Agency (CSA). McKay was selected as an alternate after Robert Stewart left the Canadian Space Agency program to accept a position at the University of Calgary.

McKay worked on the Advanced Space Vision System and the robotic arms for the International Space Station, nicknamed Canadarm. The first Space Shuttle mission to include his work was the Space Vision System support to the Wake Shield Facility, a free flying payload that was released from Space Shuttle Discovery on STS-60. Shortly thereafter, in February 1994, McKay was one of four astronauts who participated in the Canadian Astronaut Program Space Unit Life Simulation (CAPSULS), a 7-day simulated space mission which was preceded by several weeks of intensive training.

In early 1995, McKay resigned from the Astronaut Corps for medical reasons, but remained in the employment of CAP as an engineer and was actively involved in mission support activities. He was appointed Project Manager for the Canadian Space Vision System and was the Mission Manager for the STS-85 mission, also Shuttle Discovery. Fellow Canadian Bjarni Tryggvason flew on STS-85 as a Payload Specialist.

In October 1997, McKay left CSA to return to active military service.

== Military career ==
McKay joined the Canadian Armed Forces in 1981 and attended Royal Military College in Kingston. He graduated in 1985 with a four-year Bachelor of Science degree. From 1986 to 1987, he worked as a Software Support Officer with Aircraft Maintenance and Engineering at CFB Cold Lake, Alberta. In 1987, McKay was named Mechanical Support Officer in command of 145 people and was later appointed to the position of Canadair CF-5 Repair Officer, responsible for the periodic inspection of the Canadair CF-5 fleet, a position which he held until 1991. After completing his postgraduate degree in 1991, also from Royal Military College, McKay was a lecturer with the College Militaire de Saint-Jean.

In October 1997, McKay left the Canadian Space Agency to return to active military service with the Directorate of Space Development within the National Defence Headquarters in Ottawa. There, he was responsible for the human resource and education development for the Canadian Armed Forces Military Space Program.
