= Betty Ida Roots =

British Canadian zoologist (1927–2020)

- Born: 21 October 1927; Croydon, Surrey, UK
- Died: 24 October 2020 (aged 93)
- Education: University of London
- Scientific career
- Fields: Zoology
- Workplaces: University of Toronto, Canada

Betty Ida Roots (21 October 1927 – 24 October 2020) was a British-born zoologist and neurobiologist based at the University of Toronto in Canada. Her research examined how animals respond to changes in their environment, with particular reference to the nervous system, glial cells, and neuron–glia relationships from a comparative perspective. At Toronto she held several senior academic and administrative roles, helped establish an electron microscope facility at the Mississauga campus, and initiated the university's collaborative PhD program in neuroscience. She was elected a fellow of the Royal Society of Canada and served as president of the Royal Canadian Institute for Science in 1994.

== Career ==
In 1927, Roots was born in South Croydon Surrey, England, in the UK. She completed a Bachelor of Science degree in zoology at the University of London's University College (1949), a Diploma in Education at the Institution of Education (1950). and later, a doctorate in comparative physiology at the University of London (1981). Roots held a number of teaching and visiting scientist positions at a variety of institutions, including the Royal Free Hospital School of Medicine and the University of Illinois' Department of Physiology and Biophysics, before immigrating to Canada and joining the University of Toronto as an Associate Professor of Zoology in 1969.

Roots published over 100 academic papers which have been cited over 2,500 times, and had an h-index and i10-index of 30 and 61 respectively. Her research interests included the responses of animals to environmental change with particular reference to the nervous system, and the structure and function of glial cells and neuron–glia relationships across species. . She supervised various students in her laboratory, including Canadian astronaut Roberta Bondar. While at the University of Toronto, Roots served in a number of administrative roles, including the Associate Dean of Sciences at Erindale College (1976-1980), Chair of the Department of Zoology, and appointed Professor Emeritus in 1993. Roots also created a collaborative PhD program in neuroscience at the University of Toronto. She was an Elected Fellow of the Royal Society of Canada, and served as president of the Royal Canadian Institute for Science in 1994.

Roots died, aged 93, on 24 October 2020.

== Selected bibliography ==
- Paul R Laming, H Kimelberg, S Robinson, A Salm, N Hawrylak, C Müller, B Roots, and K Ng. Neuronal–glial interactions and behaviour. Neuroscience & Biobehavioral Reviews. 2000.
- B Roots. Neurofilament accumulation induced in synapses by leupeptin. Science. 1983.
- Patricia V Johnston and Betty I Roots. Brain lipid fatty acids and temperature acclimation. Comparative Biochemistry and Physiology. 1964.
- B Roots. Phospholipids of goldfish (Carassius auratus L.) brain: the influence of environmental temperature. Comparative Biochemistry and Physiology. 1968.
- B Roots. The water relations of earthworms: II. Resistance to desiccation and immersion, and behaviour when submerged and when allowed a choice of environment. Journal of Experimental Biology. 1956.
