= Jenni Gibbons =

Canadian astronaut (born 1988)

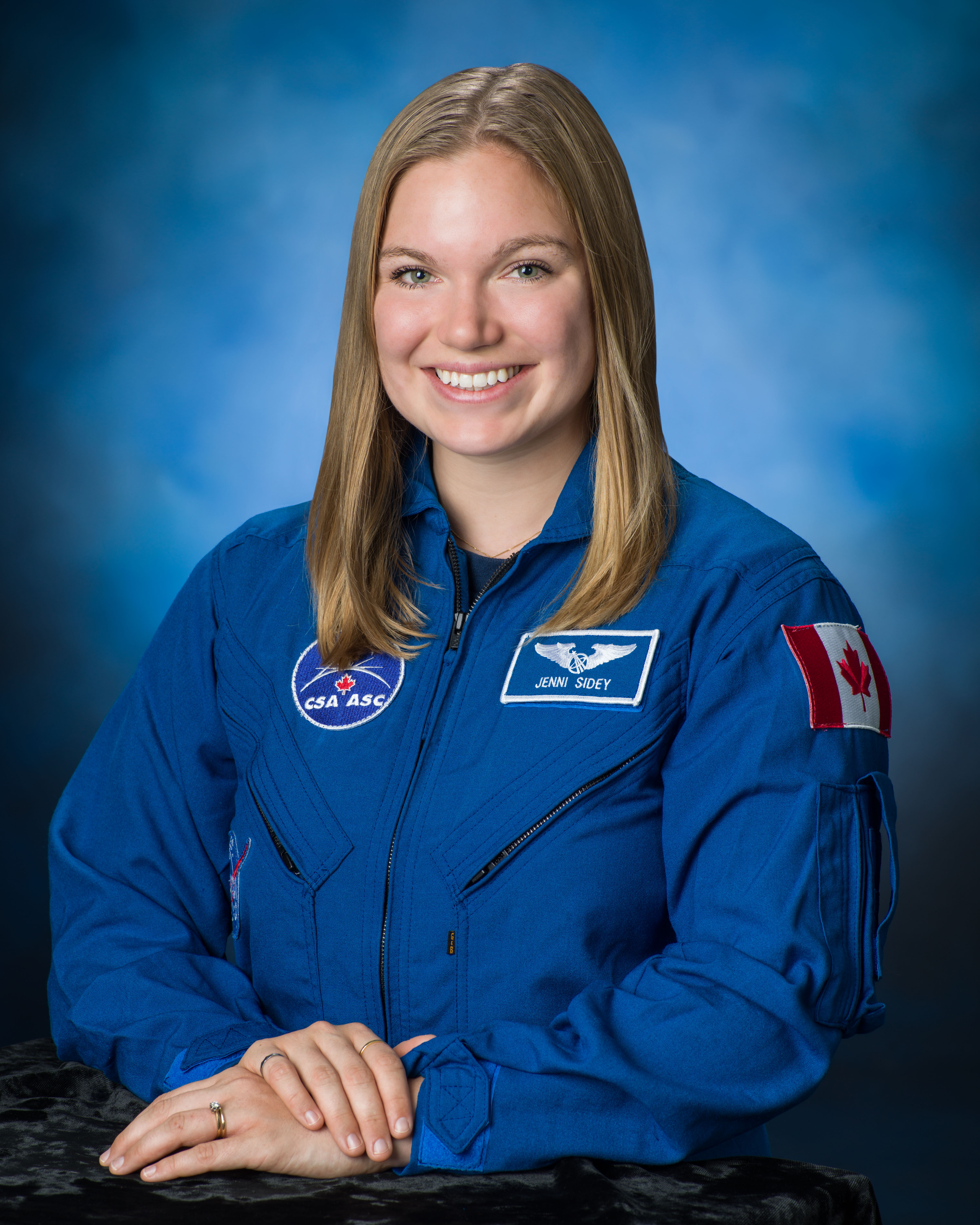
- Gibbons in 2017
- Born: Jennifer Anne MacKinnon Sidey; 3 August 1988 (age 38); Calgary, Alberta, Canada
- Education: McGill University (BEng); Jesus College, Cambridge (PhD)
- Space career

CSA astronaut
- Selection: 2017 CSA Group; NASA Group 22 (2017)

Jennifer Anne MacKinnon Sidey-Gibbons (born 3 August 1988) is a Canadian astronaut, engineer, and academic. She was selected by the Canadian Space Agency (CSA) as one of the two members of the 2017 CSA Group alongside Joshua Kutryk. In 2023, CSA assigned her to be Jeremy Hansen's backup for the Artemis II lunar flyby mission.

== Early life and education ==
Jennifer Anne MacKinnon Sidey was born on 3 August 1988 in Calgary. She earned a Bachelor of Engineering with honours in mechanical engineering from McGill University, where she conducted research in collaboration with the Canadian Space Agency (CSA) and the Flight Research Laboratory of the National Research Council Canada on flame propagation in microgravity.

In 2015, she completed a PhD in engineering at Jesus College, Cambridge. Her doctoral research, supervised by Nondas Mastorakos, focused on combustion processes.

== Academic career ==
Before joining the CSA, Gibbons was a lecturer in internal combustion engines at the Department of Engineering at the University of Cambridge. Her research centred on turbulent flame dynamics and pollutant reduction in combustion systems. She also taught undergraduate and graduate students in the Energy, Fluid Mechanics, and Turbomachinery Division on topics such as energy production, thermodynamics, and flame physics.

== Awards and honours ==
In 2016, Gibbons received the Institution of Engineering and Technology's Young Woman Engineer of the Year Award and a Royal Academy of Engineering Young Engineer of the Year Award.

In 2023, she was selected by The Karman Project for the Karman Fellowship.

== CSA career ==
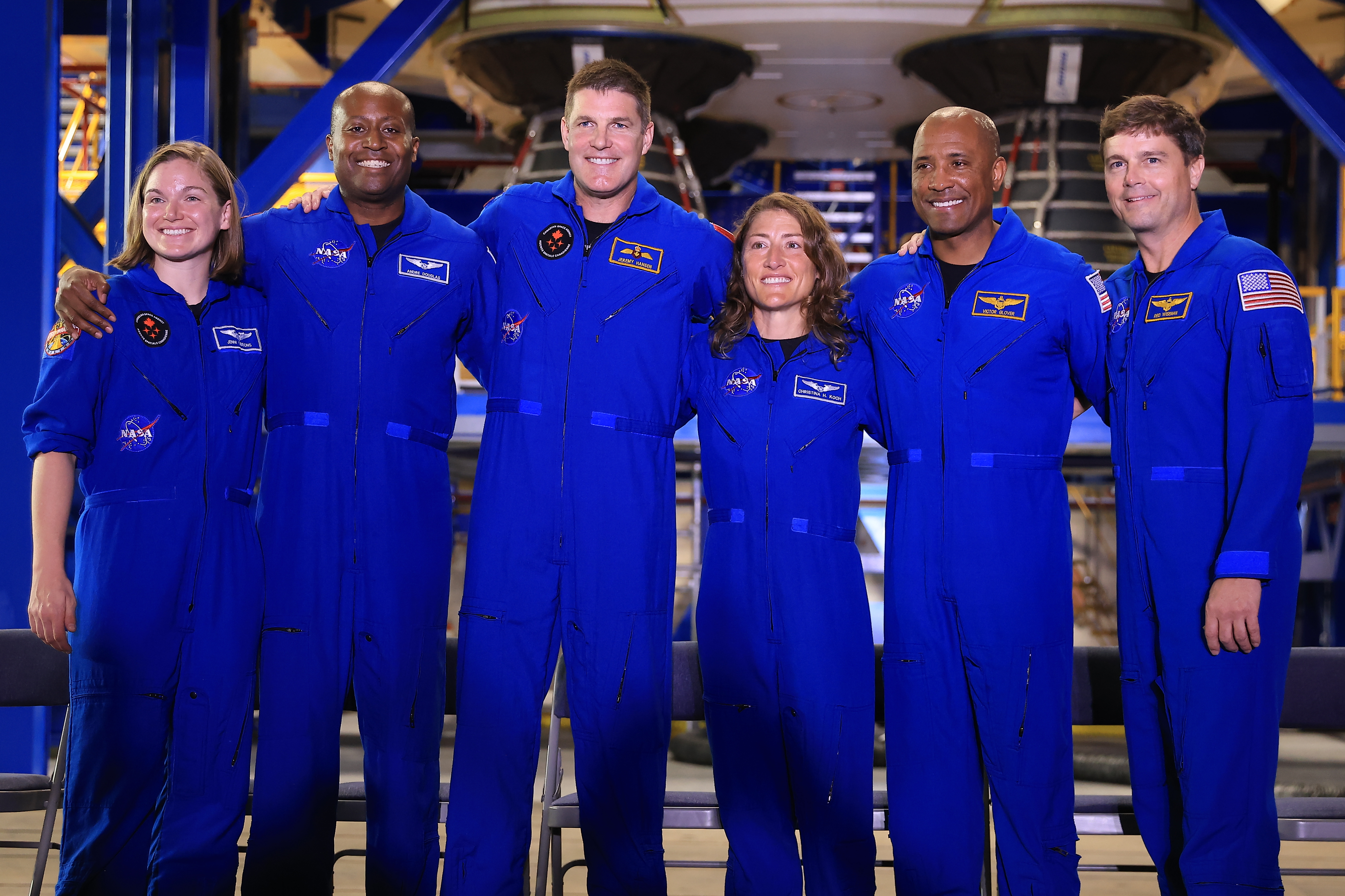
Gibbons (left) with the other backup and prime crewmembers of Artemis II after a news conference in December 2024

Gibbons was selected by the CSA in 2017 as part of its fourth astronaut recruitment campaign, joining Joshua Kutryk in the 2017 CSA Group. She was the third female astronaut candidate chosen by the CSA, following Roberta Bondar and Julie Payette. At 28 years old, she became the youngest astronaut candidate ever selected by the agency.

In July 2017, Gibbons relocated to Houston, to complete the two-year NASA Astronaut Candidate Training Program at the Johnson Space Center, training alongside the 2017 NASA astronaut class. She graduated in 2020.

In 2020, Gibbons was certified as a capsule communicator (CAPCOM). She first served as CAPCOM during Expedition 63 and supported a series of spacewalks in 2021 to upgrade the International Space Station's solar arrays.

On 22 November 2023, she was announced as the backup crew member for Jeremy Hansen on the Artemis II mission. She was also assigned to support launch operations as an astronaut support person responsible for final spacecraft configuration and served as CAPCOM during the mission. Artemis II was a crewed test flight of the Orion spacecraft on the Space Launch System (SLS), that lifted off on 1 April 2026.

Gibbons will serve as lead Capcom for the Artemis III mission, the role that was filled by Stan Love during the Artemis II mission.
