= Heidemarie Stefanyshyn-Piper =

American astronaut and Navy captain (born 1963)

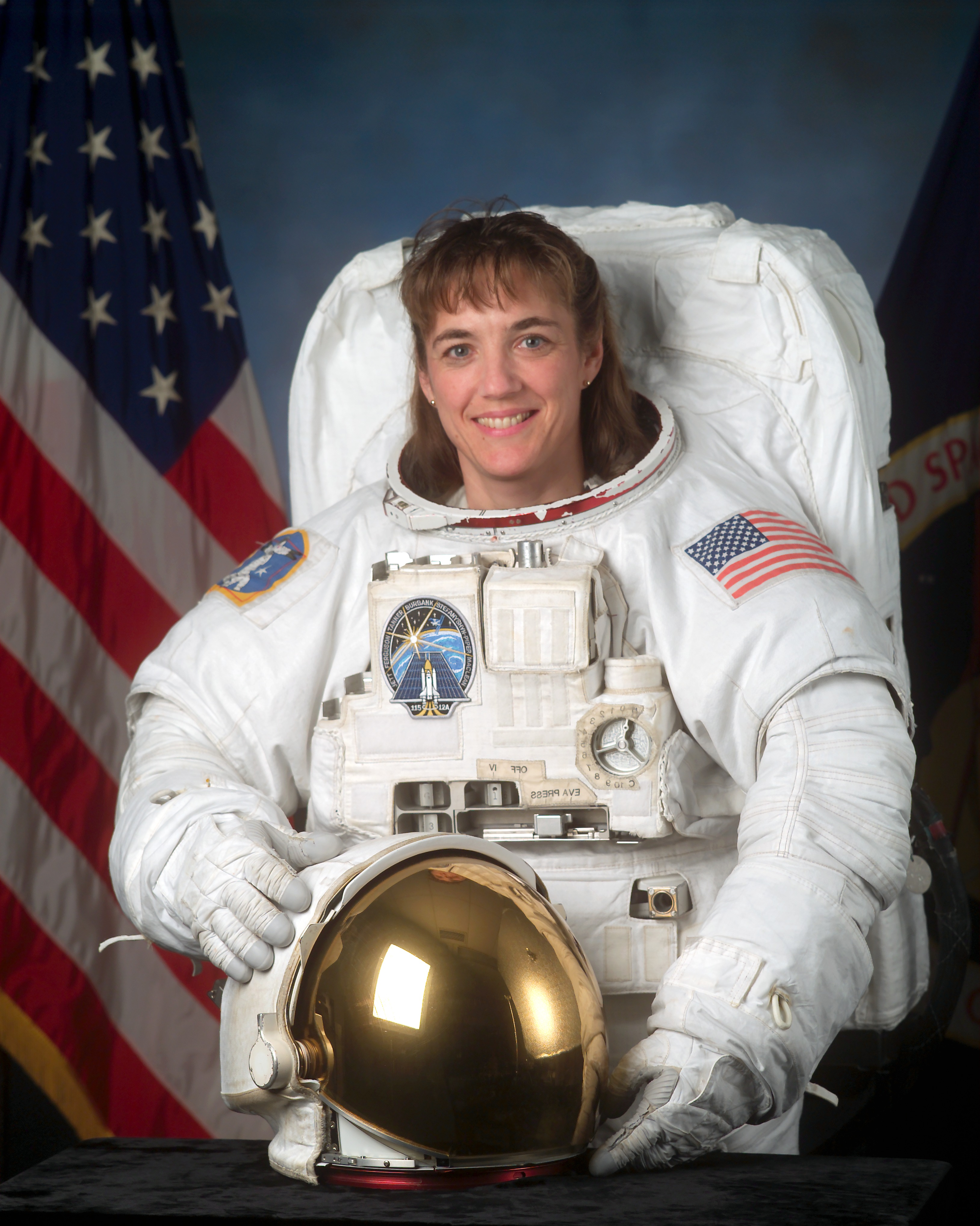
- Stefanyshyn-Piper in 2003
- Born: Heidemarie Martha Stefanyshyn; February 7, 1963 (age 63); St. Paul, Minnesota, U.S.
- Education: Massachusetts Institute of Technology (BS, MS)
- Spouse: Glenn A. Piper
- Children: 1
- Space career

NASA astronaut
- Rank: Captain, USN
- Time in space: 27d 15h 36m
- Selection: NASA Group 16 (1996)
- Total EVAs: 5
- Total EVA time: 33h 42m
- Mission: STS-115; STS-126
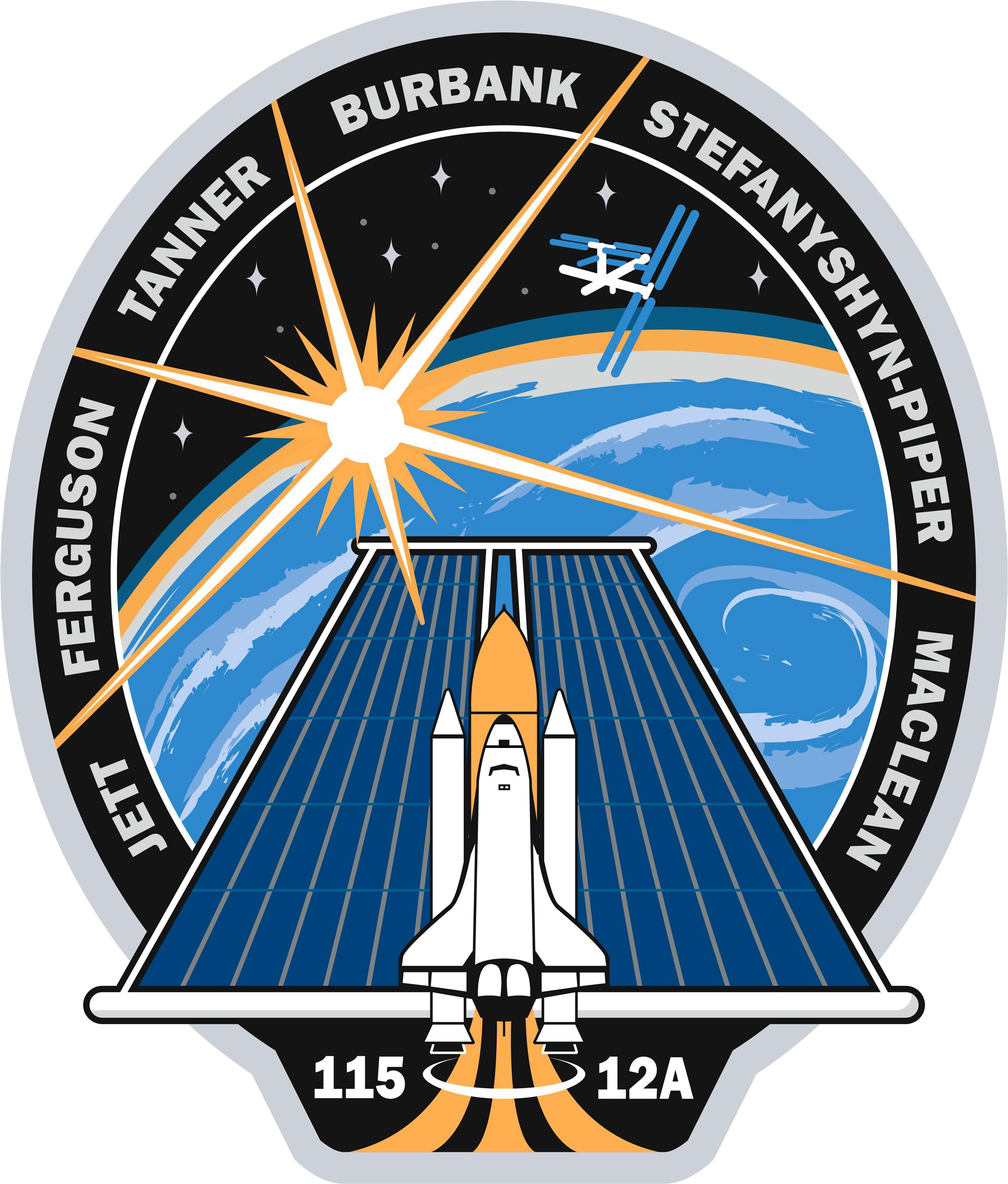
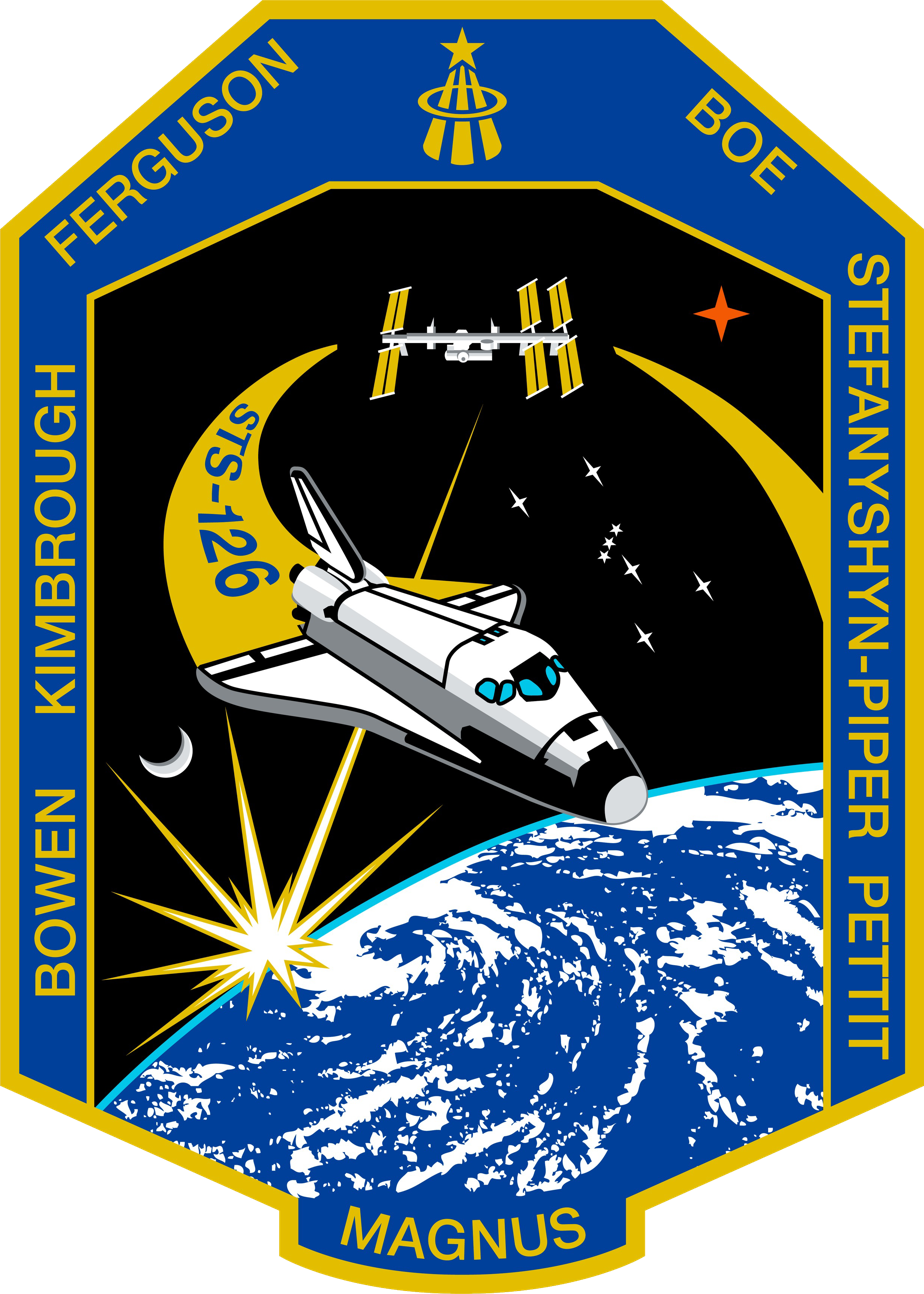
- Mission insignia
- Retired: July 2009

Heidemarie Martha Stefanyshyn-Piper (born February 7, 1963) is an American Naval officer and former NASA astronaut. She has achieved the rank of Captain in the United States Navy. She is also a qualified and experienced salvage officer. Her major salvage projects include de-stranding the tanker Exxon Houston off the coast of Barbers Point, on the island of Oahu, Hawaii, and developing the plan for the Peruvian Navy salvage of the Peruvian submarine Pacocha.

Stefanyshyn-Piper has received numerous honors and awards, such as the Meritorious Service Medal, two Navy Commendation Medals, and two Navy Achievement Medals. She has flown on two Space Shuttle missions, STS-115 and STS-126, during which she completed five spacewalks totaling 33 hours and 42 minutes. As of 2017, she ranks 39th on the all-time list of space walkers by duration.

== Early life and education ==
Stefanyshyn-Piper was born in St. Paul, Minnesota, United States, of Ukrainian-American heritage. Her father, Michael (Mykhailo) Stefanyshyn, now deceased, was born in Polish-governed Halychyna (today in Ukraine), and sent to work in Germany during World War II. After the end of the war, he married a German woman and they both immigrated to the U.S. Stefanyshyn-Piper's mother, Adelheid Stefanyshyn, lived in St. Paul until her death in 2018. Stefanyshyn-Piper was raised in the Ukrainian cultural community of Minneapolis–Saint Paul, is a member of Plast – a Ukrainian scouting organization, and speaks Ukrainian.

Stefanyshyn-Piper graduated in 1980 from what was then the all-girls Derham Hall High School in St. Paul, and holds Bachelor of Science (1984) and Master of Science (1985) degrees in mechanical engineering from the Massachusetts Institute of Technology (MIT). She is a licensed ham radio operator with Technician License KD5TVR.

Stefanyshyn-Piper married Glenn A. Piper, and they have one son. Stefanyshyn-Piper hyphenated her surname after marriage to serve as a reminder of her family roots.

== Military career ==
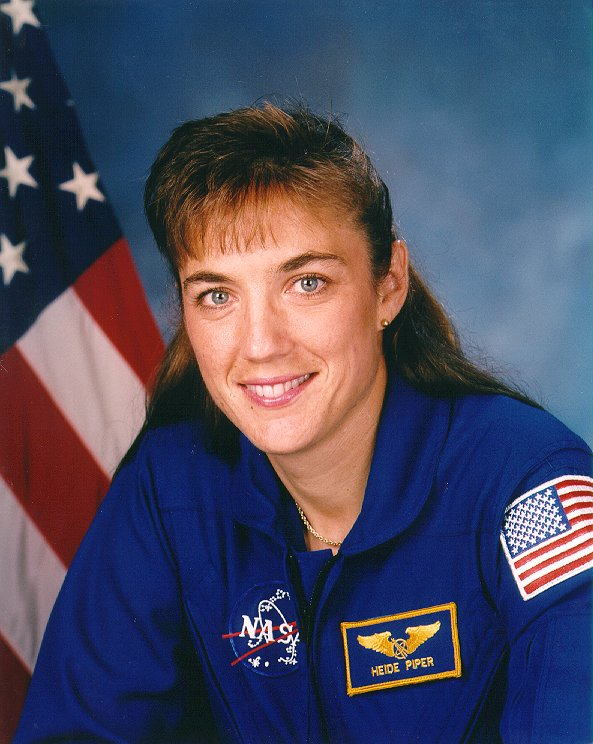
Stefanyshyn-Piper

Stefanyshyn-Piper received her commission from the Naval ROTC Program at MIT in June 1985. She completed training at the Naval Diving and Salvage Training Center in Panama City, Florida as a Navy Basic Diving Officer and Salvage Officer. During her Salvage tour, she participated in the de-stranding of the tanker Exxon Houston off the coast of Barbers Point in Hawaii. As of July 2009, Stefanyshyn-Piper was a Captain in the United States Navy.

During her military career, she was awarded: the Defense Superior Service Medal, two Legion of Merit medals, the Defense Meritorious Service Medal, the Meritorious Service Medal, two Navy Commendation Medals, two Navy Achievement Medals, and other service medals.

== NASA career ==
Selected as an astronaut candidate by NASA in April 1996, Stefanyshyn-Piper reported to the Johnson Space Center in August 1996. After two years of training and evaluation, she qualified for flight assignment as a mission specialist. Initially assigned to astronaut support duties for launch and landing, she has also served as lead Astronaut Office Representative for Payloads and in the Astronaut Office EVA branch.

=== STS-115 - Atlantis (September 9–21, 2006) ===
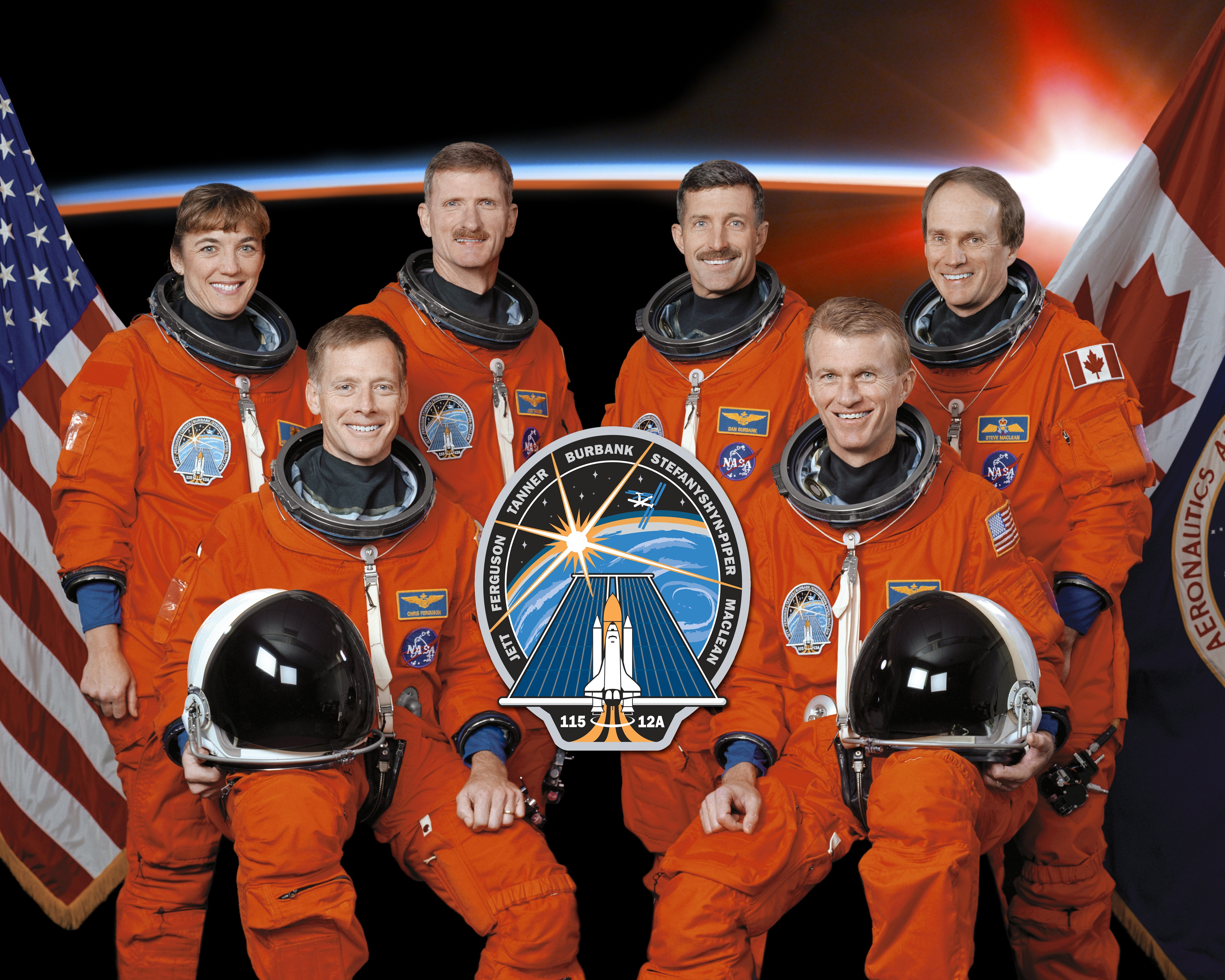
STS-115 crew

Stefanyshyn-Piper flew her first mission on STS-115, aboard Space Shuttle Atlantis (launched September 9, 2006, and returned September 21), as a mission specialist and became only the 8th woman to perform a spacewalk (out of 180 total spacewalkers). Stefanyshyn-Piper's participation in two of the mission's three EVAs for a total of 12 hours, 8 minutes made her the second most experienced female spacewalker. She also became the first Minnesota woman to go into space.

- EVA One (Duration 5 hours, 26 minutes) — With astronaut Joe Tanner, Stefanyshyn-Piper conducted initial installation of the P3/P4 truss onto the space station. Connected power cables on the truss, released the launch restraints on the solar array blanket box, the Beta Gimbal Assembly, and the solar array wings. Configured the Solar Alpha Rotary Joint (SARJ), and removed two circuit interrupt devices to prepare for STS-116. Stefanyshyn-Piper became the seventh American woman to conduct a spacewalk.
- EVA Three (Duration 6 hours, 42 minutes) — With astronaut Joe Tanner, Stefanyshyn-Piper installed a radiator onto the P3/4 truss, powered up a cooling radiator for the new solar arrays, replaced an S-Band radio antenna, and installed insulation for another antenna. Tanner took photos of the shuttle's wings using an infrared camera to test the camera's ability to detect damage.

During her pre-flight interview, she described her philosophy about human exploration of space:

To me exploring space is just a natural progression of, where humans are going. As we become more advanced and we have more technology to go farther. Thousands of years ago people would just go beyond the next hill, go over the mountain, go across the river. Then it led to going across the oceans. And, then it was "OK, let's go into the skies." We now have airplanes. We can fly. We have submarines and submersibles; we can go into the waters. So looking into the skies and looking at the stars and at the planets and thinking, what's out there... We're curious. We, as humans always want to know what's out there. To me it, it just seems natural that we've looked around here and we're just going to go look out farther. We're still developing the means to go out there farther. But that's just where we're going to go next. To me, exploration makes sense because we're always looking at what's the next thing out there -- what else can we learn, and how can we go there. Maybe we can learn something that we can bring back here and help solve some of the problems we have on Earth.

Piper fainted twice during the STS-115 welcome home ceremony. The NASA flight surgeon who assisted her noted that "for a returning astronaut, the symptoms she experienced are very normal for what can occur during re-adaptation". Ever since then, astronauts sit during post-flight interviews.

=== NEEMO 12 (May 7–18, 2007) ===
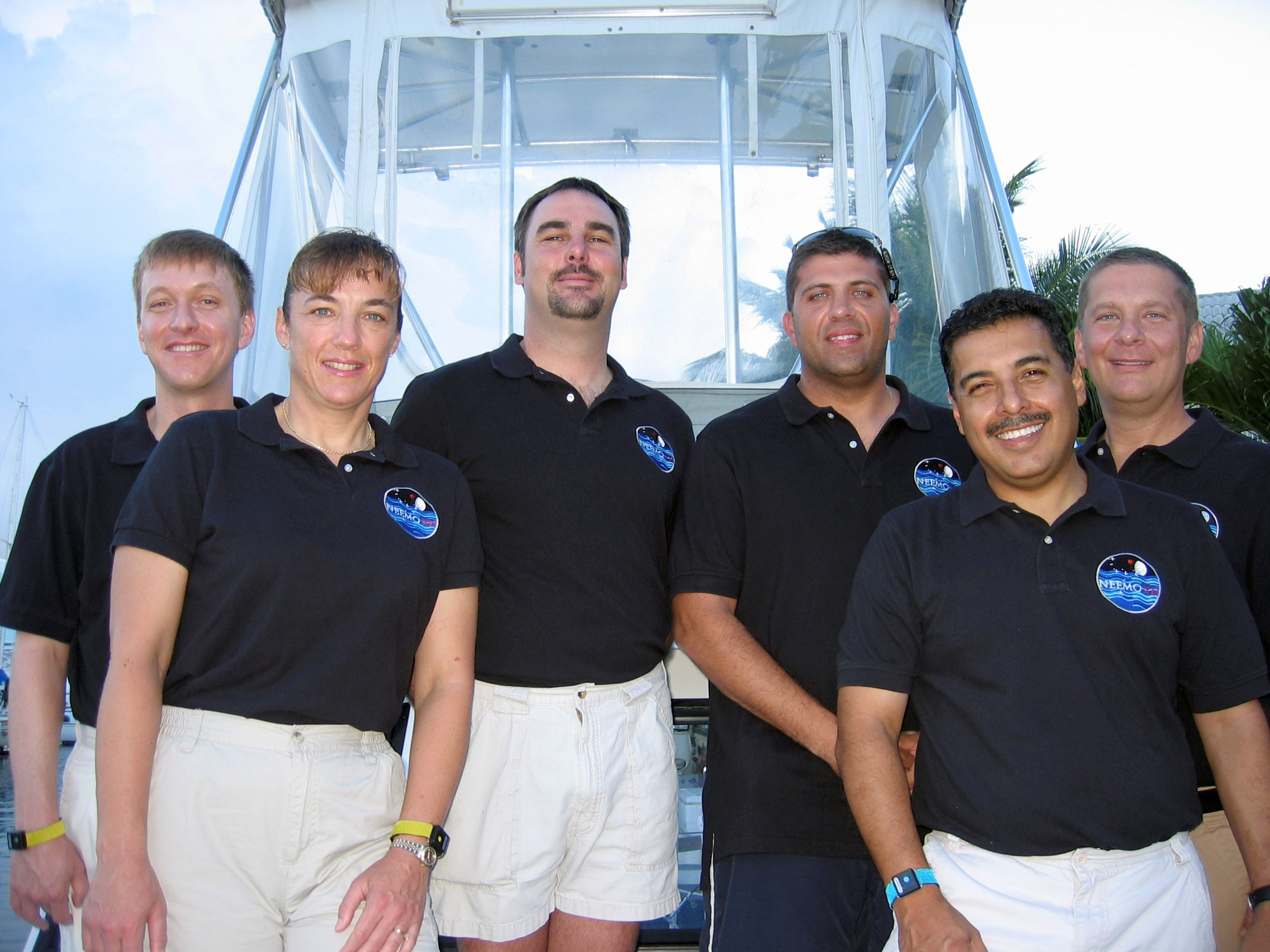
The NEEMO 12 crew. L-R: Josef Schmid, Stefanyshyn-Piper, James Talacek, Dominic Landucci, José M. Hernández and Timothy J. Broderick.

Stefanyshyn-Piper was commander of the 12th expedition of NASA Extreme Environment Mission Operations (NEEMO), a NASA program for studying human survival in the Aquarius underwater laboratory in preparation for future space exploration.

=== STS-126 - Endeavour (November 14–30, 2008) ===
Stefanyshyn-Piper flew as a mission specialist on STS-126, aboard Space Shuttle Endeavour (launched November 14, 2008, and returned November 30), during which she participated in and was Lead Spacewalker on three of four spacewalks. The mission ended when Endeavour landed successfully at Edwards Air Force Base, California. Following Stefanyshyn-Piper's third spacewalk during STS-126, her fifth overall, her total time in EVA became 33 hours, 42 minutes, putting her in twenty-fifth place for total time in EVA.

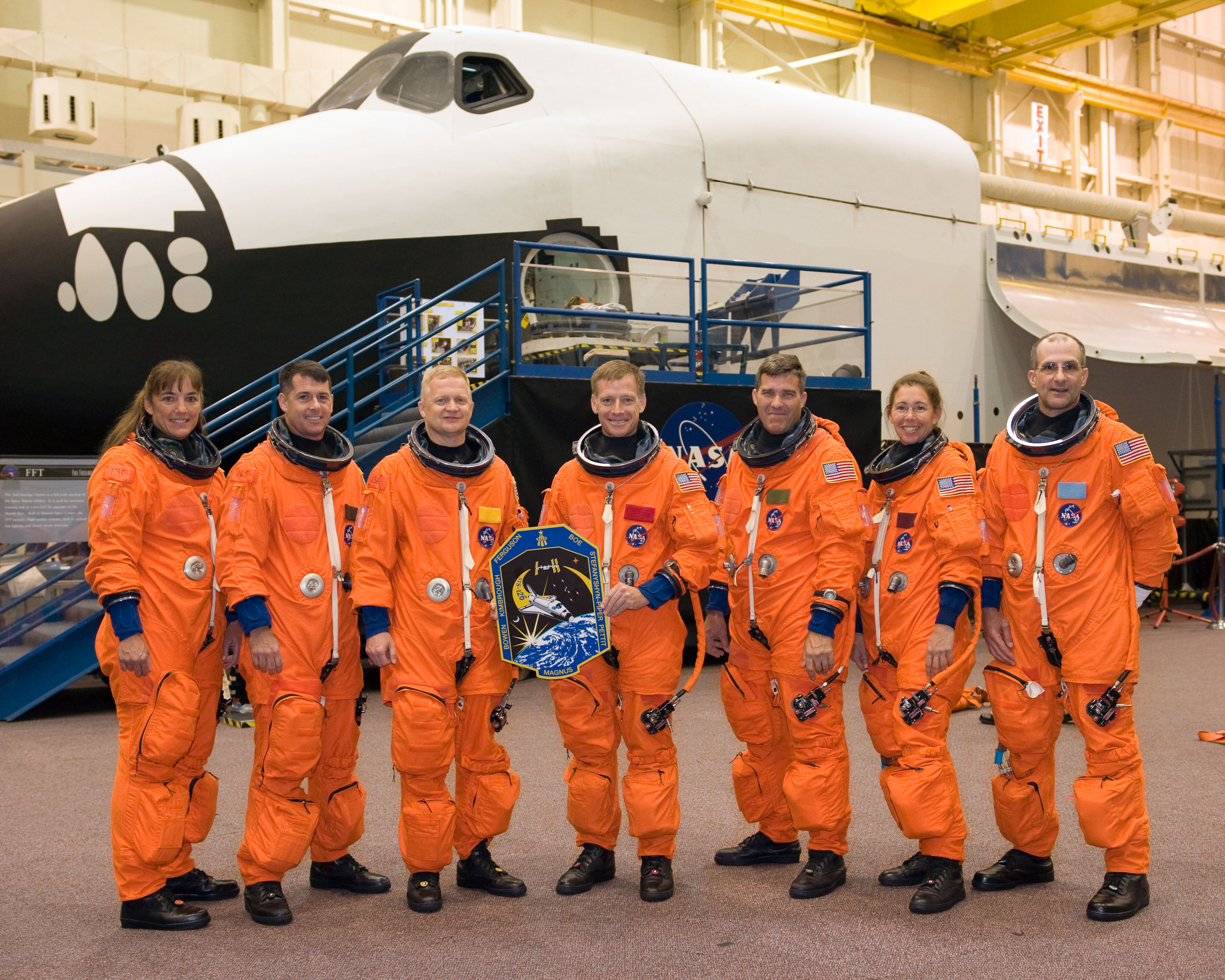
STS-126 crew

- EVA One (Duration 6 hours, 52 minutes) — With astronaut Stephen G. Bowen, Stefanyshyn-Piper transferred an empty nitrogen tank assembly from ESP3 to the shuttle's cargo bay, transferred a new flex hose rotary coupler to ESP3 for future use, removed an insulation cover on the Kibo External Facility berthing mechanism, began cleaning and lubrication of the starboard SARJ, and replacement of its 11 trundle bearing assemblies.
- EVA Two (Duration 6 hours, 45 minutes) — With astronaut Robert S. Kimbrough, Stefanyshyn-Piper relocated the two Crew and Equipment Translation Aid (CETA) carts from the starboard side of the Mobile Transporter to the port side, lubricated the station robotic arm's latching end effector A snare bearings, continued cleaning and lubrication of the starboard SARJ. EVA was conducted on the station's tenth anniversary.
- EVA Three (Duration 6 hours, 57 minutes) -- With astronaut Stephen G. Bowen, Stefanyshyn-Piper completed cleaning and lubrication of all but one of the trundle bearing assemblies (TBA) on the starboard SARJ. The final TBA was replaced during EVA 4.

==== Lost tool bag during spacewalk ====
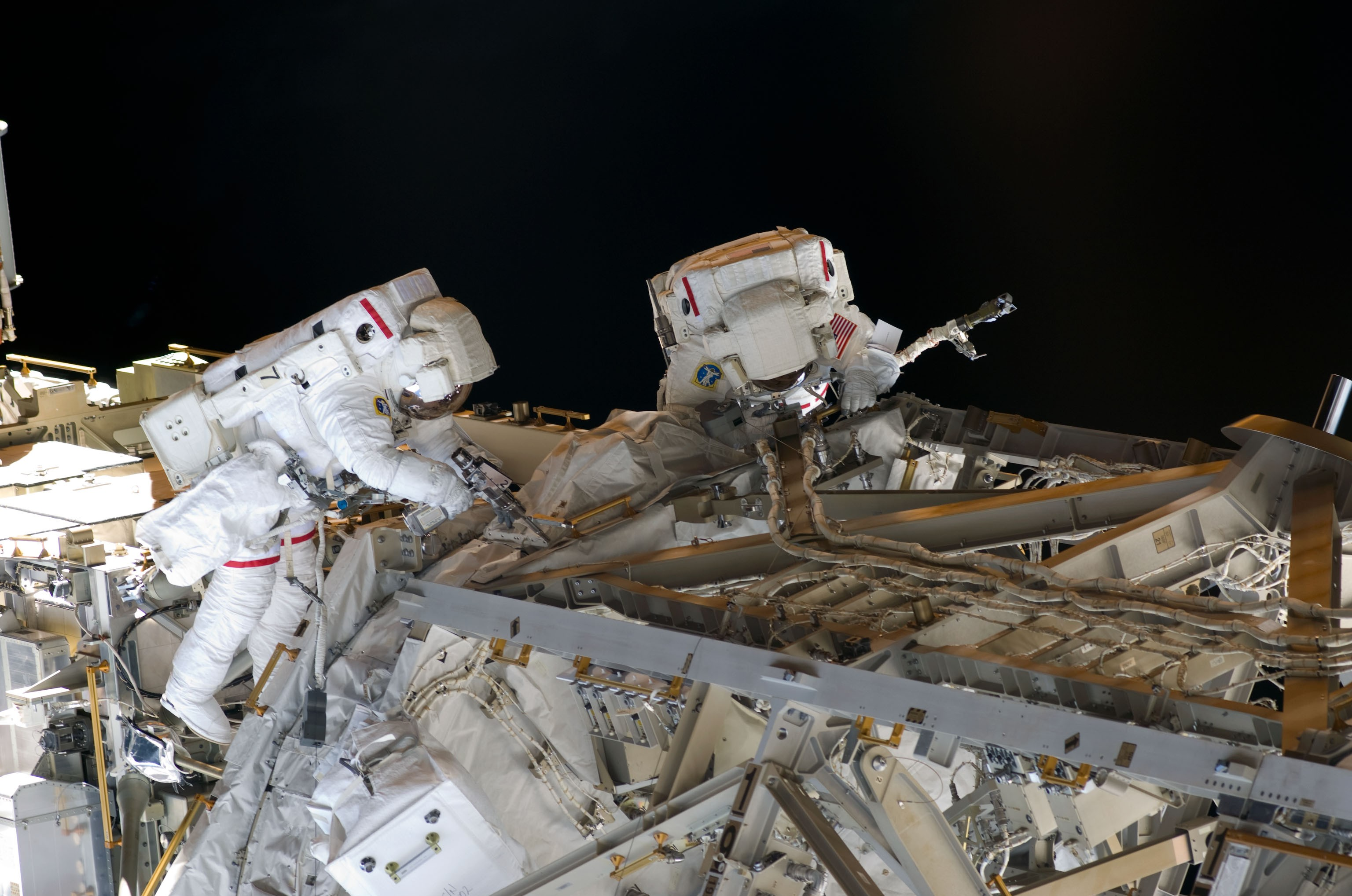
Stefanyshyn-Piper (left) and Shane Kimbrough, STS-126 mission specialists, in the mission's second scheduled session of EVA on the International Space Station

During the first EVA of STS-126 on November 18, 2008, as Stefanyshyn-Piper was preparing to begin work on the Solar Alpha Rotary Joint, she noticed a significant amount of grease in her tool bag. "I think we had a grease gun explode in the large bag, because there's grease in the bag," Stefanyshyn-Piper reported to Kimbrough, who was working inside the shuttle to help coordinate the EVA. Mission Control managers instructed Stefanyshyn-Piper to clean up the grease using a dry wipe, and while she was doing the cleanup, she accidentally pushed aside the bag. "I guess one of my crew lock bags was not transferred and it's loose," Stefanyshyn-Piper told Kimbrough. The bag floated aft and starboard of the station, and did not pose a risk to the station or orbiter. The bag and its contents entered Low Earth Orbit as space debris, where it eventually burned-up as it entered the Earth's atmosphere west of Mexico on August 3, 2009. When in orbit, it was visible from the ground using a telescope.

After taking an inventory of the items inside the lost bag, managers on the ground determined that Bowen had all those items in his bag, and the two could share equipment. While it extended the EVA duration slightly, the major objectives were not changed. The estimated value of the equipment lost is US$100,000.

During the Mission Status Briefing, lead International Space Station Flight Director Ginger Kerrick said that there was no way to know what caused the bag to come loose. "We don't know that this incident occurred because they forgot to tether something. We don't know if perhaps the hook just came loose inside the bag," Kerrick said. "You've got to remember, we are working with humans here and we are prone to human error. We do the best we can, and we learn from our mistakes." Said Stefanyshyn-Piper of the incident, "that definitely was not the high point of the EVA. It was very disheartening to watch it float away."

== Retirement from NASA ==
In July 2009, Stefanyshyn-Piper retired from NASA's Astronaut Corps to return to her Navy duties.

Fellow astronaut Steven Lindsey, Chief of the Astronaut Office at the Johnson Space Center in Houston, stated on her retirement: "Heide has been an outstanding astronaut, contributing significantly to the Space Shuttle and Space Station programs. In particular, her superb leadership as lead spacewalker during the STS-126 mission resulted in restoring full power generation capability to the International Space Station. We wish her the best of luck back in the Navy – she will be missed." She was awarded two NASA Space Flight Medals, and the NASA Exceptional Service Medal.

In August 2009, Stefanyshyn-Piper reported to the Naval Sea Systems Command as the chief technology officer.

== Further Navy career ==
On May 20, 2011, Captain Stefanyshyn-Piper became commander of the Carderock Division of the Naval Surface Warfare Center in Maryland.

Stefanyshyn-Piper retired from the U.S. Navy after 30 years of active duty service on July 1, 2015.
