= Ken Money =

Canadian high jumper and scientist (1935–2023)

Ken Money MSC
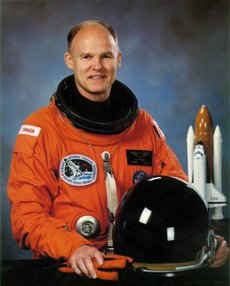
- Money in 1991
- Born: Kenneth Eric Money; January 4, 1935; Toronto, Ontario, Canada
- Died: March 6, 2023 (aged 88); Toronto, Ontario, Canada
- Occupation: Scientist
- Space career

NRC/CSA astronaut
- Selection: 1983 NRC Group
- Missions: None

Kenneth Eric Money MSC (January 4, 1935 – March 6, 2023) was a Canadian scientist specializing in the human ear and an Olympic high jumper. He worked at the Defence and Civil Institute of Environmental Medicine in Toronto. He published over one hundred science articles and authored six different topics in the World Book Encyclopedia.

== Education ==
Money attended North Toronto Collegiate Institute for high school. He then enrolled at the University of Toronto and earned a Bachelor of Science in physiology and chemistry in 1958, a Master of Science in physiology in 1959, and a Ph.D. in physiology in 1961.

== Sports ==
In 1956, Money competed in the Olympic Games and placed fifth in the high jump. His personal best in this event was 2.03 m.

== Research ==
Some of his contributions in the scientific field include knowledge of the inner ear, motion sickness, disorientation, and biological effects of space flight. Other of Money's interests included badminton, skiing, acrobatic flying, skydiving, fishing, and reading.

Money was selected by the National Research Council of Canada as an astronaut candidate in December 1983, but left the Canadian Astronaut Corps in 1992 without having flown in space. He acted as Spacelab Payload Operations Controller for a Spacelab mission in 1992. During the same mission, Money served as the alternate astronaut, having the capability to fly if needed.

Money is credited with the invention of an experimental surgical operation called semicircular canal plugging, which is now being used in North America and Europe to treat particular types of dizzy spells. He also worked part-time as a professor of physiology for the University of Toronto and regularly lectured to undergraduate classes.

== Personal life and death ==
Ken Money had a brother Bill, who predeceased him. Ken died at the Sunnybrook Veterans Centre in Toronto, on March 6, 2023. He was 88, and he was survived by his wife Sheila Money (née Donnelly). They married around 1958 and had a daughter Laura and three grandchildren.

== Awards and service ==
In 1994, he was awarded the Meritorious Service Cross by the Governor General of Canada for his many contributions to science and technology.

Money was also a member of the volunteer Board of Governors of the National Space Society, a non-profit space advocacy group founded by Wernher von Braun.
