= Roberta Bondar =

Canadian astronaut (born 1945)

Roberta Bondar CC OOnt FRCPC FRSC
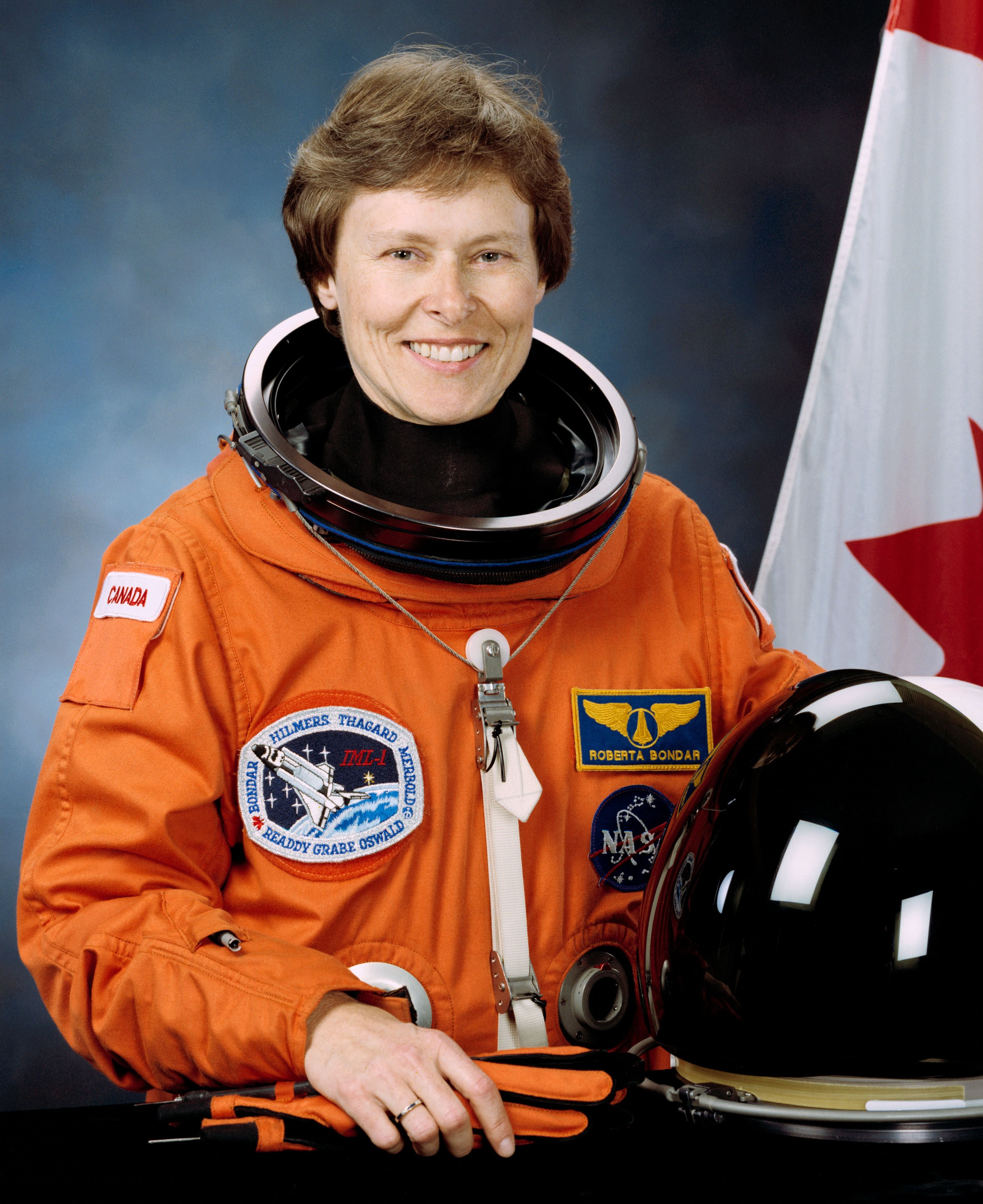
- Bondar in 1991
- Born: December 4, 1945 (age 80); Sault Ste. Marie, Ontario, Canada
- Education: University of Guelph (BSc); University of Western Ontario (MSc); Erindale College, Toronto (PhD); McMaster University (MD)
- Occupations: Neurologist; scientist; educator; author; photographer; astronaut
- Space career

NRC/CSA astronaut
- Status: Retired
- Time in space: 8 days, 1 hour, 14 minutes
- Selection: 1983 NRC Group
- Missions: STS-42
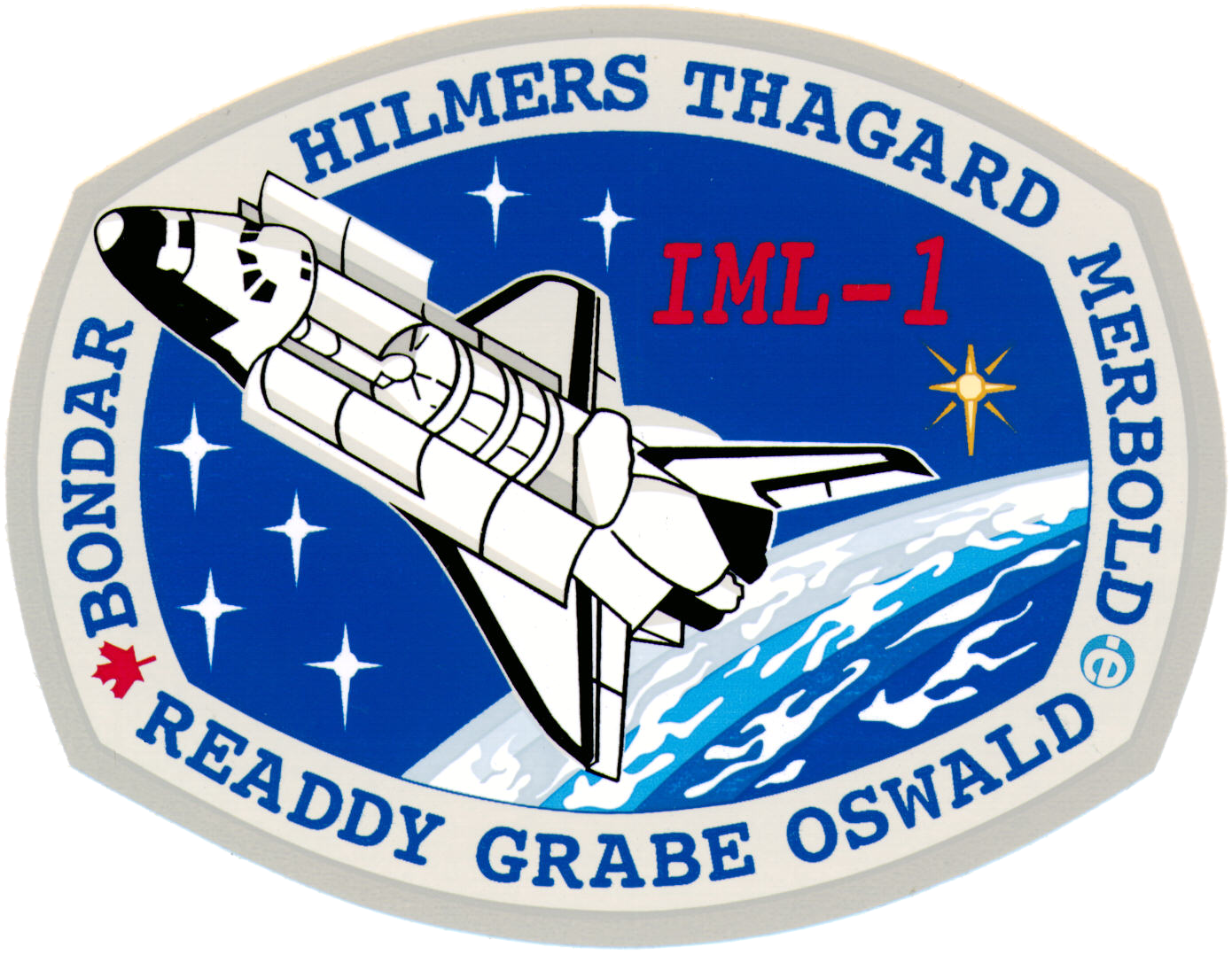
- Mission insignia
- Scientific career
- Fields: Neurobiology
- Thesis: Neurofibrillar and neurofilamentous changes in goldfish (Carassius auratus L.) in relation to temperature (1974)
- Doctoral advisor: Betty Ida Roots

Roberta Lynn Bondar (/ˈbɒndər/; born December 4, 1945) is a Canadian astronaut, neurologist and consultant. She is Canada's first female astronaut and the first neurologist in space.

After more than a decade as head of an international space medicine research team collaborating with NASA, Bondar became a consultant and speaker in the business, scientific, and medical communities.

Roberta Bondar has received many honours including appointment as a Companion of the Order of Canada and the Order of Ontario, the NASA Space Flight Medal, over 28 honorary degrees, induction into the Canadian Medical Hall of Fame, the International Women's Forum Hall of Fame and a star on Canada's Walk of Fame.

== Early life and education ==
Bondar was born in Sault Ste. Marie, Ontario, on December 4, 1945, the second daughter of Mildred (née Gourlay) and Edward Bondar who was of Ukrainian descent. Her father, a manager with the city's Public Utilities Commission and her mother, an educator who taught business and commerce, encouraged their children academically and in extra-curricular activities.

Her fascination with the sciences began as a child. When she was 7, her father built a lab in the basement where she conducted experiments. In grade school she was awarded first place for an oral presentation on waterpower. But space flight particularly held her imagination. She built rocket models, and her aunt, who worked at Cape Canaveral, would send her posters and crests from the U.S. space program.

An experience in grade school of being passed over for an opportunity for a boy classmate who hadn't scored as well on a qualification exam made Bondar especially driven to prove herself academically. She later explained that she wanted "to be as qualified as possible, so if people didn't want me, they'd have to say, look, you're a woman and I don't think you can do it."

She attended Sir James Dunn Collegiate and Vocational School in Sault Ste. Marie, graduating in 1964. A science project she conducted on the biology of the forest tent caterpillar won a local Rotary science fair award and was promoted to the 1963 Canada-wide science fair in Toronto. The project also earned her a summer job studying the spruce budworm at what is today the federal Great Lakes Forestry Centre.

Bondar was also an accomplished athlete in high school, rising to captain of her basketball team. She was named the school's sportswoman of the year in 1963. At graduation in 1964, she received the school's athletic leadership trophy and scholarship.

Bondar received an extensive university education in the sciences and medicine. She received a Bachelor of Science in zoology and agriculture from the University of Guelph (1968), a Masters of Science in experimental pathology from the University of Western Ontario (1971), a Doctor of Philosophy in neuroscience from Erindale College in the University of Toronto (1974), and a Doctor of Medicine from McMaster University (1977). Part of her undergraduate research experience included work with the Canadian Department of Fisheries and Forestry.

== Career ==
As one of the first six members of the Canadian Astronaut Corps selected in 1983, Bondar began astronaut training in 1984, and in 1992 she was designated Payload Specialist for the first International Microgravity Laboratory Mission (IML-1). Bondar flew on the NASA Space Shuttle Discovery during Mission STS-42, January 22–30, 1992, during which she performed over 40 experiments in the Spacelab. Her work studying the effects of low-gravity situations on the human body allowed NASA to prepare astronauts for long stays in the space station.

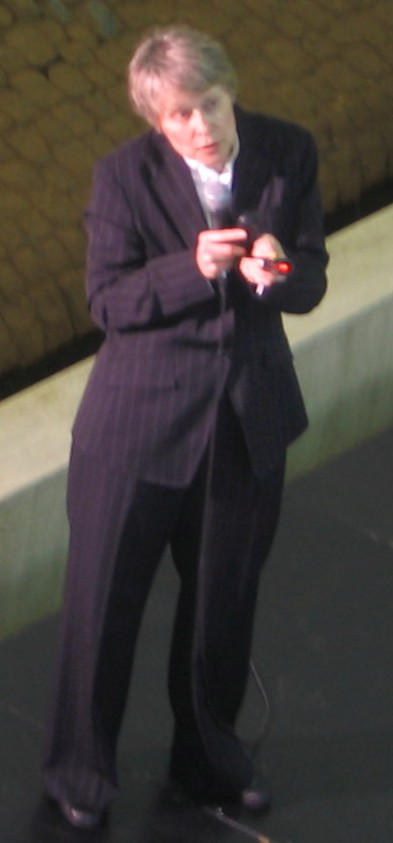
Bondar giving an environmentalism presentation in 2007

After her astronaut career, Bondar led an international team of researchers at NASA for more than a decade, examining data obtained from astronauts on space missions to better understand the mechanisms underlying the body's ability to recover from exposure to space. Bondar's research in space recovery considered the linkage to Parkinson's disease in addition to other neurological effects.

Bondar pursued her interests in photography with an emphasis on natural environments; she was an Honors student in Professional Nature Photography at the Brooks Institute of Photography, Santa Barbara, California. She is the author of four photo essay books that feature her photography of the Earth. These published books include Landscape of Dreams, Passionate Vision: Discovering Canada's National Parks, The Arid Edge of Earth, and Touching the Earth. Bondar was also a sky diver, underwater diver and pilot.

Bondar has also been a consultant and speaker to diverse organizations, drawing on her expertise as an astronaut, physician, scientific researcher, photographer, author, environment interpreter, and team leader. Not only can interviews from radio and TV be found of Bondar, but she also played a role in the movie Destiny in Space. Furthermore, Bondar's expertise was consulted in programs that captured both the literal and figurative takeoff of groundbreaking science—that is, the space shuttle.

In 2009, Bondar registered The Roberta Bondar Foundation as a not-for-profit charity. The foundation focuses on environmental awareness.

== Honours, awards, and tributes ==
Bondar is the recipient of multiple honours and awards from organizations and universities across Canada. These honours include the Vanier Award in 1985 and the F.W. (Casey) Baldwin Award in 1985.

Bondar was the first astronaut to receive a star on Canada's Walk of Fame. It was inducted on October 1, 2011, at the Elgin Theatre in Toronto.

The Roberta Bondar Park and Tent Pavilion is located in Bondar's home town (Sault Ste. Marie) in honour of the first female astronaut. Bondar also has multiple public schools named after her.

Bondar served two terms as the Chancellor of Trent University, from 2003 to 2009.

In 2009, Concordia University awarded Bondar the prestigious Loyola Medal.

In 2017, the Royal Canadian Mint released a limited edition 25th anniversary $25 coin entitled "A View of Canada from Space". The unveiling of this honour was done in her hometown of Sault Ste. Marie at Sault College on November 1, 2016.

In 2018, Thebacha and Wood Buffalo Astronomical Society renamed its observatory to The Dr. Roberta Bondar Northern Observatory.

== Organizations ==
| Status | Organization |
|---|---|
| Fellow | Royal College of Physicians and Surgeons of Canada |
| Member | American Academy of Neurology |
| Member | Canadian Neurological Society |
| Member | Canadian Aeronautics and Space Institute |
| Member | Canadian Society of Aerospace Medicine |
| Member | College of Physicians and Surgeons of Ontario |
| Member | Canadian Stroke Society |
| Member | Aerospace Medical Association |
| Member | Albuquerque Aerostat Ascension Association |
| Member | American Society for Gravitational and Space Biology |

Academic offices
| Preceded by Peter Gzowski | Chancellor of Trent University; 2003–2009 | Succeeded by Tom Jackson |
