= Canadian Astronaut Corps =

Canadian Space Agency unit

The Canadian Astronaut Corps (French: Corps canadien des astronautes) is a unit of the Canadian Space Agency (CSA) that selects, trains, and provides astronauts as crew members for U.S. and Russian space missions. As of November 2026, the corps has three active members.

== History ==
The original six astronauts selected in 1983 were under the auspices of the National Research Council of Canada. They were transferred to the Canadian Space Agency when it was established in 1989.

Since 1984, when Marc Garneau became the first Canadian in space, nine CSA astronauts have flown on US NASA Space Shuttles and on Russian Soyuz spacecraft in 15 missions.

In May 2009, Robert Thirsk flew to the International Space Station (ISS) for a six-month stay, thus becoming the first Canadian to stay aboard the ISS for an extended period. On December 1, 2009, after spending 188 days in space, he returned to Earth aboard a Soyuz spacecraft. Canadian astronaut Chris Hadfield, the first Canadian commander of the ISS, went on to achieve worldwide fame in 2013 for releasing a music video he recorded on the ISS of his version of David Bowie's song "Space Oddity". Astronaut Julie Payette went on to serve as the governor general of Canada, and Garneau became Minister of Foreign Affairs.

In April 2026, during the Artemis II mission, Canadian astronaut Jeremy Hansen became the first non-American to travel beyond low Earth orbit and to the vicinity of the Moon.

== Organization ==
The Astronauts Corps is one of seven main divisions within the CSA. In addition to its Astronaut Corps, one of the most prominent contributions of Canada to space exploration is the robotic arm on the US Space Shuttles, the Canadarm.

There are three active astronauts in the corps (David Saint-Jacques, Joshua Kutryk, and Jennifer Sidey-Gibbons) and eleven former astronauts, nine of whom have gone into space. Of the ten current and former Canadian astronauts who have gone into space, two are women: Julie Payette and Roberta Bondar.

== Qualifications ==
The CSA generally recruits astronauts who have degrees as scientists, engineers or medical doctors. In addition to being Canadian citizens or residents, candidates must meet certain physical standards (including height, weight, hearing, and visual acuity), as well as educational requirements.

== Members ==
=== Active astronauts ===
As of October 2026, the corps has three active astronauts, two male and one female. Only one has previously flown to space, and one has an assignment to future missions.

Missions in italics are scheduled and subject to change.

| Astronaut | Missions | Group |
|---|---|---|
| Jenni Gibbons | None, awaiting assignment | 2017 |
| Joshua Kutryk | 1: SpaceX Crew-13 (Expedition 75) | 2017 |
| David Saint-Jacques | 1: Soyuz MS-11 (Expedition 57/58/59) | 2009 |

=== Former astronauts ===
There are eleven former CSA astronauts.

| Astronaut | Missions | Group | Notes |
|---|---|---|---|
| Roberta Lynn Bondar | 1: STS-42 | 1983 | First Canadian woman in space |
| Marc Garneau | 3: STS-41-G, STS-77, STS-97 | 1983 | First Canadian in space |
| Chris Hadfield | 3: STS-74, STS-100, Soyuz TMA-07M (Expedition 34/35) | 1992 | Only Canadian to visit the Mir space station, first Canadian spacewalker, first Canadian commander of the ISS |
| Jeremy Hansen | 1: Artemis II | 2009 | First person not from the U.S. to travel beyond low Earth orbit and to the vicinity of the Moon |
| Steve MacLean | 2: STS-52, STS-115 | 1983 | |
| Michael McKay | None | 1992 | |
| Ken Money | None | 1983 | |
| Julie Payette | 2: STS-96, STS-127 | 1992 | First Canadian to visit the ISS |
| Robert Thirsk | 2: STS-78, Soyuz TMA-15 (Expedition 20/21) | 1983 | First Canadian to make a long-duration stay on the ISS |
| Bjarni Tryggvason | 1: STS-85 | 1983 | |
| Dafydd Williams | 2: STS-90, STS-118 | 1992 | |

=== Selection groups ===
- 1983 NRC Group: Roberta Bondar, Marc Garneau, Steve MacLean, Ken Money, Robert Thirsk and Bjarni Tryggvason (all transferred to CSA in 1989)
- 1992 CSA Group: Dafydd Williams, Julie Payette, Chris Hadfield and Michael McKay
- 2009 CSA Group: Jeremy Hansen and David Saint-Jacques
- 2017 CSA Group: Joshua Kutryk and Jenni Gibbons

== See also ==
- Other astronaut corps:
  - European Astronaut Corps
  - NASA Astronaut Corps (United States)
  - ISRO Astronaut Corps (India)
  - JAXA Astronaut Corps (Japan)
  - Roscosmos Cosmonaut Corps (Russia)
  - People's Liberation Army Astronaut Corps (China)
- List of astronauts by selection
- Human spaceflight
- History of spaceflight
