= Bjarni Tryggvason =

Icelandic-Canadian astronaut (1945–2022)

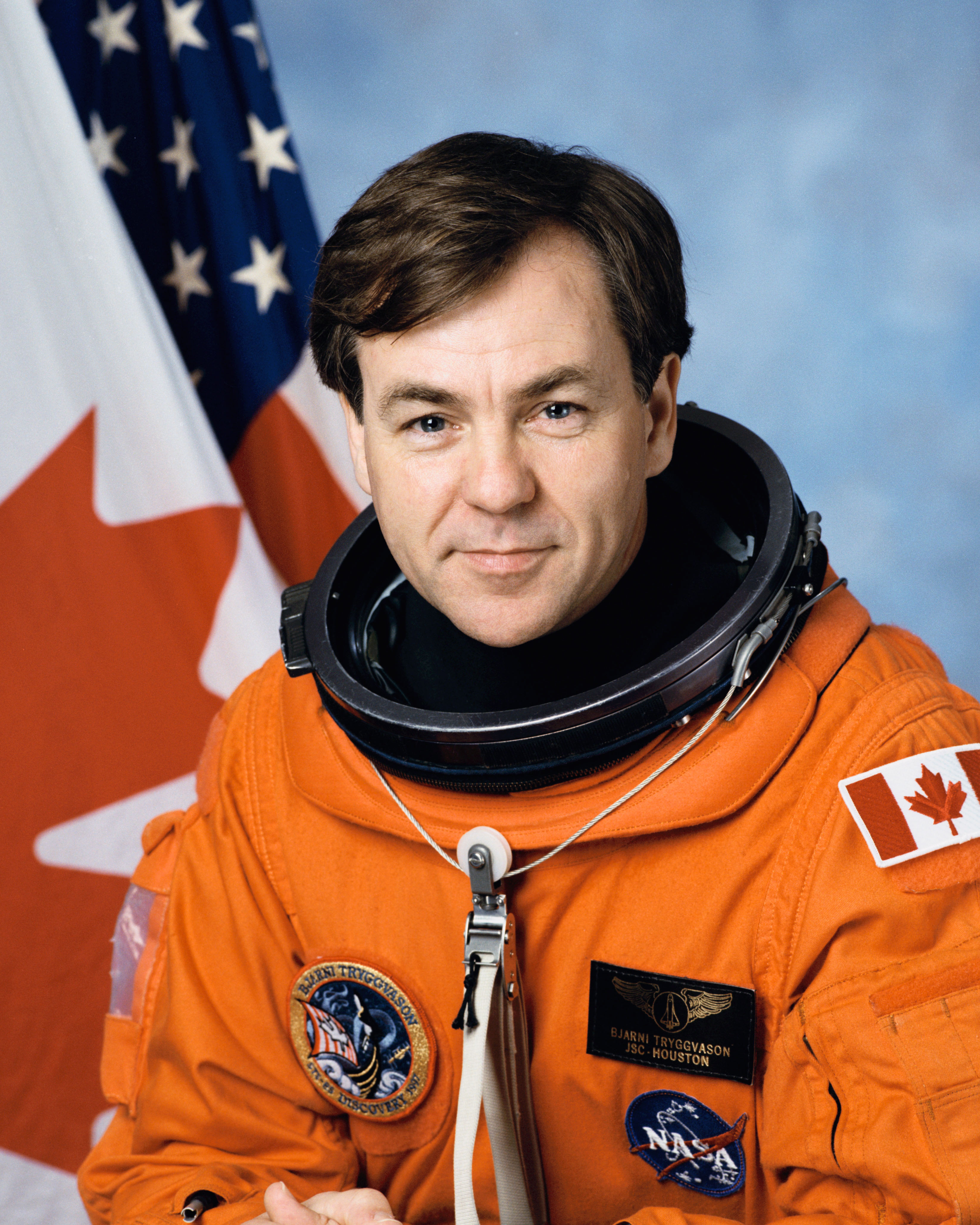
- Tryggvason in 1997
- Born: Bjarni Valdimar Tryggvason; September 21, 1945; Reykjavík, Iceland
- Died: April 5, 2022 (aged 76)
- Education: University of British Columbia (BS); University of Western Ontario
- Space career

NRC/CSA astronaut
- Time in space: 11 days, 20 hours, 28 minutes
- Selection: 1983 NRC Group; NASA Group 17 (1998)
- Missions: STS-85
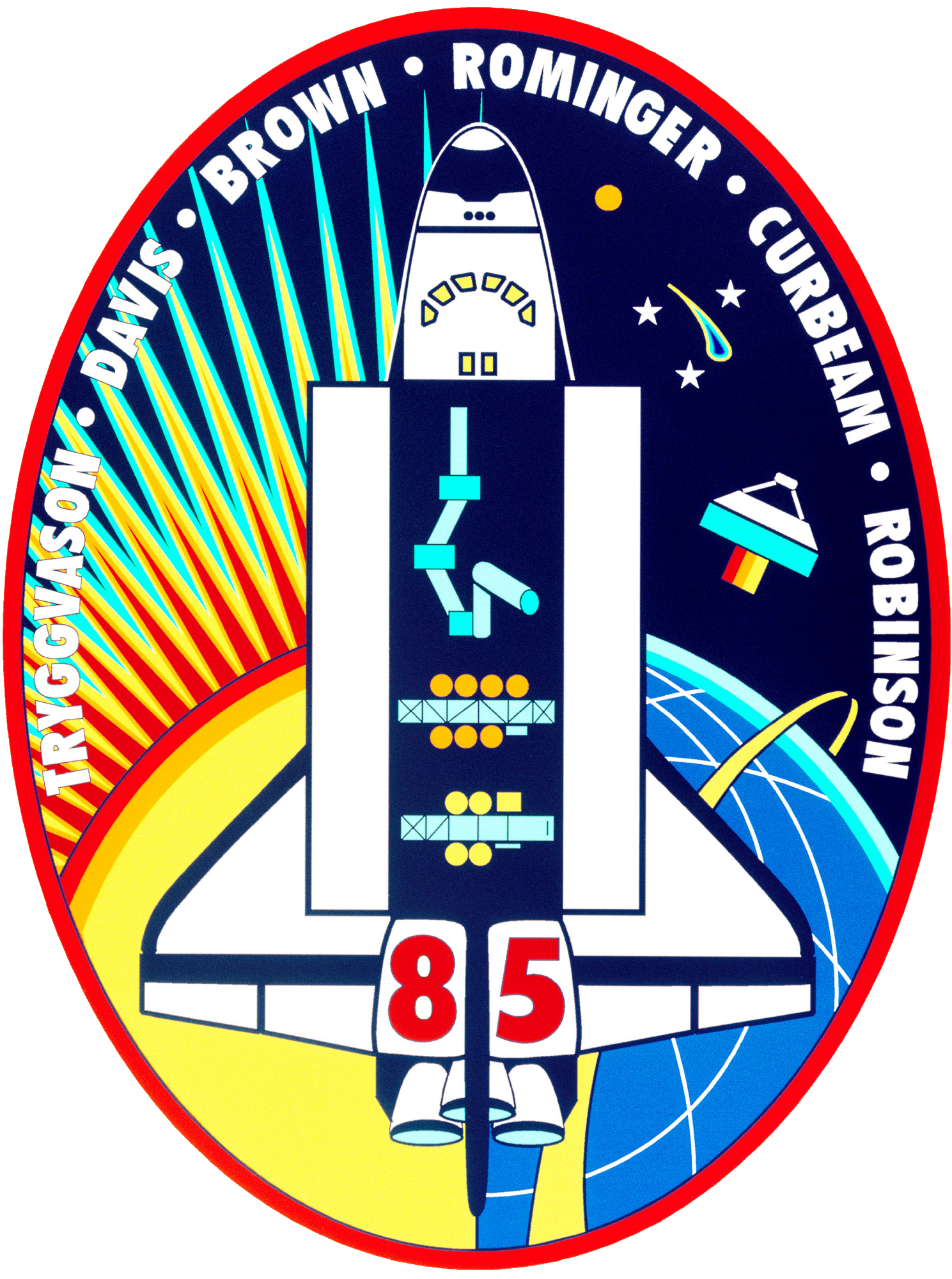
- Mission insignia

Bjarni Valdimar Tryggvason (September 21, 1945 – April 5, 2022) was an Icelandic-born Canadian engineer and a NRC/CSA astronaut. He served as a Payload Specialist on Space Shuttle mission STS-85 in 1997, a nearly 12-day mission to study changes in the Earth's atmosphere. Bjarni is the first, and as of 2024, only Canadian astronaut of Icelandic birth.

== Early life ==
Tryggvason was born in Reykjavík on September 21, 1945. He moved to Canada with his parents when he was eight, and grew up in Vancouver, British Columbia. After attending high school in Richmond, British Columbia, he obtained a B.A.Sc. degree in engineering physics from the University of British Columbia in 1972, and subsequently studied at the postgraduate level in engineering with specialization in applied mathematics and fluid dynamics at the University of Western Ontario.

== Academic career ==
Tryggvason worked as a meteorologist with the cloud physics group at the Atmospheric Environment Service in Toronto in 1972 and 1973. In 1974, he joined the University of Western Ontario to work as a research associate at the Boundary Layer Wind Tunnel Laboratory working on projects involving rigid and aero-elastic model studies of wind effects on structures. In 1987, he was a guest research associate at Kyoto University, Japan. This was followed by a similar position at James Cook University in Townsville, Australia. In late 1979, he returned to the University of Western Ontario as a lecturer in applied mathematics.

In 1982, Tryggvason joined the Low Speed Aerodynamics Laboratory at the National Research Council (NRC) in Ottawa. He became part of the NRC team assembled to study the sinking of the Ocean Ranger oil rig in support of the Royal Commission investigation. He designed and led the aerodynamics tests, which established the wind loads acting on the rig. Between 1981 and 1992, he was also a part-time lecturer at the University of Ottawa and Carleton University, teaching graduate courses on structural dynamics and random vibrations.

Tryggvason had about 4,000 hours of flight experience, held an Airline Transport Rating and had experience as a flight instructor. He was active in aerobatic flight and once qualified as captain in the Tutor jet trainer with the Royal Canadian Air Force.

== CSA career ==
Tryggvason was one of the six Canadian astronauts selected in December 1983, and was the first Canadian astronaut born in Iceland. He was back-up Payload Specialist to Steven MacLean for the CANEX-2 set of experiments which flew on Mission STS-52, October 22 to November 1, 1992. He was the Project Engineer for the design of the SVS target spacecraft which was deployed during that mission.

He was the principal investigator in the development of the Large Motion Isolation Mount, which has flown numerous times on the NASA Boeing KC-135 and DC-9 aircraft, for the Microgravity vibration Isolation Mount (MIM), which operated on the Russian Mir space station from April 1996 until January 1998, and for the MIM-2, which flew on STS-85 in August 1997. The MIM was used on the Mir to support several Canadian and US experiments in material science and fluid physics.

Tryggvason served as a payload specialist on STS-85 (August 7–19, 1997), a 12-day mission to study changes in the Earth's atmosphere. During the flight, his primary role was testing MIM-2 and performing fluid dynamics experiments designed to examine sensitivity to spacecraft vibrations. This work was directed at developing better understanding of the need for systems such as the MIM on the International Space Station (ISS) and on the effect of vibrations on the many experiments to be performed on the ISS. The mission was accomplished in 189 Earth orbits, traveling 4.7 million miles in 284 hours and 28 minutes.

In August 1998, Tryggvason became part of NASA Astronaut Group 17. Training consisted of two years of physical and academic training relating to future missions. The class was the first group of astronauts to be trained as both mission specialist for the Space Shuttle and as potential crewmembers for the ISS. He was initially assigned as a Shuttle Avionics Integration Laboratory (SAIL) crew representative. SAIL is used to test, check out, and verify Shuttle flight software prior to use. He also supported integrated simulations on the ISS Training Facility. This facility is used for ISS crew training as well as in support of training the ISS Mission Control team.

== Post-CSA career ==
Bjarni Tryggvason and son Michael talking to the crowd after completing five flights on the Silver Dart replica on February 22, 2009

Tryggvason retired from the Canadian Space Agency in June 2008. He returned to teaching at the University of Western Ontario. He also taught at the International Test Pilots School in London, Ontario, and continued to serve as a test pilot.

On February 22, 2009, Tryggvason piloted a replica of Alexander Graham Bell's Silver Dart, from the ice on Baddeck Bay, Cape Breton Island, Nova Scotia. The flight commemorated the centennial of the first flight in Canada and the British Empire. Due to poor weather conditions expected on the next day, the flight occurred one day before the actual centenary of the original Silver Dart's flight.

== Personal life and death ==
Tryggvason had two children. His son also went into aviation as a commercial pilot, while his daughter was a veterinarian. Tryggvason died on April 5, 2022, at the age of 76.

== Honors and affiliations ==
Tryggvason was a member of the Canadian Aeronautics and Space Institute. He was awarded an honorary D.Sc. degree from the University of Western Ontario in 1998, an honorary Dr. Techn. degree from the University of Iceland in 2000, and an honorary D.Eng. degree from the University of Victoria in 2005. He was furthermore awarded the NASA Space Flight Medal in 1997, the Innovators Award of the Canadian Space Agency in 2004, and the Knight's Cross of the Icelandic Order of the Falcon in 2000.
