= Steve MacLean (astronaut) =

Canadian astronaut (born 1953)

Steve MacLean FRCGS
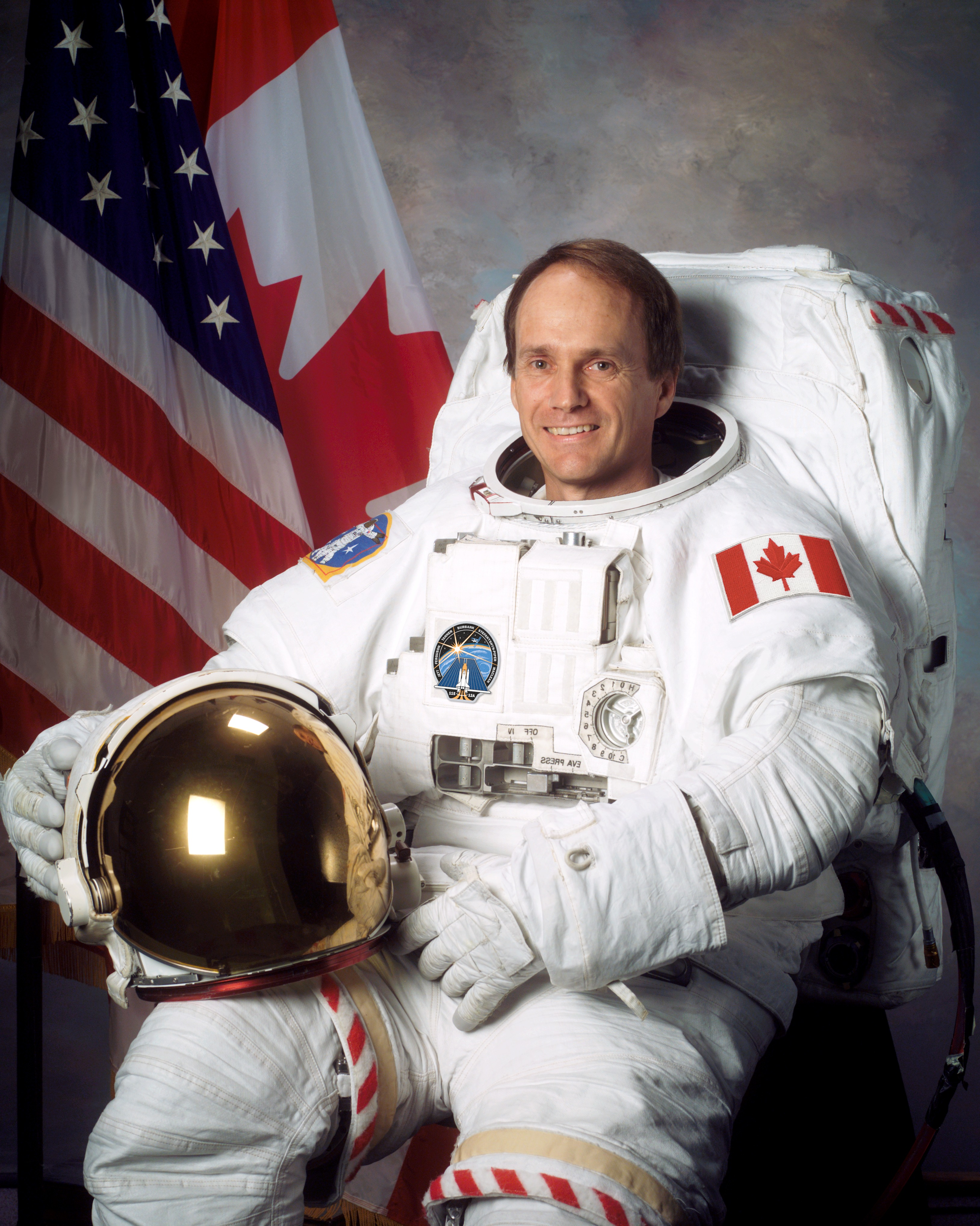
- Official portrait, 2002
- Born: Steven Glenwood MacLean; December 14, 1954 (age 71); Ottawa, Ontario, Canada
- Education: York University (BS, MS, PhD)
- Space career

NRC/CSA astronaut
- Time in space: 21 days, 16 hours, 2 minutes
- Selection: 1983 NRC Group; NASA Group 16 (1996)
- Missions: STS-52; STS-115
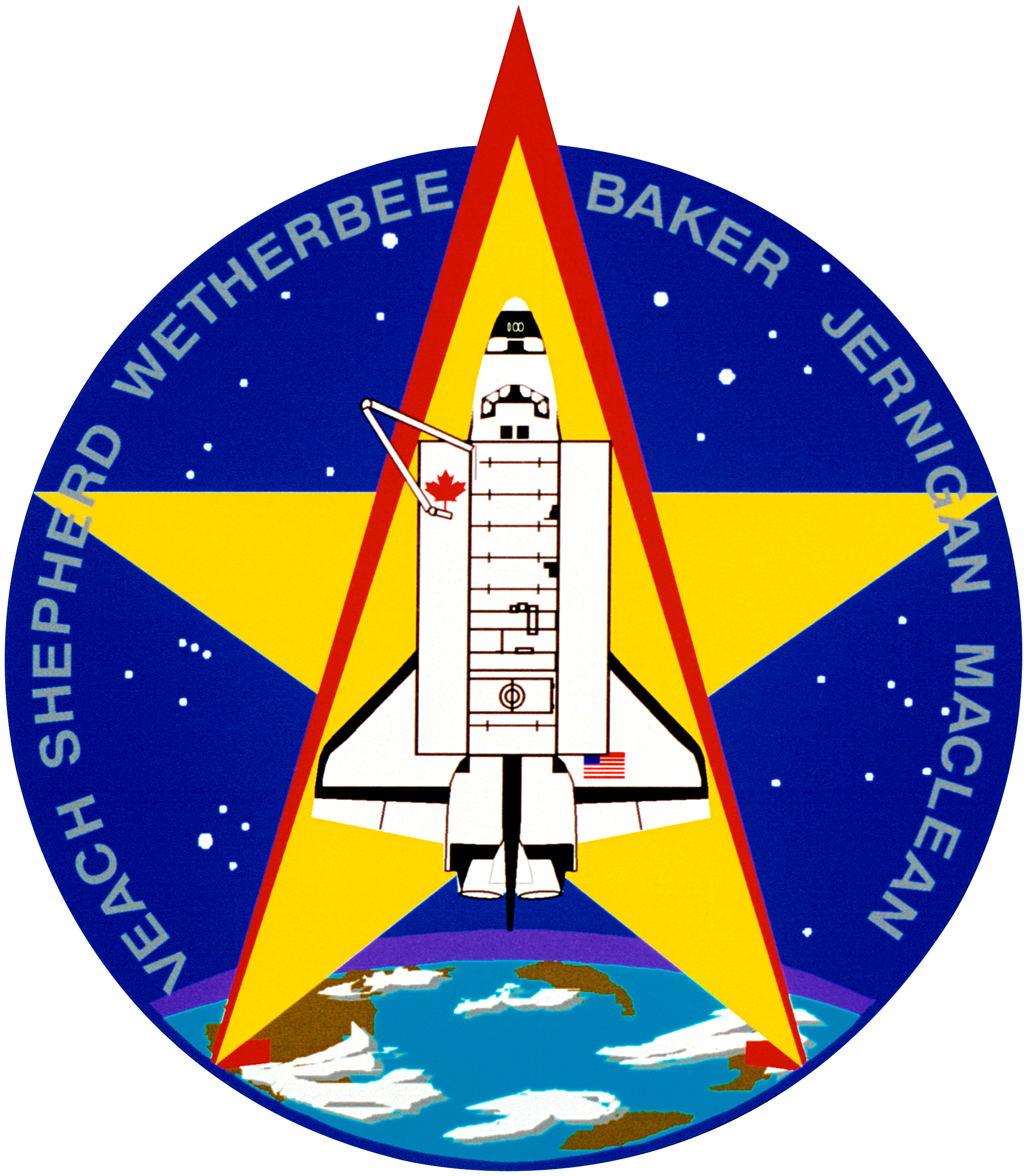
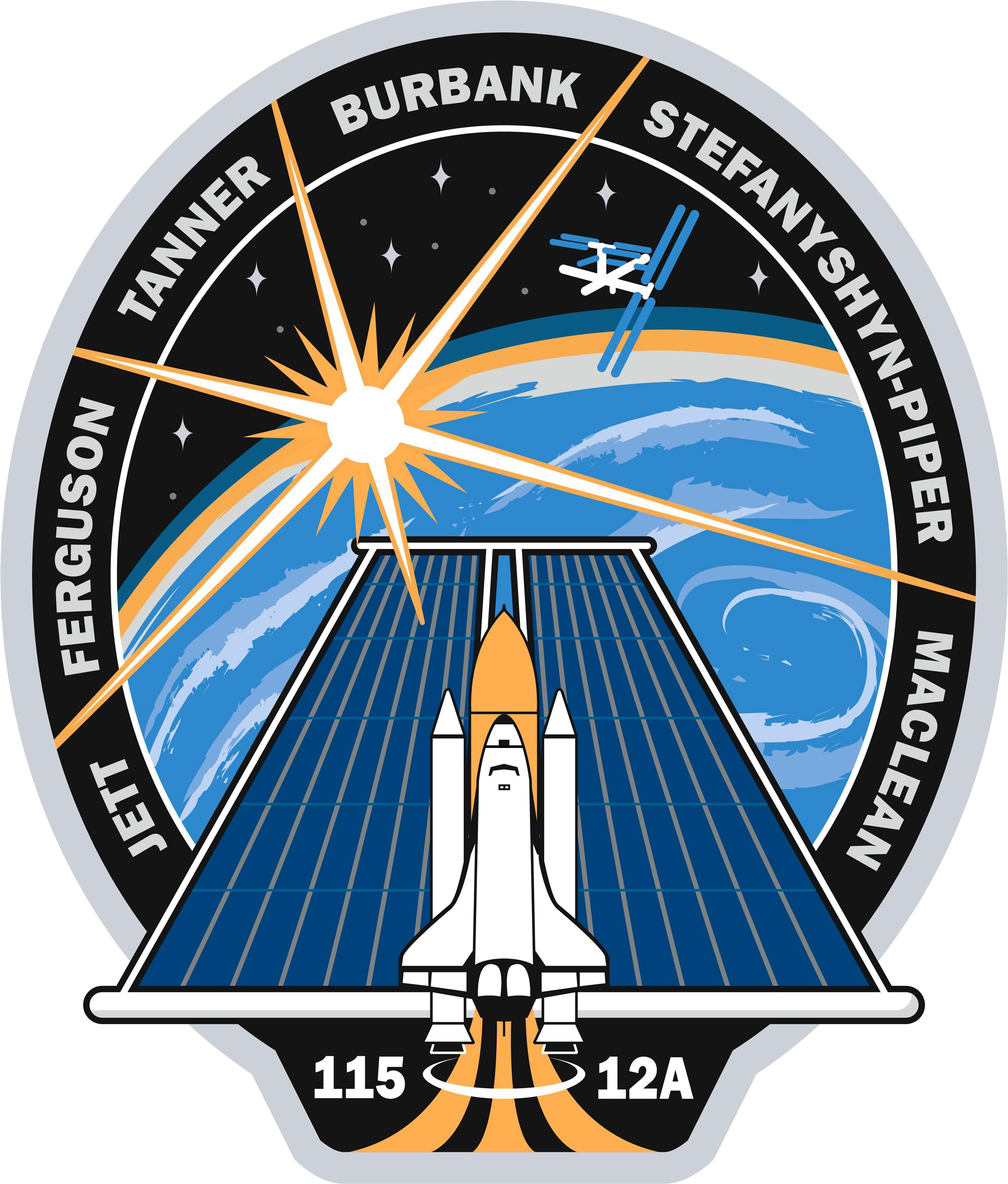
- Mission insignia
- Scientific career
- Fields: Astrophysics
- Thesis: Optical Absorption of O2- Ions in Oxide Lattices (1983)

Steven Glenwood MacLean FRCGS (born December 14, 1954) is a retired Canadian astronaut. He was the president of the Canadian Space Agency, from September 1, 2008, to February 1, 2013.

He was born in Ottawa, Ontario, and is married to Nadine Wielgopolski of Hull, Quebec. They have three children. He enjoys hiking, canoeing, flying, parachuting and gymnastics. In 2013 he returned to physics research as an associate member of the Institute for Quantum Computing (IQC) at the University of Waterloo.

== Personal life ==
MacLean attended Merivale High School in Nepean, Ontario. He received a Bachelor of Science degree in physics in 1977 and a doctorate in physics in 1983 from York University in Toronto. In 1977, he received the President's Award at York University (Murray G. Ross Award). He is a recipient of a Natural Sciences and Engineering Research Council post graduate scholarship in 1980, two Ontario graduate scholarships, one in 1981 and the other in 1982, and a Natural Sciences and Engineering Research Council postdoctoral fellowship in 1983.

He is an honorary fellow of Norman Bethune College at York University and president of the board of directors for the Mont Megantic Observatory project.

From 1974 to 1976, MacLean worked in sports administration and public relations at York University. From 1976 to 1977, he was a member of the Canadian National Gymnastics Team. He taught part-time at York University from 1980 to 1983. In 1983, he became a visiting scholar at Stanford University under Nobel Prize laureate Arthur Leonard Schawlow. He is a laser-physicist, and his research has included work on electro-optics, laser-induced fluorescence of particles and crystals and multi-photon laser spectroscopy.

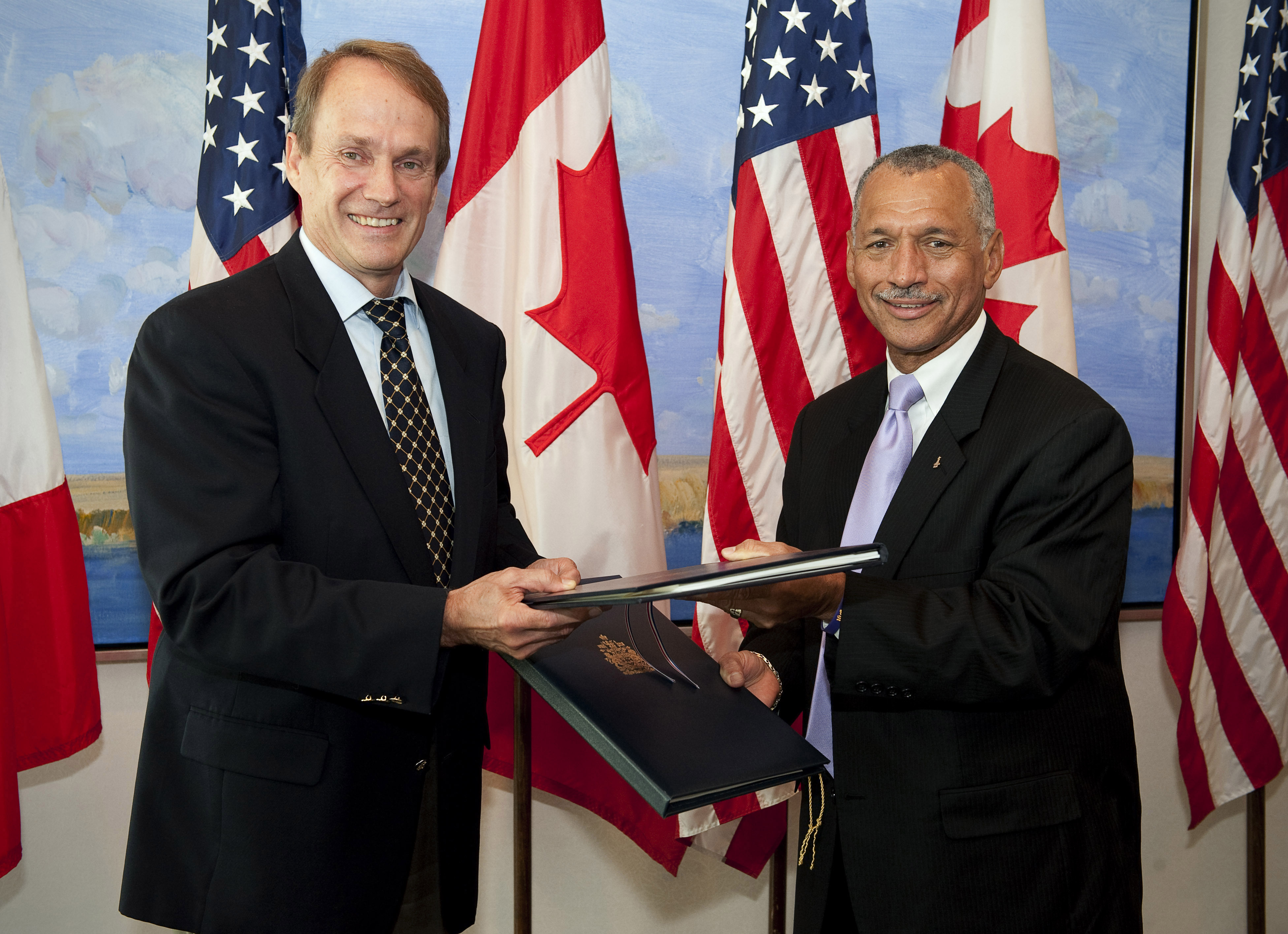
MacLean (left) with NASA Administrator Charles Bolden.

From October 22 to November 1, 1992, MacLean flew onboard Space Shuttle Columbia as a payload specialist for Mission STS-52. During this mission, he performed a set of seven experiments known as CANEX-2, which included an evaluation of the Space Vision System.

MacLean served as a mission specialist on STS-115, which launched on September 9, 2006, and returned on September 21, 2006. He became the first Canadian to operate the robotic arm Canadarm2. On September 13, he performed his first spacewalk, a 7-hour EVA to activate the solar panels on the P3/4 truss – the second Canadian to do so, after Chris Hadfield.

== Honours ==
In 1994, he received honorary doctorates from the Collège militaire royal de Saint-Jean, York University, and Acadia University in Wolfville, Nova Scotia. In September 2006, Steve MacLean Public School was opened in Ottawa, named after him. In 2010 he visited the school on the occasion of the principal's retirement. MacLean was chosen as one of Canada's first six astronauts in December 1983. He began training in February 1984. From 1987 to 1993, MacLean worked as a program manager for CSVS. MacLean was the chief science advisor for the International Space Station from 1993 to 1994. He was also program manager for the Advanced Space Vision System in 1987 to 1993. MacLean is an honorary Fellow of the Royal Canadian Geographical Society.
