= Dafydd Williams =

Canadian astronaut, physician and public speaker (born 1954)

Dafydd Williams OC OOnt FCFPC FRCPC FRCP FRCGS
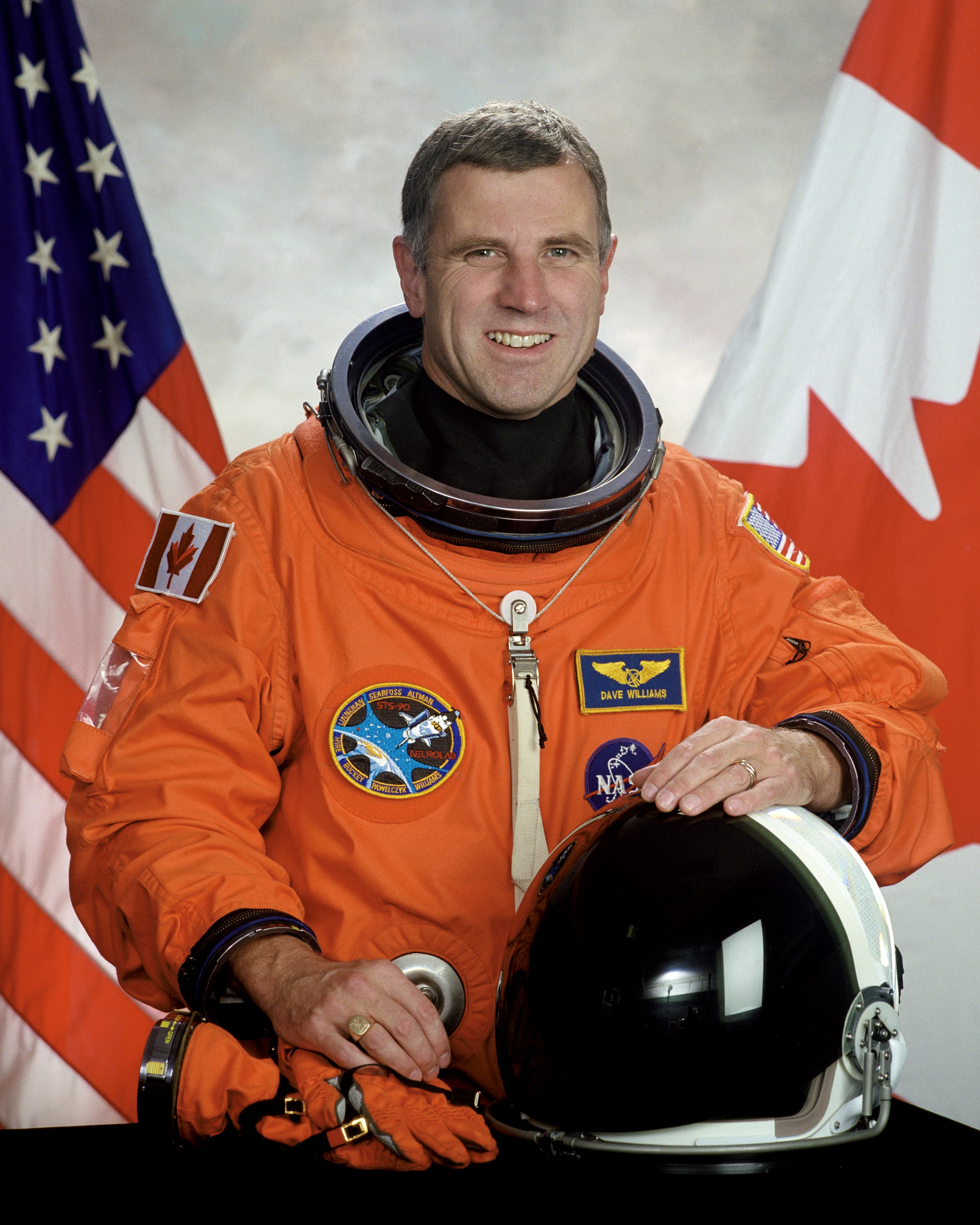
- Official portrait, 2006
- Born: Dafydd Rhys Williams; May 16, 1954 (age 72); Saskatoon, Saskatchewan, Canada
- Education: McGill University (BSc, MSc, MD, ChM)
- Spouse: Cathy Fraser
- Children: 3
- Awards: Royal Canadian Geographical Society Gold Medal (2017); Order of Ontario (2015); Order of Canada (2013); Diamond Jubilee Medal (2012); Canadian Aviation Hall of Fame (2012); NASA Exceptional Service Medal (2008); NASA Outstanding Leadership Medal (2002)
- Space career

CSA astronaut
- Time in space: 28 days, 15 hours, 47 minutes
- Selection: 1992 CSA Group; NASA Group 15 (1994)
- Total EVAs: 3
- Total EVA time: 17 hours, 47 minutes
- Missions: STS-90; STS-118
- Mission insignia
- Website: astrodavemd.ca

Dafydd "Dave" Rhys Williams (born May 16, 1954) is a Canadian physician, public speaker, CEO, author and retired CSA astronaut. Williams was a mission specialist on two Space Shuttle missions. His first spaceflight, STS-90 in 1998, was a 16-day mission aboard Space Shuttle Columbia dedicated to neuroscience research. His second flight, STS-118 in August 2007, was flown by Space Shuttle Endeavour to the International Space Station. During that mission he performed three spacewalks, becoming the third Canadian to perform a spacewalk and setting a Canadian record for total number of spacewalks. These spacewalks combined for a total duration of 17 hours and 47 minutes.

In 1998, Williams became the first non-American to hold a senior management position within NASA, when he held the position of Director of the Space and Life Sciences Directorate at the Johnson Space Center and Deputy Associate Administrator of the Office of Spaceflight at NASA Headquarters.

== Education ==
Williams earned a Bachelor of Science in biology from McGill University in 1976, a Master of Science in physiology, and a Doctor of Medicine and Master of Surgery from McGill University in 1983. He completed a residency in family medicine at the University of Ottawa in 1985 and obtained fellowship in emergency medicine from the Royal College of Physicians and Surgeons of Canada, following completion of a residency in emergency medicine at the University of Toronto in 1988.

== Medical career ==
Williams received postgraduate training in advanced invertebrate physiology at the Friday Harbor Laboratories of the University of Washington. Subsequently, his interests switched to vertebrate neurophysiology when, for his master's thesis, he became involved in basic science research on the role of adrenal steroid hormones in modifying the activity of regions within the central nervous system involved in the regulation of sleep-wake cycles. While working in the Neurophysiological Laboratories at the Allan Memorial Institute for Psychiatry, he assisted in clinical studies of slow wave potentials within the central nervous system.

His clinical research in emergency medicine has included studies evaluating the initial training and skill retention of cardiopulmonary resuscitation skills, patient survival from out-of-hospital cardiac arrest, the early identification of trauma patients at high risk, and the efficacy of tetanus immunization in the elderly.

In 1988, he became an emergency physician with the department of emergency services at Sunnybrook Health Science Centre as well as a lecturer with the Department of Surgery at the University of Toronto. He served as a member of the Air Ambulance Utilization Committee with the Ontario Ministry of Health both as an academic emergency physician and later as a representative of community emergency physicians. In addition, he has trained ambulance attendants, paramedics, nurses, residents, and practicing physicians in cardiac and trauma resuscitation as a course director in Advanced Cardiac Life Support (ACLS) with the Heart and Stroke Foundation of Canada and in Advanced Trauma Life Support (ATLS) with the American College of Surgeons.

From 1989 to 1990, he served as an emergency physician with the Emergency Associates of Kitchener-Waterloo and as medical director of the Westmount Urgent Care Clinic. In 1990, he returned to Sunnybrook as medical director of the ACLS program and coordinator of postgraduate training in emergency medicine. Subsequently, he became the Director of the Department of Emergency Services at Sunnybrook Health Science Centre, Assistant Professor of Surgery, University of Toronto, and assistant professor of medicine, University of Toronto. He remains active in life science and space medicine research, both as a Principal Investigator and as a Co-Investigator.

In April 2008, Williams was recruited by McMaster University as a physician-scientist where he was the director for the new McMaster Centre for Medical Robotics at St. Joseph's Healthcare Hamilton.

On May 18, 2011, Williams became the new president and CEO of Southlake Regional Health Centre, the regional hospital in Newmarket, Ontario, to lead the facility into becoming a full-fledged teaching and research centre. He continued in this role until October 2017 when he left Southlake to work as a healthcare and aerospace consultant.

== Astronaut career ==
Williams was selected by the Canadian Space Agency in June 1992. He completed basic training, and in May 1993 was appointed manager of the Missions and Space Medicine Group within the astronaut program. His collateral duty assignments have included supervising the implementation of operational space medicine activities within the astronaut program and the coordination of the Canadian Astronaut Program Space Unit Life Simulation (CAPSULS) Project. In February 1994 he participated in a 7-day space mission simulation. During this CAPSULS Project he was the Principal Investigator of a study to evaluate the initial training and retention of resuscitation skills by non-medical astronauts. He was also assigned as one of the crew members and acted as the crew medical officer. He announced his retirement as an astronaut on February 29, 2008, effective from March 1, 2008.

=== NASA experience ===
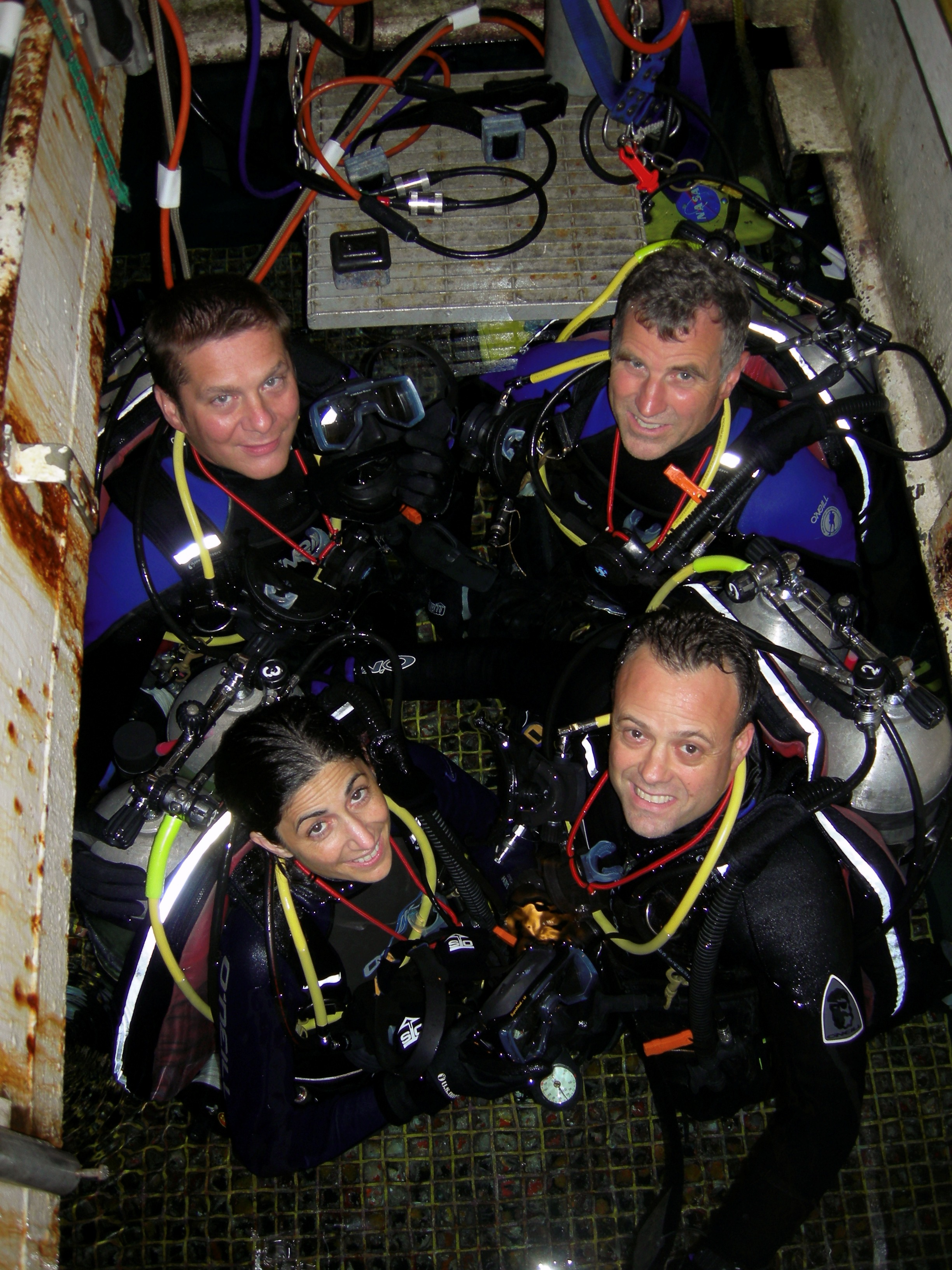
The NEEMO 9 Crew: Left to right (rear): Dr. Tim Broderick, Williams; front: Nicole Stott, Ron Garan.

In January 1995, Williams was selected to join the 1995 international class of NASA mission specialist astronaut candidates. He reported to the Johnson Space Center in March 1995 and completed training and evaluation in May 1996. On completing basic training, he was assigned to work technical issues for the payloads/habitability branch of the astronaut office.

From July 1998 to November 2002, Williams served as Director of the Space and Life Sciences directorate with responsibility for research in both physical and biomedical space sciences at the Johnson Space Center (JSC). With this appointment, he became the first non-American to hold a senior management position within NASA.

Overall crew medical safety was one of his principal concerns, in addition to flight medical operations and JSC occupational and environmental health. His programs were directed toward protecting astronauts from the hazards of the space environment, including space radiation and microgravity, in addition to maintaining their medical, physical, and psychological well-being while aloft and on return to Earth. His other oversight responsibilities were in the fields of telemedicine, 3-D tissue culture/regeneration in microgravity, the curatorial management of extraterrestrial materials, and of qualifying humans for very long space journeys and ensuring their safe return to Earth.

Williams served as an aquanaut on the first NEEMO (NASA Extreme Environment Mission Operations) crew aboard the Aquarius underwater laboratory in October 2001. During this mission, he was thrilled to shake hands underwater with Canadian underwater explorer Joe MacInnis. Williams was originally scheduled to command NEEMO 7 in October 20, but was replaced by back-up crewmember and fellow CSA astronaut Robert Thirsk due to Williams undergoing review of a temporary medical issue. In April 2006, Williams commanded the NEEMO 9 mission. During this eighteen-day mission, the six-person crew developed lunar surface exploration procedures and telemedical technology applications.

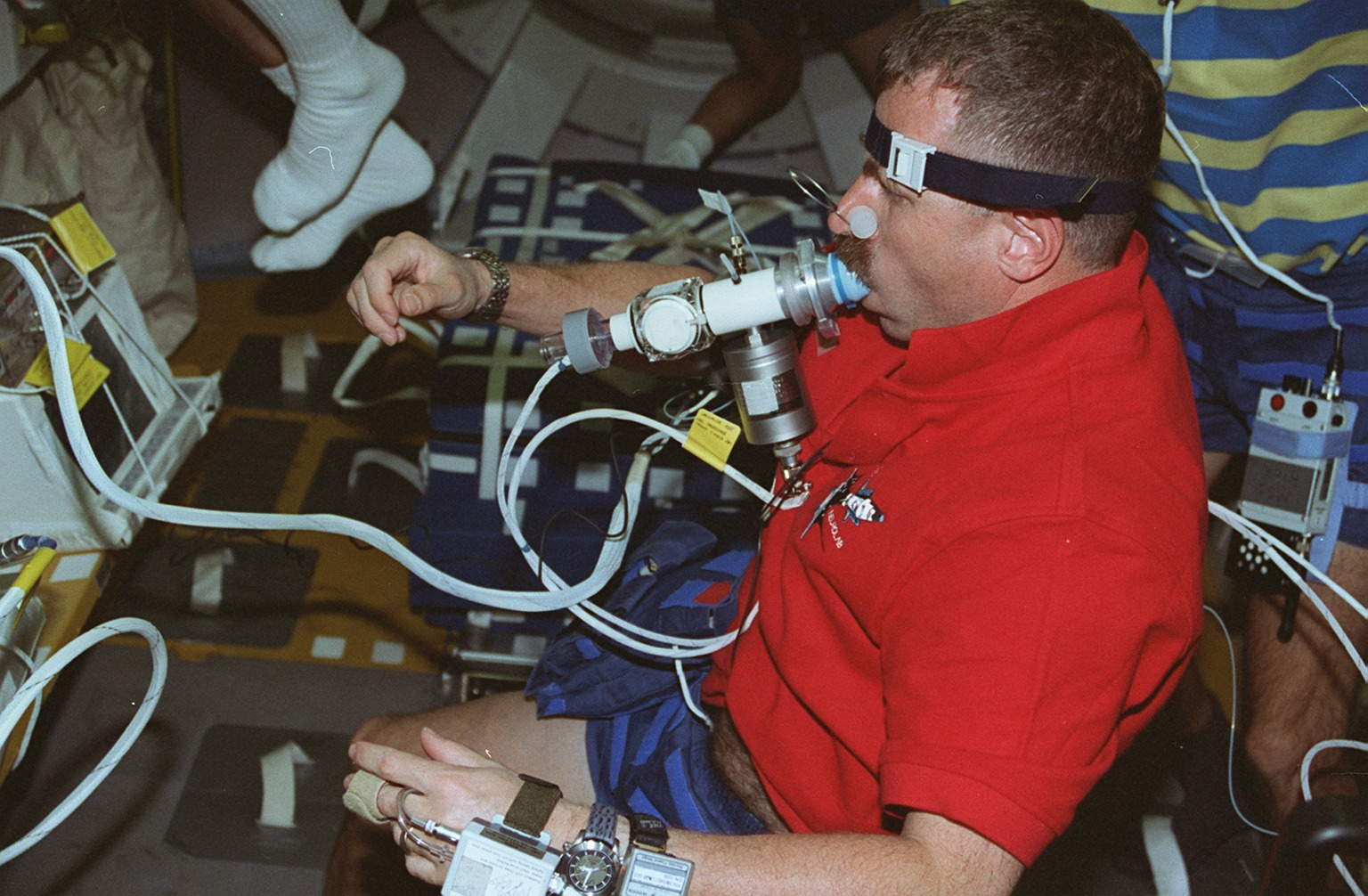
Williams undergoing a pulmonary function test during the Neurolab mission

=== STS-90 ===
Williams was on a mission specialist 3 on STS-90 Neurolab (April 17 to May 3, 1998). During the 16-day Spacelab flight, the seven-person crew aboard Space Shuttle Columbia served as both experiment subjects and operators for 26 individual life science experiments focusing on the effects of microgravity on the brain and nervous system. The STS-90 flight orbited the Earth 256 times, covered 6.3 million miles, and logged Williams over 381 hours in space.

=== STS-118 ===
Williams was assigned to the crew of STS-118 (August 8 to 21, 2007), an assembly mission to the International Space Station. He completed three spacewalks during this mission, and set two new records during his final EVA on Saturday, August 18: he is the Canadian with the most spacewalks (3) and Williams ended Saturday's EVA with a total duration of 17 hours, 47 minutes of extravehicular time. He was the second Canadian to lead an EVA and is one of four Canadian astronauts who have performed EVAs.

== Awards and honours ==
Williams is a member of the College of Physicians and Surgeons of Ontario, the Ontario Medical Association, the College of Family Physicians of Canada, the Royal College of Physicians and Surgeons of Canada, the Canadian Association of Emergency Physicians, the Aerospace Medical Association, the Canadian Society for Aerospace Medicine, and the Canadian Aeronautics and Space Institute. Past affiliations include the Society for Neuroscience, the New York Academy of Science, and the Montreal Physiological Society.

Williams was awarded the Commonwealth Certificate of Thanks in 1973 and the Commonwealth Recognition Award (1975) for his contribution to the Royal Life Saving Society of Canada. Academic awards include the A.S. Hill Bursary, McGill University, in 1980; the Walter Hoare Bursary, McGill University, in 1981; and the J.W. McConnell Award, McGill University, from 1981 to 1983. He was named Faculty Scholar in 1982 and University Scholar in 1983 by the faculty of medicine at McGill University. In 1983, he also received the psychiatry prize and the Wood Gold Medal for clinical excellence from the Faculty of Medicine and was named on the dean's honor list by the physiology department, at McGill University, for his postgraduate research. He was twice awarded the second prize for his participation in the University of Toronto Emergency Medicine Research Papers Program, in 1986, and 1988, and received top honours in that competition in 1987.

Following STS-90, in 1999, he received the Melbourne W. Boynton Award from the American Astronautical Society and the Bronze Medal from the Spanish Council for Scientific Research (CSIC). In 2000, he received the Individual Achievement Award from the Rotary National Award for Space Achievement and was made a patron of the International Life Saving Society in 2002. He was recognized with the NASA Outstanding Leadership Medal in 2002, a JSC Space and Life Sciences Directorate Special Professional Achievement Award, and in 2004, a NASA Astronaut Office GEM Award and Langley Research Center Superior Accomplishment Award. With the crew of STS-118, in 2008, he received the Federation Aeronautique Internationale Medaille de la Vaulx Award and the V.M. Komarov Diploma followed by a NASA Exceptional Service Medal.

In 2012, Williams was inducted into the Canada's Aviation Hall of Fame. He received Queen Elizabeth II, Diamond Jubilee Medal, later that year and the following year Williams was made an Officer of the Order of Canada in 2013 for his work in space exploration. He received the Order of Ontario in 2015 and the Award of Excellence from the College of Family Physicians of Canada later that year.

Dr. David R. Williams Public School was selected as the name for a new elementary school in Oakville, Ontario, where Williams lived, in 2020.

== Honorary degrees ==
Williams has received the following honorary degrees; Honorary Doctorate of Laws, University of Saskatchewan (2004), Honorary Doctorate of Science, McGill University (2007), Honorary Doctorate of Science, University of Wales (2007), Honorary Doctorate of Science, Queen's University 2009, Honorary Doctorate of Laws, Dalhousie University (2016), Honorary Doctorate of Science, Swansea University (2018), Honorary Doctorate of Science, Carleton University (2022).

== Books ==
- Williams, Dave; In: Foster, Joe (2025). How to Survive and Thrive Volume III. London: One Golden Nugget. ISBN 9781068731884.
- Williams, Dave; Pruessen, Linda (2023). Space on Earth: How Thinking Like an Astronaut Can Help Save the Planet. Toronto: Annick Press. ISBN 9781773217673.
- Williams, Dave; Howell, Elizabeth (2022). Why Am I Taller?: What happens to an Astronaut's Body in Space. Toronto: ECW Press. ISBN 9781770907409.
- Williams, Dave; Howell, Elizabeth (2021). Leadership Moments from NASA: Achieving the Impossible. Toronto: ECW Press. ISBN 9781770416048.
- Williams, Dave (2018). Defying Limits: Lessons From the Edge of the Universe. New York: Simon and Schuster. ISBN 9781501160950.
- Williams, Dave; Cunti, Loredana (2018). Destination: Space Living on Other Planets. Toronto: Annick Press. ISBN 9781773210582.
- Williams, Dave; Cunti, Loredana (2018). Mighty Mission Machines From Rockets to Rovers. Toronto: Annick Press. ISBN 9781773210131.
- Williams, Dave; Cunti, Loredana (2017). Go for Liftoff! How to Train Like an Astronaut. Toronto: Annick Press. ISBN 9781554519156.
- Williams, Dave; Cunti, Loredana (2016). To Burp or Not to Burp: A Guide to Your Body in Space. Toronto: Annick Press. ISBN 9781554518548.

== Personal life ==
Williams was born in Saskatoon, Saskatchewan, and is married to Cathy Fraser of Pointe-Claire, Quebec. They have two children. He enjoys flying, scuba diving, hiking, sailing, kayaking, canoeing, downhill and cross-country skiing. He is of Welsh descent through his late father, Bill who was born in Bargoed.
