= Comparative Biochemistry and Physiology B =

Comparative Biochemistry and Physiology B: Biochemistry and Molecular Biology
- Discipline: Biochemistry
- Language: English
- Edited by: Chris N. Glover

Publication details
- History: 1960-present
- Publisher: Elsevier
- Frequency: Monthly
- Impact factor: 2.069 (2012)

Standard abbreviations
- ISO 4: Comp. Biochem. Physiol. B

Indexing
- CODEN: CBPBB8
- ISSN: 1096-4959
- LCCN: 2005222112
- OCLC no.: 647936211

Links
- Journal homepage; Online access

Comparative Biochemistry and Physiology Part B: Biochemistry & Molecular Biology is a peer-reviewed scientific journal that covers research in biochemistry, physiology, and molecular biology.
