= Timothy J. Broderick =

American surgeon and academic

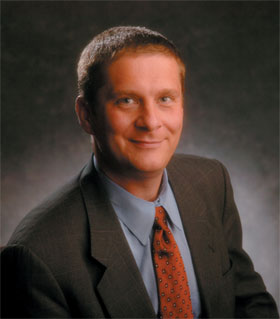
- Born: Timothy John Broderick; July 14, 1964 (age 61); Ohio, U.S.
- Education: BS, Xavier University; MD, University of Cincinnati College of Medicine
- Occupations: Surgeon, professor
- Employer: University of Cincinnati
- Known for: Aquanaut

Timothy J. Broderick, FACS, is Professor of Surgery and Biomedical Engineering at the University of Cincinnati, where he has been on the faculty since 2003. He also is Chief of the Division of Gastrointestinal and Endocrine Surgery and is Director of the Advanced Center for Telemedicine and Surgical Innovation (ACTSI). He has flown on the NASA KC-135 parabolic laboratory ("vomit comet") and dived in the NASA Extreme Environment Mission Operations (NEEMO) program to develop advanced surgical technologies for long duration space flight.

== Career ==
Broderick has spearheaded efforts in the area of advanced laparoscopic, robotic and telerobotic surgery. He has worked within the National Aeronautics and Space Administration's (NASA) Medical Informatics and Technology Applications Consortium, the Defense Advanced Research Projects Agency (DARPA) Trauma Pod Program, the U.S. Army Telemedicine & Advanced Technology Research Center (TATRC), and the National Space Biomedical Research Institute (NSBRI) External Advisory Council. He provides consultation to many companies including Ethicon Endo-Surgery and General Dynamics Robotic Systems. He is a peer-reviewed Department of Defense and NASA funded researcher primarily focused on the development and application of advanced technology in surgery. His ongoing research programs include simulation, informatics, telemedicine, robotic surgery and robotic telesurgery. Broderick is the Program Manager for DARPA's Microsystems Technology Office (MTO).

== Education ==
Broderick is a graduate of Xavier University in Cincinnati, where he received a B.S. degree cum laude in Chemistry and Computer Science in 1986. He attended the University of Cincinnati College of Medicine, receiving his medical degree in 1990. Following residency and research fellowship at the Medical College of Virginia at Virginia Commonwealth University (MCV/VCU), Broderick was on the faculty at MCV/VCU in Richmond, Virginia, until returning to Cincinnati.

== Honors and memberships ==
Broderick's honors include election to Alpha Omega Alpha, the David M. Hume Research Award from the Humera Surgical Society, the Young Investigator Award from SmithKline Beecham, the 2004 Space Medicine Branch Young Investigator Award Finalist (Aerospace Medical Association), and the Best Technology award from the 2006 World Congress of Endoscopic Surgery/European Association of Endoscopy Surgery. He is a member of over a dozen professional societies including the American College of Surgeons, Association for Academic Surgery, Society of University Surgeons, Aerospace Medical Association, American Telemedicine Association, American Medical Informatics Association, American Association for the Advancement of Science, Society of American Gastrointestinal Endoscopic Surgeons, Society of Laparoendoscopic Surgeons, the Society for Surgery of the Alimentary Tract, the Undersea and Hyperbaric Medical Society, and the Explorers Club. He is also a member of the Medical Advisory Board for the National Center for Space Biological Technologies (NCSBT) at Stanford University.

Broderick has published over 40 articles and made over 50 presentations at local, national and international meetings. He was awarded extramural funding by SmithKline Beecham, the American Heart Association, NASA and the Department of Defense. The U.S. Army TATRC has supported his research "NASA Extreme Environment Mission Operations 12", "Robotic Surgery in Flight", and "High Altitude Platforms Mobile Robotic Telesurgery". Broderick is a reviewer for Telemedicine and e-Health Journal; the journal Aviation, Space, and Environmental Medicine; U.S. Army TATRC; and the U.S. Department of Homeland Security.

== Aquanaut ==
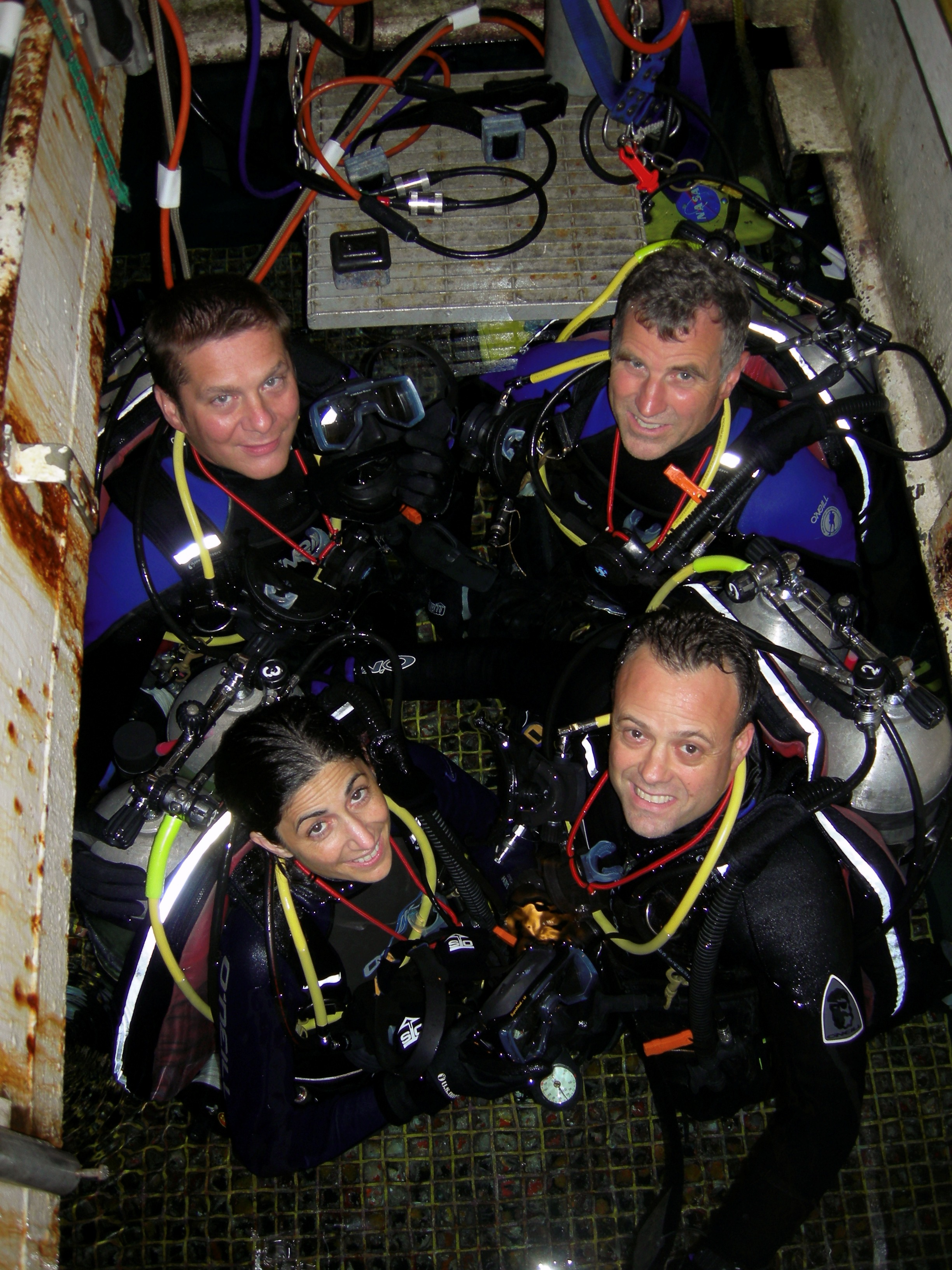
The NEEMO 9 Crew: Left to right (rear): Broderick, Dafydd Williams; front: Nicole P. Stott, Ron Garan.

In April 2006, Broderick became an aquanaut through his participation in the joint NASA-NOAA, NEEMO 9 (NASA Extreme Environment Mission Operations) project, an exploration research mission held in Aquarius, the world's only undersea research laboratory. During this eighteen-day mission, the six-person crew of NEEMO 9 developed lunar surface exploration procedures and telemedical technology applications in support of the United States' Vision for Space Exploration. Broderick was an aquanaut again on the NEEMO 12 mission in May 2007.

Broderick plays a major role in the education of faculty, residents, medical students, and community physicians in advanced laparoscopic and robotic procedures. He continues to use his skills as clinician, educator, computer scientist, and technologist to foster major advances in the art and science of surgery.

== Personal ==
Broderick is the son of Joseph Dilger Broderick and Marilyn Ann (Fischer) Broderick. On October 5, 1996, he married Kara Lynn Jones in Richmond, Virginia.
