= Great Lakes Forestry Centre =

Agency overview
- Headquarters: 1219 Queen Street East; Sault Ste. Marie, Ontario; P6A 2E5
- Website: Great Lakes Forestry Centre

The Great Lakes Forestry Centre is a federal forestry research institute in Sault Ste. Marie, Ontario, Canada.
