= James Talacek =

American professional aquanaut

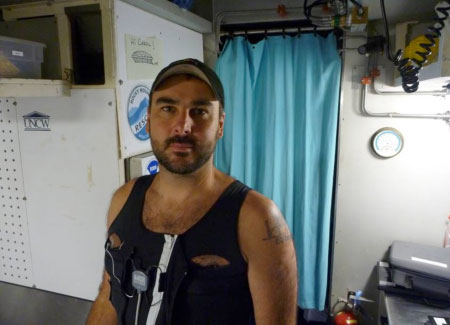
- Talacek inside Aquarius during the NEEMO 14 mission.
- Born: 1970 (age 55–56)
- Education: University of North Carolina Wilmington
- Occupations: Commercial diver, aquanaut

James Raymond Talacek is an American professional aquanaut with the University of North Carolina Wilmington (UNCW). He serves as Oceanographic Field Operations Manager at Aquarius Reef Base, the world's only undersea research laboratory.

== Early life and education ==
Talacek grew up in Clayton, North Carolina. He earned his first diving certification while attending UNCW. Talacek subsequently worked in construction. In 1993 he was hired as an underwater bridge inspector by the North Carolina Department of Transportation (NC DOT) Underwater Unit, gaining experience in underwater construction and surface-supplied diving. While employed by NC DOT, Talacek earned his Commercial Diving Supervisor certification. He also earned a United States Coast Guard Captain's license and Divemaster certification. Talacek began running dive charters on weekends from Carolina Beach. During his last six months working for NC DOT, Talacek served as diving supervisor for a dive team stationed at the Outer Banks.

== Aquarius ==
Talacek serves as Oceanographic Field Operations Manager at Aquarius Reef Base for the National Undersea Research Center (NURC). In this position he serves as diving supervisor, Aquarius lead habitat technician, boat captain and Divemaster. Talacek is a certified trimix diver, emergency medical technician (EMT) and advanced diver medic (DMT-A). During his first ten-day saturation diving mission aboard Aquarius in July 2001, Talacek commented, "It's really special to see things that only a small group of people ever get to see. I now understand why everyone on our crew is so anxious to work these saturation missions, because I too am loving every minute!"

As a habitat technician during Aquarius missions, Talacek's responsibilities include habitat operations and maintenance, including carrying out dives to maintain the exterior of the habitat. He also monitors life support systems, communicates with the crew on shore, and acts as a divemaster for the scientists aboard Aquarius.

Missions aboard Aquarius in which Talacek has participated have included a 2001 mission researching mantis shrimp, a September 2007 coral reef research mission called "If Reefs Could Talk", and a June 2006 mission with the U.S. Navy Specialized Research Diving Detachment (SRDD) during which NURC divers investigated the possibility of using rebreathers during excursions from Aquarius. In August 2009, during the investigation of the death of Aquarius aquanaut Dewey Smith, Talacek took part in an underwater test in which he operated the hydraulic hammer in use near Smith at the time of his fatal accident in the vicinity of an Inspiration closed circuit rebreather (CCR) similar to the one Smith had been using. In July 2012 Talacek served as Lead Habitat Technician for "50 Years of Living Beneath the Sea", an expedition commemorating the fiftieth anniversary of Jacques Cousteau's Conshelf I project and co-led by Dr. Sylvia Earle.

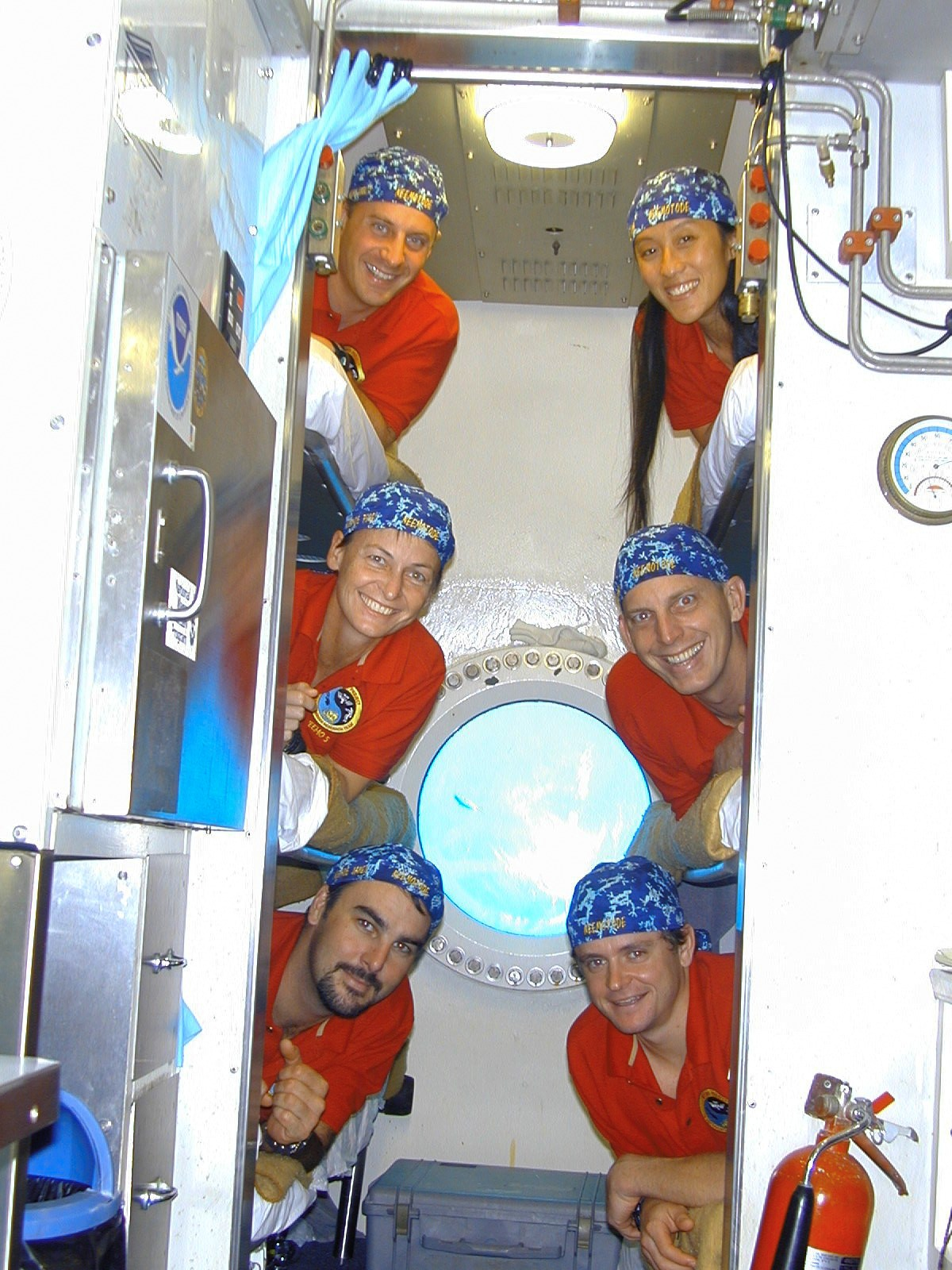
NEEMO 5 crew members are pictured in the bunkroom aboard the Aquarius research habitat. Top, L-R: Garrett Reisman, Emma Hwang; Middle: Peggy Whitson, Clayton Anderson; Bottom: Talacek, Ryan Snow.

Talacek has taken part as a habitat technician in eight of the NASA Extreme Environment Mission Operations (NEEMO) missions, a series of NASA-NOAA missions which use Aquarius as an analog environment for space exploration. Talacek served as a habitat technician during the following missions:

- NEEMO 4: September 23–27, 2002
- NEEMO 5: June 16–29, 2003
- NEEMO 7: October 11–21, 2004
- NEEMO 12: May 7–18, 2007
- NEEMO 14: May 10–23, 2010
- NEEMO 15: October 20–26, 2011
- NEEMO 16: June 11–22, 2012
- NEEMO 18: July 21–29, 2014

In May 2007, Talacek and other NURP/UNCW divers, including fellow Aquarius divers Mark Hulsbeck and Jim Buckley, set up a coral monitoring station pylon offshore from the Discovery Bay Marine Laboratory in Discovery Bay, Jamaica for a cooperative program among Caribbean countries called Mainstreaming Adaptation to Climate Change (MACC). The station was part of NOAA's Integrated Coral Observing Network (ICON). The station was subsequently destroyed during Hurricane Paloma in November 2008.

== Personal life ==
Talacek is an enthusiastic skydiver, having made more than 400 jumps as of 2012. He has also made two BASE jumps, although he once commented that "it's hard to find places where it is legal to jump." Talacek also enjoys spearfishing, mudding, boating, riding motorcycles and inline skating. He married his wife, Holly, in 2012.
