= Peggy Whitson =

American astronaut and biochemistry researcher (born 1960)

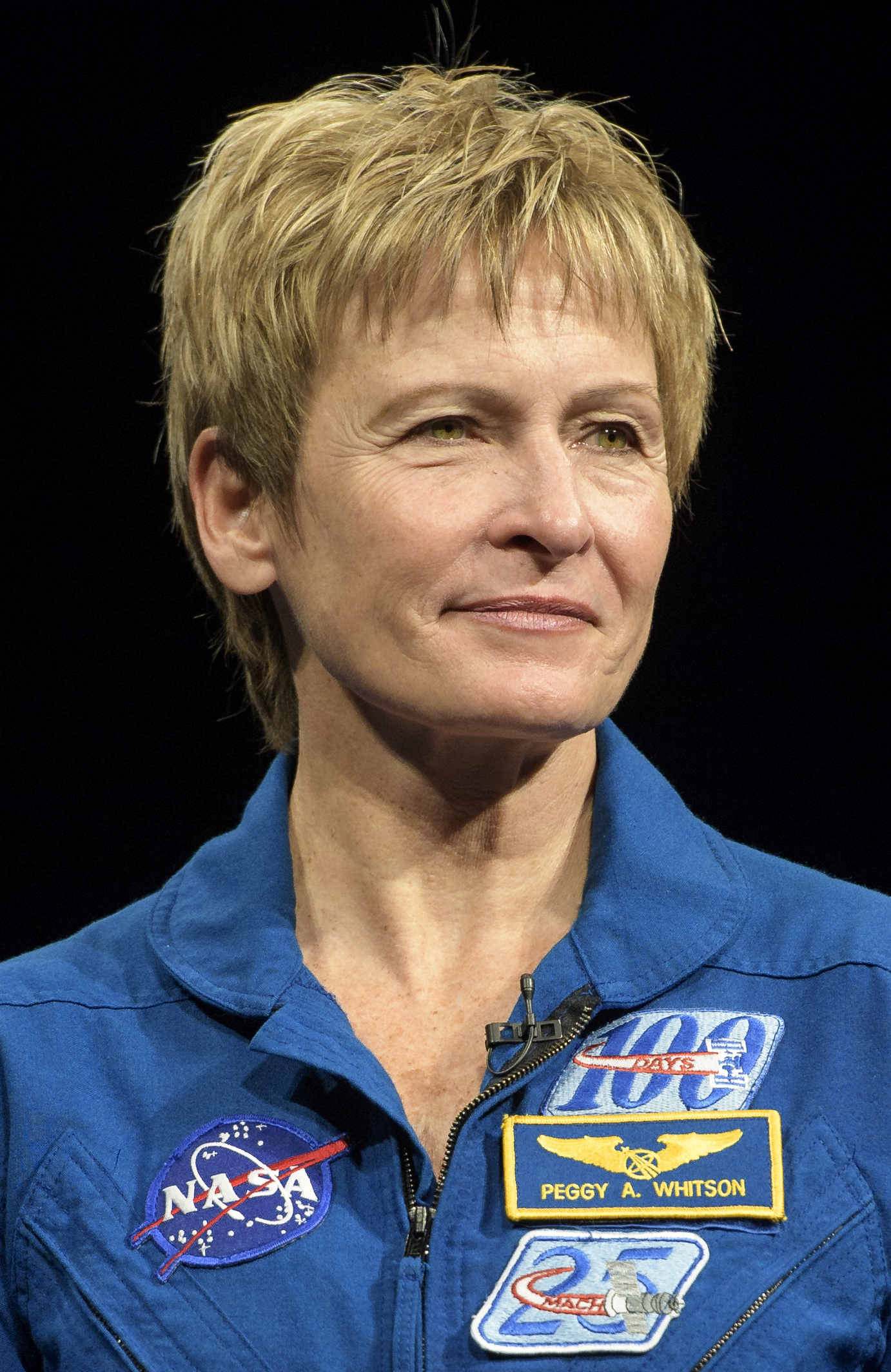
- Whitson at the National Air and Space Museum in 2018
- Born: February 9, 1960 (age 66); Beaconsfield, Iowa, U.S.
- Education: Iowa Wesleyan University (BS); Rice University (PhD)
- Space career

NASA astronaut
- Time in space: 695 days, 7 hours and 4 minutes
- Selection: NASA Group 16 (1996)
- Total EVAs: 10
- Total EVA time: 60 hours, 21 minutes
- Missions: STS-111/STS-113 (Expedition 5); Soyuz TMA-11 (Expedition 16); Soyuz MS-03/MS-04 (Expedition 50/51/52); Axiom Mission 2; Axiom Mission 4
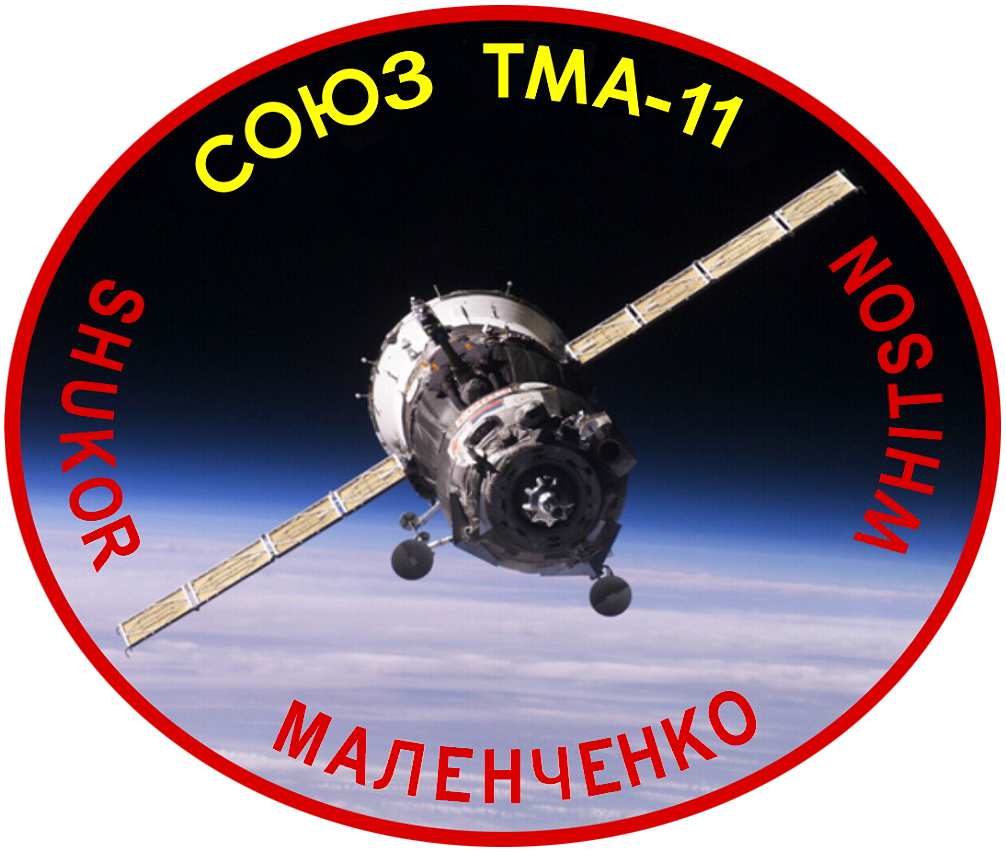
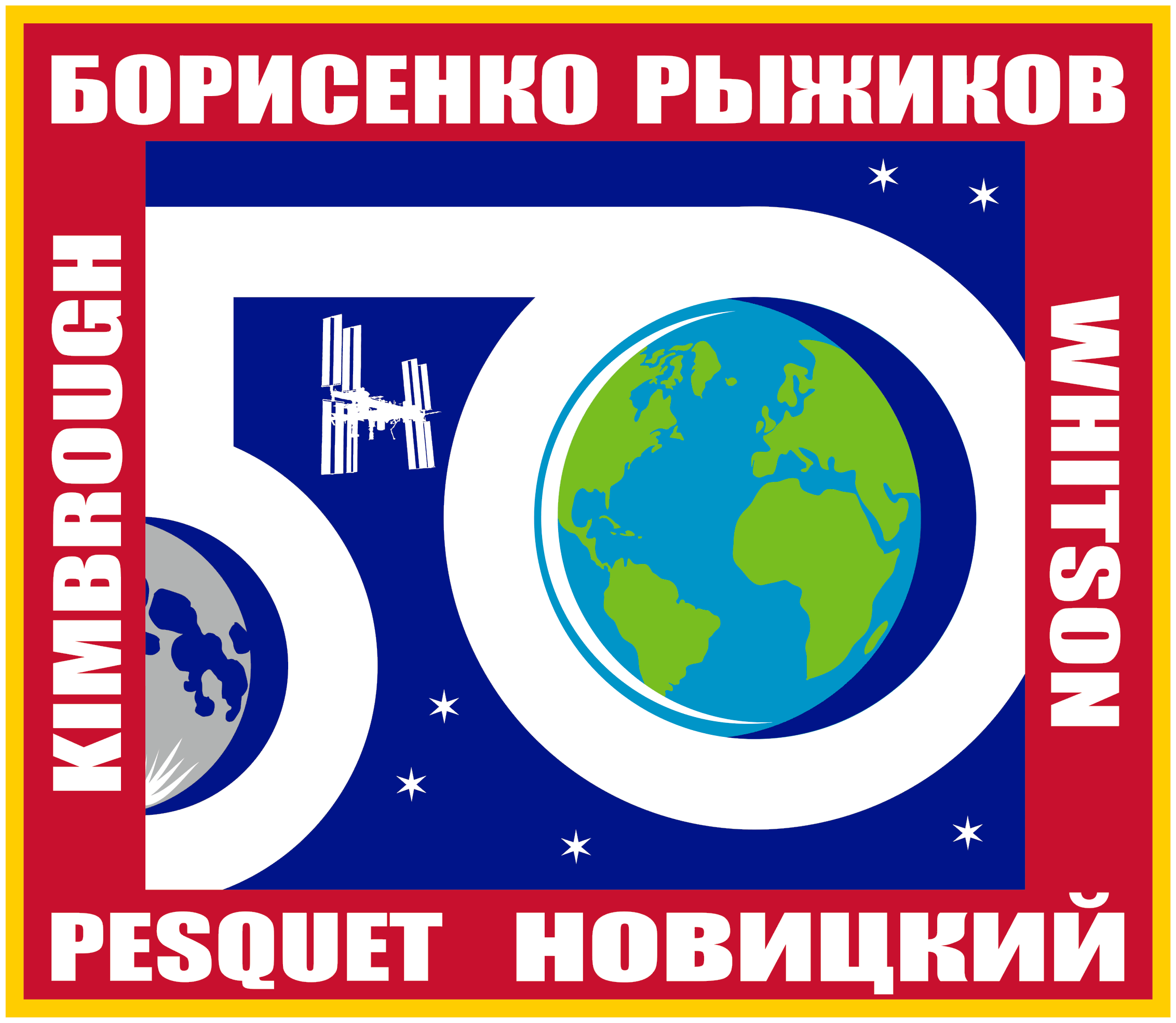
- Mission insignia
- Retired: June 15, 2018 from NASA currently active at Axiom Space
- Scientific career
- Fields: Biochemistry
- Thesis: The Lactose Repressor-Operator DNA Interaction: Chemical and Physical Studies of the Complex (Modification, Equilibrium, Protein, Stopped-Flow, Kinetics) (1986)
- Doctoral advisor: Kathleen Matthews

Peggy Annette Whitson (born February 9, 1960) is an American biochemistry researcher, and astronaut working for Axiom Space. She retired from NASA in 2018, after serving as the 13th chief of the Astronaut Office. Over all her missions, Whitson has accumulated a total of 695 days in space, more than any other American or woman.

Her first NASA space mission was in 2002: an extended stay aboard the International Space Station (ISS) as a crew member of Expedition 5. On her second mission, Expedition 16 in 2007-2008, she became the first woman to command the ISS. In 2009, she became the first woman to serve as NASA's Chief Astronaut, the most senior position in the NASA Astronaut Corps. In 2017, Whitson became the first woman to command the International Space Station twice. Her 289-day flight was the longest single space flight by a woman until Christina Koch's 328-day flight.

Whitson holds the records for the oldest woman spacewalker and the most spacewalks by a woman (10). Whitson's cumulative EVA time is 60 hours, 21 minutes, which places her in seventh place for total EVA time. At age 57 on her final NASA flight, she was the oldest woman ever in space at that time - a record broken in a 2021 sub-orbital flight by Wally Funk. She is still the oldest woman to orbit the Earth, a record she set in 2025, at 65.

On June 15, 2018, Whitson retired from NASA. She later became a consultant for Axiom Space. She served as the commander of Axiom Mission 2 in 2023 and Axiom Mission 4 in 2025.

Whitson was included in Time magazine's 100 Most Influential People of 2018.

== Early life and background ==
Whitson grew up on a farm outside the town of Beaconsfield, Iowa, with her sister, Kathy, her brothers, Brian and Hugh, and her parents, Keith and Beth. Her parents were farmers. She decided to become an astronaut after she watched the first Moon landing on television as a child in 1969. Whitson graduated from Mount Ayr Community High School in 1978 and received a Bachelor of Science degree in biology and chemistry from Iowa Wesleyan College in 1981. She then went on to earn her doctorate degree in biochemistry from Rice University in 1986 under the direction of Kathleen Matthews, then continued at Rice as a Robert A Welch Post-doctoral Fellow until October 1986. She is married to Clarence F. Sams.

== Research career ==
After her fellowship at Rice, she began working at Johnson Space Center in Houston, Texas, as a National Research Council Resident Research Associate. From April 1988 until September 1989, Whitson served as the Supervisor for the Biochemistry Research Group at KRUG International, a medical sciences contractor at NASA-JSC.

From 1991 through 1997, Whitson became an adjunct assistant professor in the Department of Internal Medicine and the Department of Human Biological Chemistry and Genetics at the University of Texas Medical Branch in Galveston, Texas. In 1997, Whitson began teaching as adjunct assistant professor at Rice University in the Maybee Laboratory for Biochemical and Genetic Engineering.

From 1992 to 1995, she served as project scientist for the Shuttle-Mir Program, then until 1996, as deputy division chief for the Medical Sciences division at the Johnson Space Center.

== NASA career ==
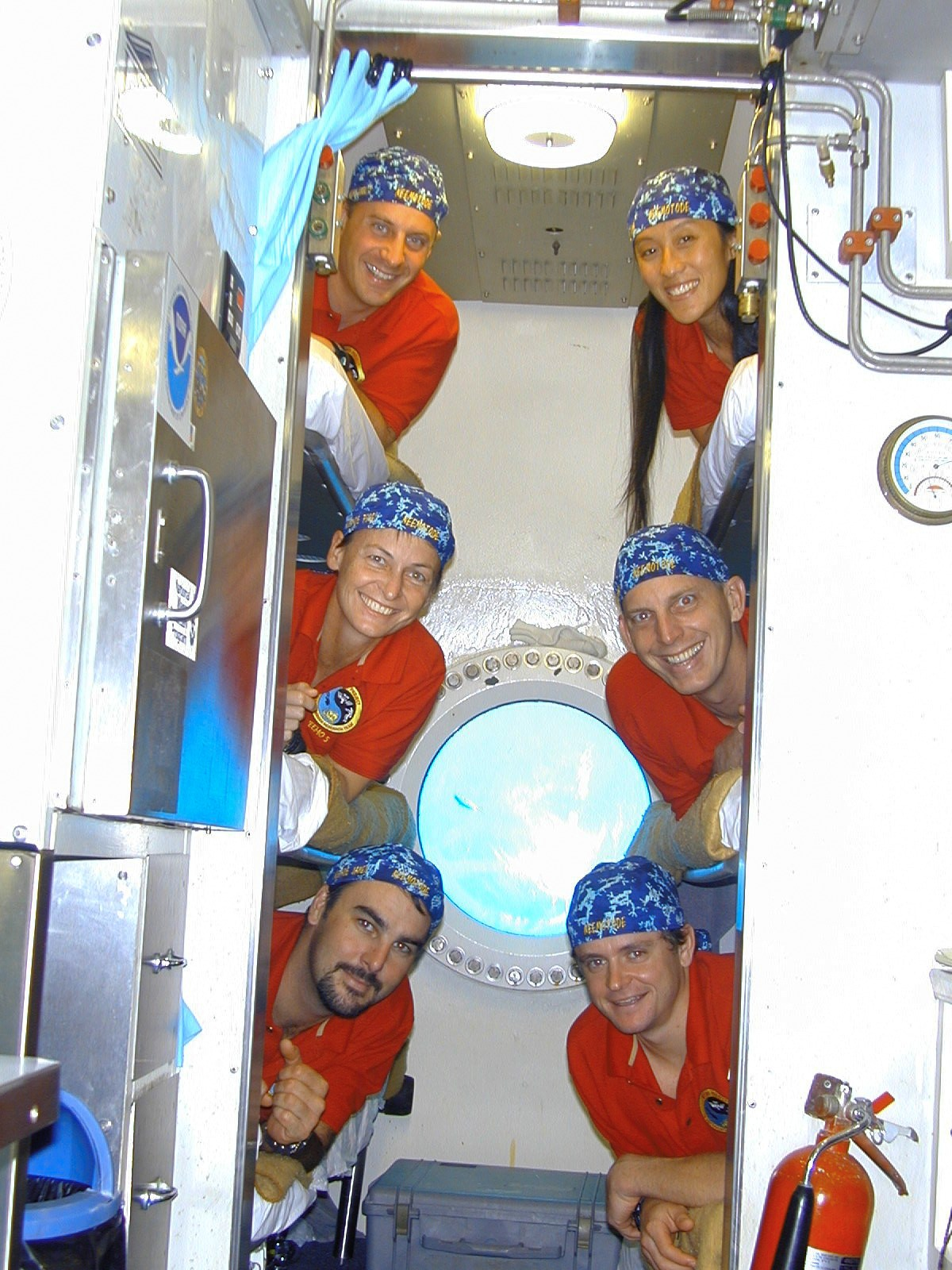
NEEMO 5 crew members are pictured in the bunkroom aboard the Aquarius research habitat. Top, L-R: Garrett Reisman, Emma Hwang; Middle: Whitson, Clayton Anderson; Bottom: James Talacek, Ryan Snow.

From 1989 to 1993, Whitson worked as a research biochemist in the Biomedical Operations and Research Branch at NASA-JSC. From 1991 to 1993, she served as technical monitor of the Biochemistry Research Laboratories in the Biomedical Operations and Research Branch. From 1991 through 1992, she was the payload element developer for Bone Cell Research Experiment (E10) aboard SL-J (STS-47), and was a member of the US-USSR Joint Working Group in Space Medicine and Biology. In 1992, she was named the project scientist of the Shuttle-Mir Program (STS-60, STS-63, STS-71, Mir 18, Mir 19), and served in this capacity until the conclusion of the Phase 1A Program in 1995. From 1993 through 1996, Whitson held the additional responsibilities of the deputy division chief of the Medical Sciences Division at NASA-JSC. From 1995 to 1996, she served as co-chair of the U.S.-Russian Mission Science Working Group.

In April 1996, Whitson was selected as an astronaut candidate; she started training in August 1996. Upon completing the two years of training and evaluation, she was assigned technical duties in the Astronaut Office Operations Planning Branch, and served as the lead for the Crew Test Support Team in Russia from 1998 to 1999. In June 2003, Whitson commanded the NEEMO 5 mission aboard the Aquarius underwater laboratory, living and working underwater for 14 days. From November 2003 to March 2005, she served as deputy chief of the Astronaut Office. From March 2005 to November 2005, she served as chief of the Station Operations Branch, Astronaut Office.

=== Chief of the Astronaut Office ===
Whitson was appointed NASA Chief of the Astronaut Office in October 2009, replacing Steven W. Lindsey. Whitson was the first female, and first non-pilot to serve as Chief Astronaut. She resigned when she went back on active flight status in July 2012, replaced by Robert Behnken. Whitson has also served twice as the commander of the International Space Station.

== Involvement with Axiom Space ==
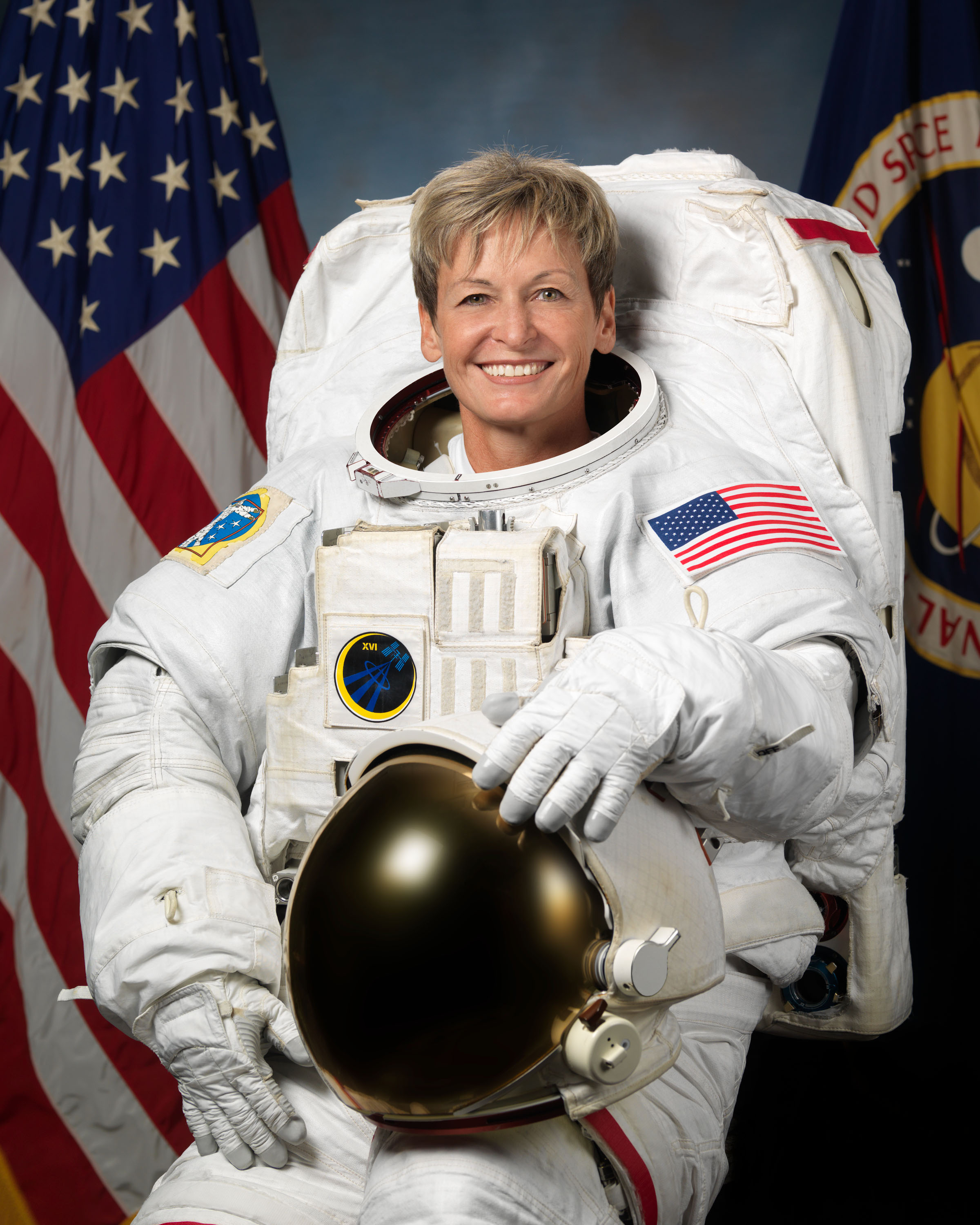
Peggy Whitson in an EMU suit

She became the Director of Human Space Flight for Axiom Space in 2021. In January 2021, Axiom announced she would be back-up commander of Axiom Mission 1, raising the possibility that she could fly a later Axiom Space mission.

On 21 May 2023, Whitson returned to space as the commander of the second Axiom mission Axiom Mission 2, docking with the ISS and spending 8 days in space. She was again back-up commander of Axiom Mission 3.

On 26 June 2025, Whitson served as the commander of the fourth Axiom mission Axiom Mission 4.

She is currently the Senior Vice President of Human Space Flight Training for Axiom Space.

== Spaceflight experience ==
=== Expedition 5 ===
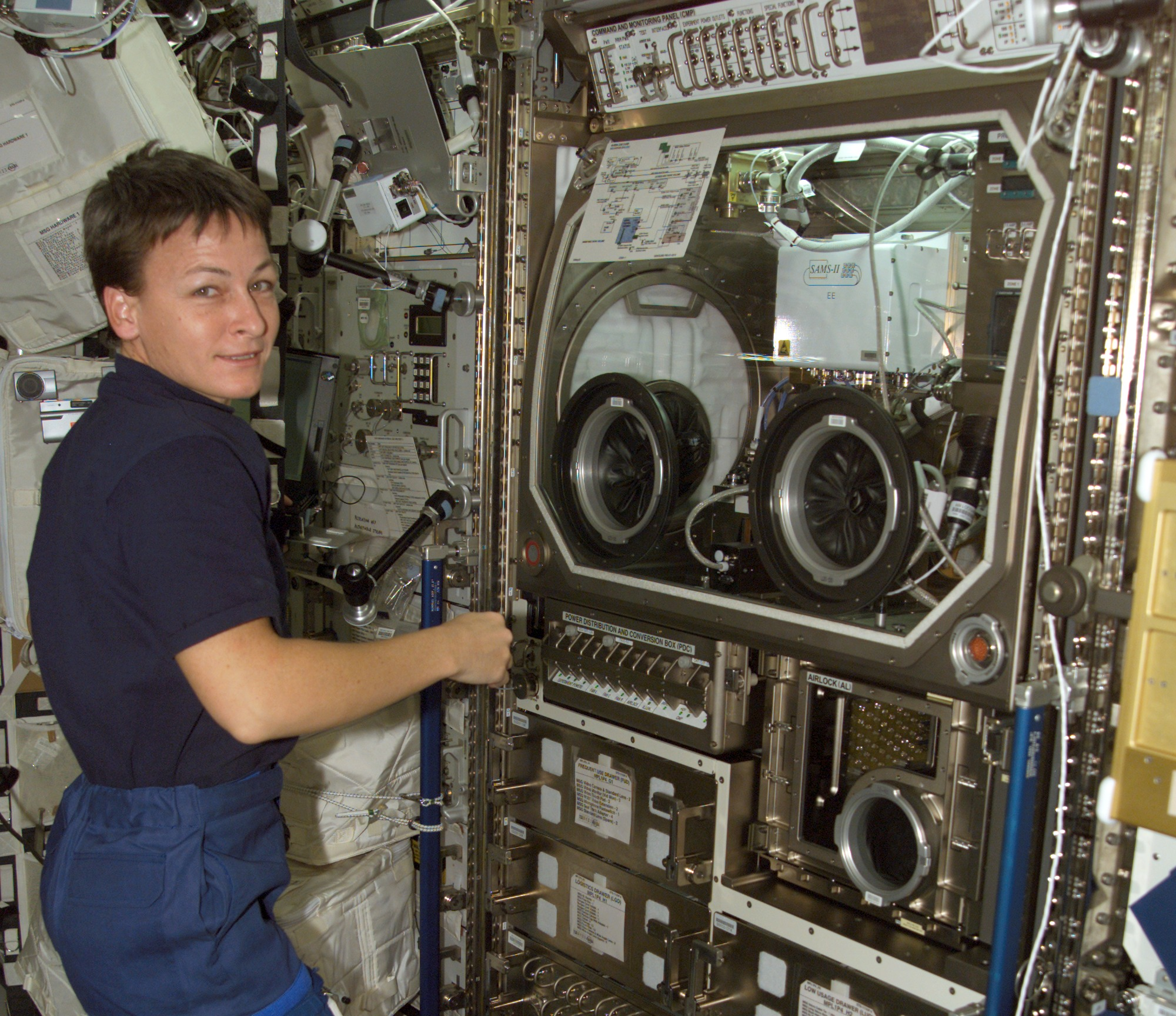
Whitson working near the Microgravity Science Glovebox during Expedition 5

The Expedition 5 crew launched on June 5, 2002, aboard STS-111 and docked with the International Space Station on June 7, 2002. During her six-month stay aboard the Space Station, Whitson installed the Mobile Base System, the S1 truss segment, and the P1 truss segment using the space station remote manipulator system; performed a 4-hour and 25 minute spacewalk in a Russian Orlan space suit to install micrometeoroid shielding on the Zvezda Service Module; and activated and checked out the Microgravity Sciences Glovebox, a facility class payload rack.

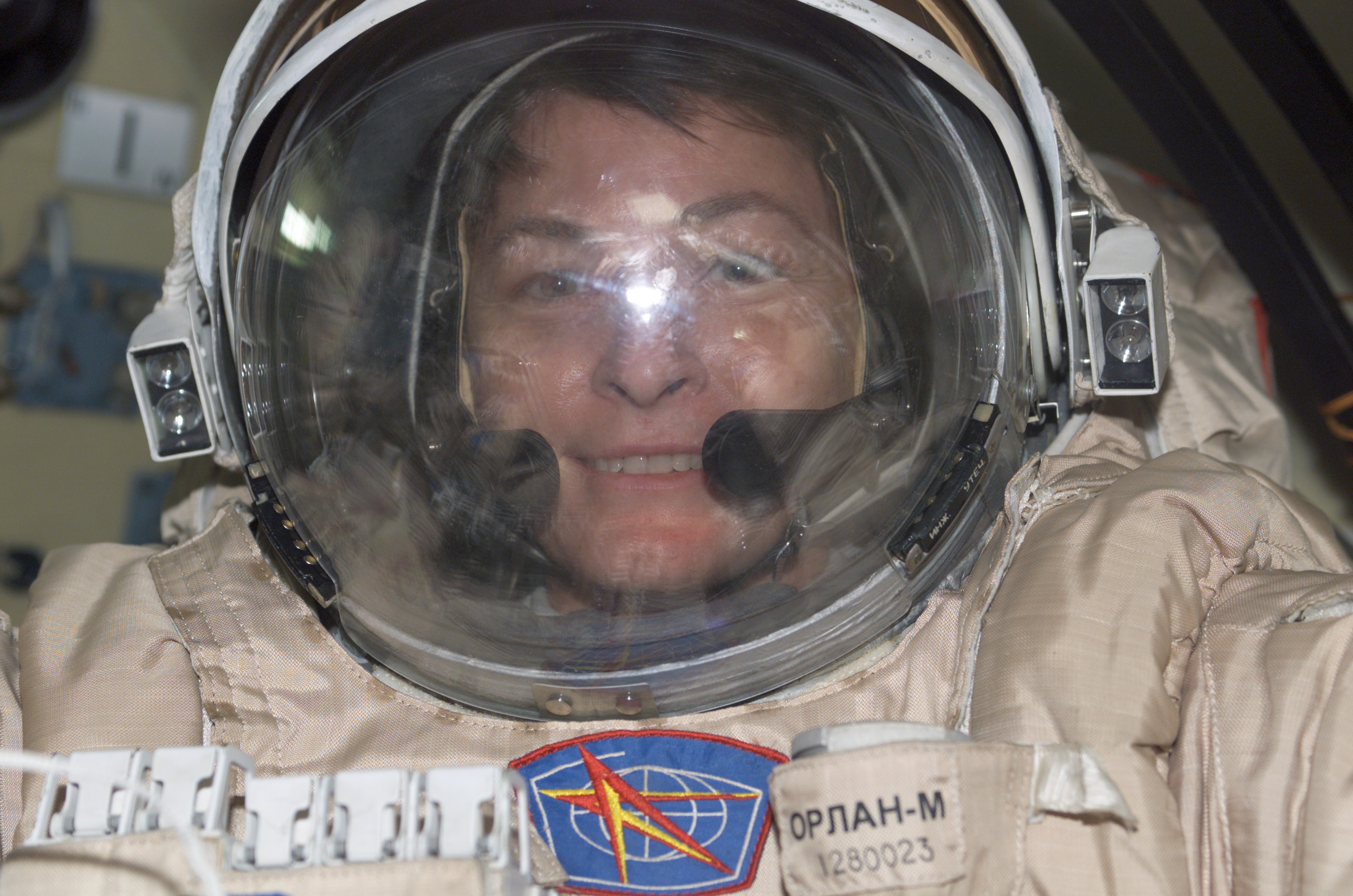
Peggy Whitson in the course of preparing for a spacewalk from the ISS during Expedition 5

Whitson was named the first NASA science officer during her stay, and she conducted 21 investigations in human life sciences and microgravity sciences, as well as commercial payloads. The Expedition 5 crew returned to Earth aboard STS-113 on December 7, 2002. Completing her first flight, Whitson logged 184 days, 22 hours and 14 minutes in space.

=== Expedition 16 ===
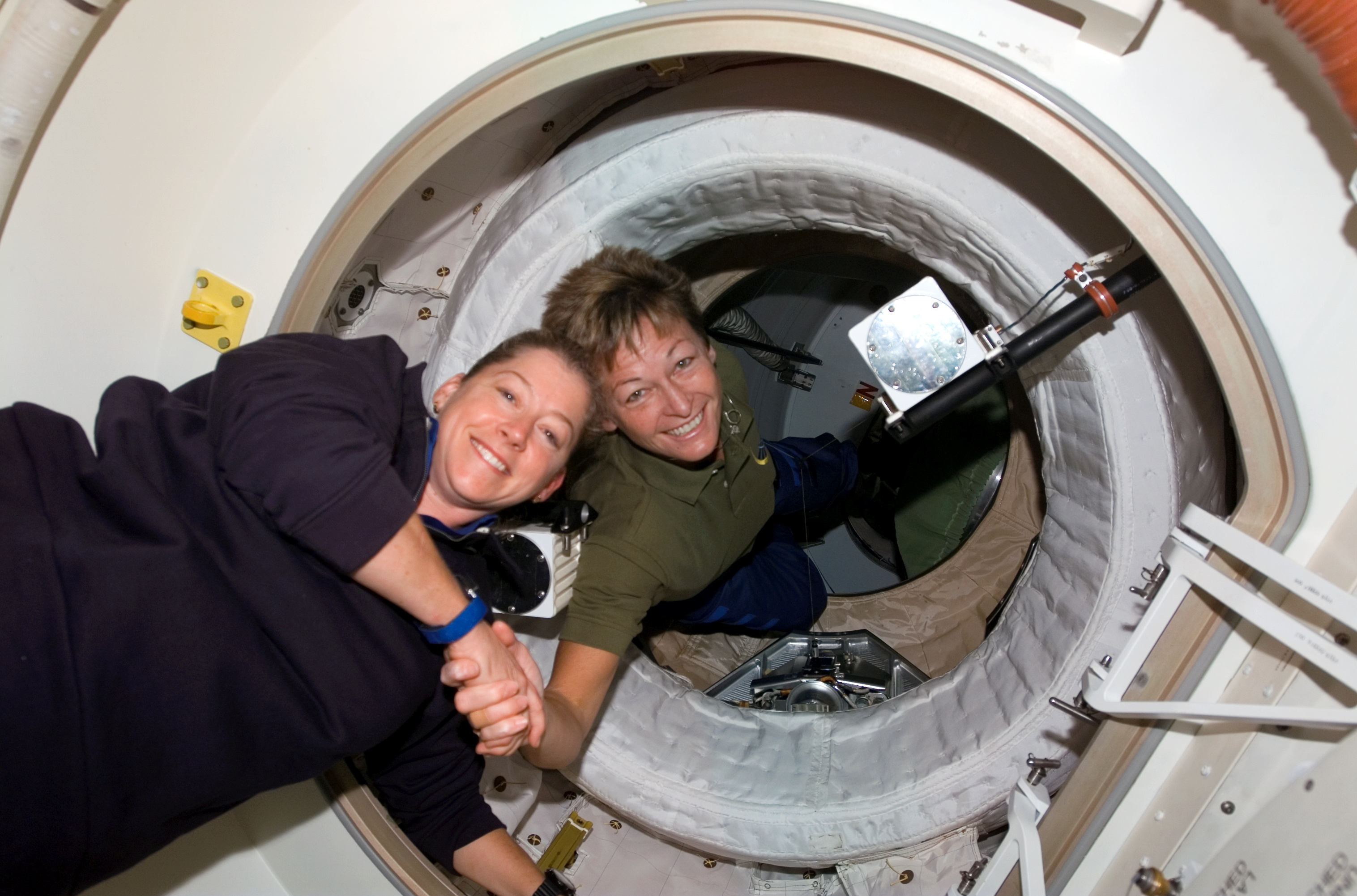
Expedition 16 commander Whitson greets STS-120 commander Pam Melroy

Her second mission, Expedition 16, launched October 10, 2007, on Soyuz TMA-11. Along with her Expedition 16 crew member Yuri Malenchenko and spaceflight participant Yi So-yeon, she returned to Earth in Soyuz TMA-11 on April 19, 2008. The re-entry was remarkable for the failure of the Soyuz propulsion module to separate properly, and the subsequent "ballistic reentry" which subjected the crew to forces about eight times that of Earth surface gravity. She spent 191 days, 19 hrs and 8 mins in space on this mission.

On December 18, 2007, during the fourth spacewalk of Expedition 16 to inspect the S4 starboard Solar Alpha Rotary Joint (SARJ), the ground team in Mission Control informed Whitson that she had become the female astronaut with the most cumulative EVA time in NASA history, as well as the most EVAs, with her fifth EVA. Three hours and 37 minutes into the spacewalk, Whitson surpassed NASA astronaut Sunita Williams with a total time at that point of 29 hours and 18 minutes. At the completion of Whitson's fifth EVA, the 100th in support of ISS assembly and maintenance, Whitson's cumulative EVA time became 32 hours, and 36 minutes, which placed her in 20th place for total EVA time. Her sixth spacewalk, also during Expedition 16, brought her cumulative EVA time to 39 hours, 46 minutes, which ranked her 23rd for total EVA time as of November 2009.

=== Expedition 50/51/52 ===
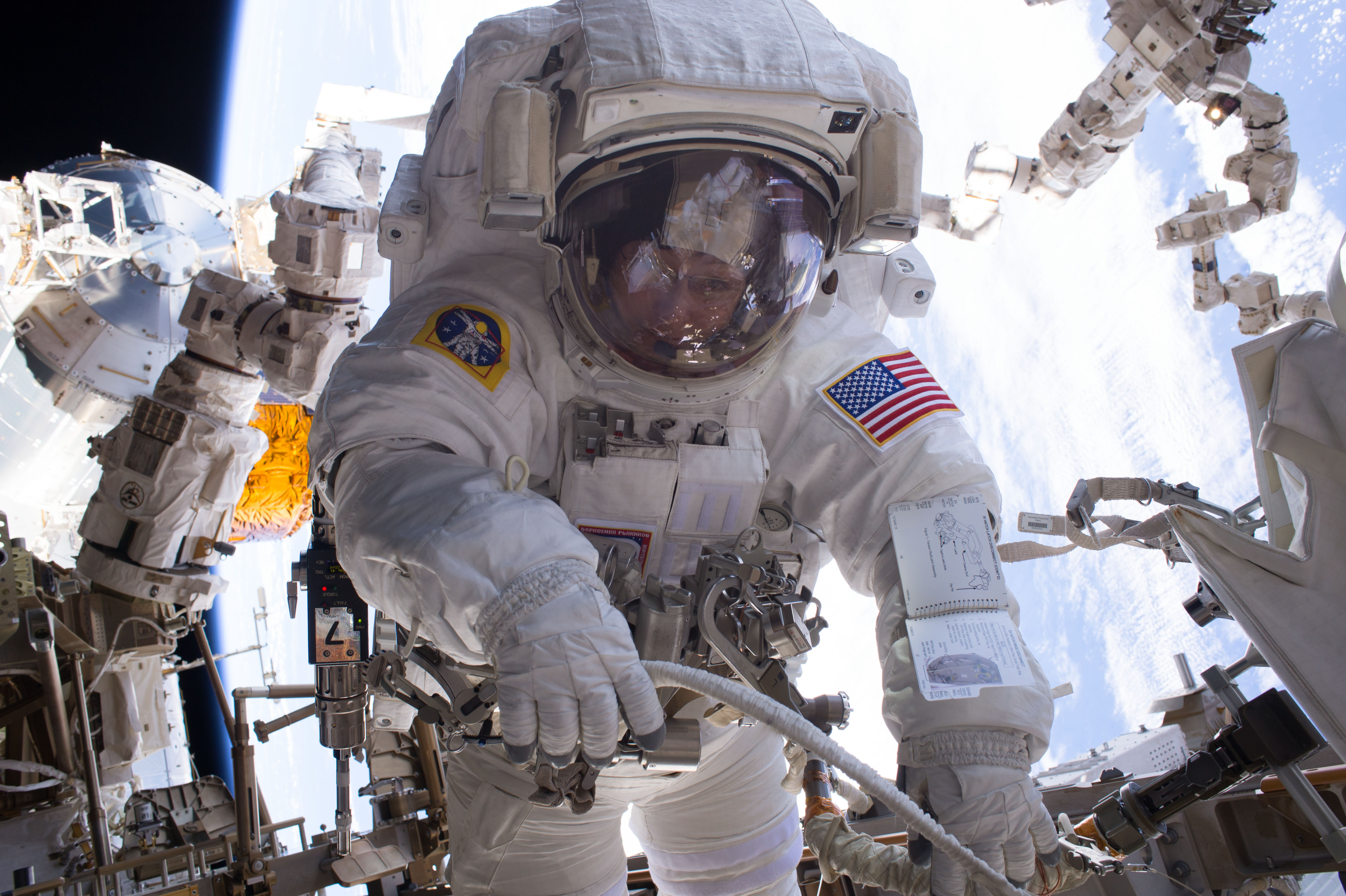
Whitson during an EVA with Expedition 50 commander Shane Kimbrough

Peggy Whitson arrived at the International Space Station on November 19, 2016, on Soyuz MS-03, which was launched on November 17, 2016, from the Baikonur cosmodrome in Kazakhstan. She became the commander of Expedition 51. With the launch of Expedition 50/51 with her on it, Whitson, at age 56, became the oldest woman to fly into space. During the mission, she broke the record for cumulative time spent in space by a U.S. astronaut, surpassing the previous record of 534 days set by Jeff Williams. In early April 2017, her mission was extended by an additional 3 months at the International Space Station. On September 3, she returned in a previously vacant seat on the Soyuz capsule accompanied by NASA's Jack Fischer and Fyodor Yurchikhin of Roscosmos.

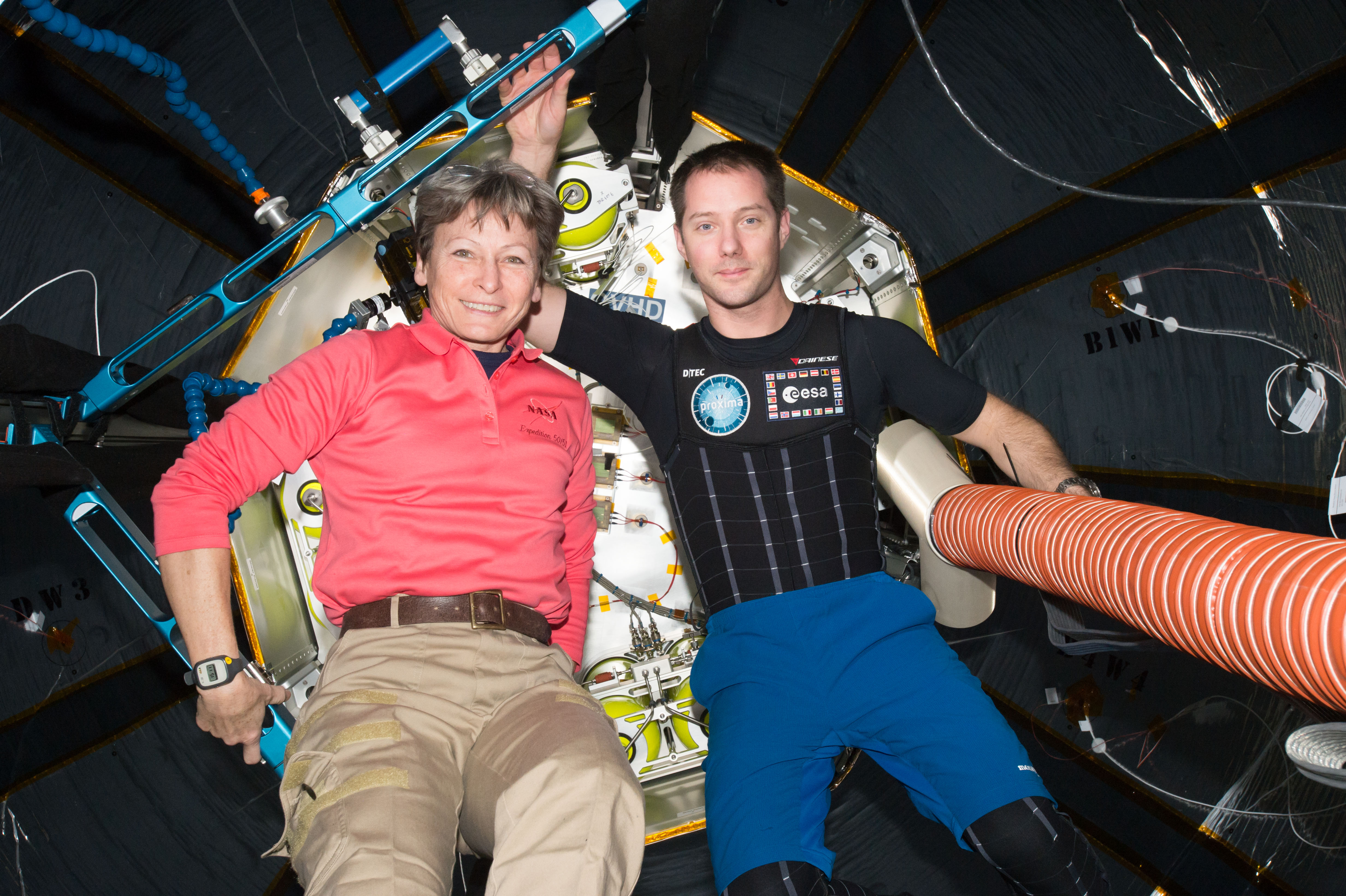
Whitson with fellow Soyuz MS-03 crew member Thomas Pesquet inside the BEAM

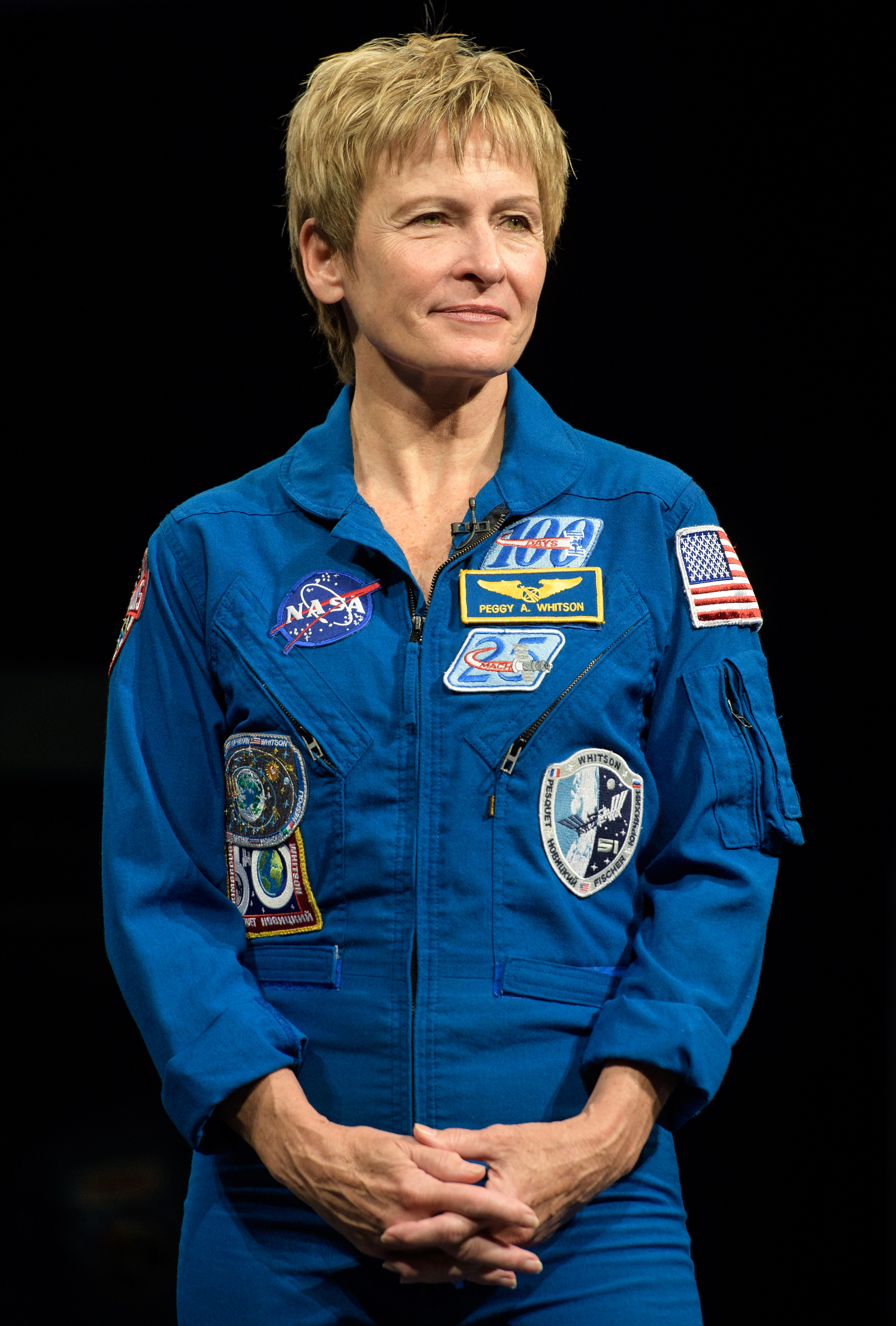
Whitson at the National Air and Space Museum in 2018

In January 2017, Whitson performed her seventh EVA with Expedition 50 commander Shane Kimbrough. During the EVA, three new adapter plates were installed and electrical connectors were hooked up preparing the way to replace the ISS's batteries. The EVA lasted 6 hours and 32 minutes. Whitson now holds the record for the oldest female spacewalker, and is now tied with the record for total spacewalks by a woman (seven), along with Sunita Williams. After completion of the seventh EVA, Whitson's cumulative EVA time became 46 hours, 18 minutes, which placed her in 13th place for total EVA time.

On April 24, 2017, Whitson officially broke the record for longest amount of time spent in space by any NASA astronaut. As a result, she received a televised phone call from the Oval Office from US President Donald Trump, the President's daughter Ivanka, and fellow astronaut Kathleen Rubins. When interviewed on that day she declared 'It is actually a huge honor to break a record like this, but it is an honor for me back to be representing all the folks at NASA'.

On May 12, 2017, Whitson performed her ninth career EVA with Jack Fischer. After a short delay due to leaking equipment, they replaced an avionics box on the starboard truss called an ExPRESS Logistics Carrier (ELC), a storage platform. The duration was 4 hours and 13 minutes, and it was the 200th EVA to be performed on the ISS.

On May 23, 2017, Whitson performed her tenth career EVA with Fischer. They replaced a backup multiplexer-demultiplexer (MDM) unit that had failed on May 20, 2017. The duration was 2 hours and 46 minutes, making Whitson's cumulative EVA time more than 60 hours, placing her third on the list for most EVA time.

On June 1, 2017, Whitson passed over the command of the International Space Station to Fyodor Yurchikhin, who was named commander of Expedition 52 until he, Whitson and Jack Fischer returned to Earth aboard Soyuz MS-04 in September 2017.

Whitson returned to Earth on September 3, 2017 after she accrued a total of 665 days in space over the course of her career. This total was more time in space than any other woman worldwide and any other American. As of April 2021, she is ranked ninth on the list of total time spent in space. The duration of her stay in space during expeditions 50/51/52 was 289 days, 5 hours and 1 minute. In June 2020, Whitson was a guest (along with two imposters) on an ABC-TV To Tell the Truth episode in which Patti LaBelle correctly selected her as the record-holding time in space astronaut.

=== Axiom 2 ===
Axiom 2 lifted off on 21 May 2023 from Launch Complex 39A at Kennedy Space Center, onboard a Falcon 9 Block 5 rocket. The mission, which was the second flight of Crew Dragon Freedom, docked with the International Space Station a day later.

During the mission, the crew performed public outreach activities along with scientific research, including studies into the effects of microgravity on stem cells and other biological experiments.

After eight days docked to the ISS, Axiom 2 undocked and returned to Earth twelve hours later. Freedom splashed down successfully in the Gulf of Mexico off the coast of Panama City, Florida. It was recovered by SpaceX's recovery ship Megan.

=== Axiom 4 ===
In April 2024, she was confirmed as the commander of Axiom 4, a 16-day mission to the ISS with a crew of four astronauts. The mission launched on 25 June 2025, which was the first flight of Crew Dragon Grace, docking with the International Space Station scheduled a day later. This launch came after a 15 day delay first due to high offshore winds, then by an oxygen leak in the first stage plumbing, and subsequently for air leaks in a compartment about the space station that connects the aft docking port to the Zvezda service module. The compartment in question was Russian made and is sealed unless a Russian spacecraft itself is using the docking port.

== Awards and honors ==
- NASA Outstanding Leadership Medal (2006)
- NASA Space Flight Medal (2002)
- Patents awarded (1997, 1998)
- Group Achievement Award for Shuttle-Mir Program (1996)
- American Astronautical Society Randolph Lovelace II Award (1995)
- NASA Tech Brief Award (1995)
- NASA Space Act Board Award (1995, 1998)
- NASA Silver Snoopy Award (1995)
- NASA Exceptional Service Medal (1995, 2003, 2006)
- NASA Space Act Award for Patent Application
- NASA Certificate of Commendation (1994)
- NASA Sustained Superior Performance Award (1990)
- Medal "For Merit in Space Exploration" (Russia, April 12, 2011) – for outstanding contribution to the development of international cooperation in crewed space flight
- Krug International Merit Award (1989)
- NASA-JSC National Research Council Resident Research Associate (1986–1988)
- Robert A. Welch Postdoctoral Fellowship (1985–1986)
- Robert A. Welch Predoctoral Fellowship (1982–1985)
- Summa cum laude from Iowa Wesleyan College (1981)
- President's Honor Roll (1978–1981)
- Orange van Calhoun Scholarship (1980)
- State of Iowa Scholar (1979)
- Academic Excellence Award (1978)
- Included in the Time 100 list of influential people for 2018.
- Women in Space Science Award (2019).
- International Air and Space Hall of Fame (2018)
- "Women on the Move" Award (2010)
- Space Flight Award (2017)
- She was recognized as one of the BBC's 100 women of 2017.
- United States Astronaut Hall of Fame (2025)

Preceded by Fyodor Yurchikhin	ISS Commander (Expedition 16); 21 April to 21 October 2007	Succeeded by Sergey Volkov
Preceded by Steven W. Lindsey	Chief of the Astronaut Office; 2009–2012	Succeeded by Robert L. Behnken
Preceded by Robert S. Kimbrough	ISS Commander (Expedition 51); 10 April to 2 June 2017	Succeeded by Fyodor Yurchikhin
