= Dewey Smith =

American aquanaut (1972–2009)

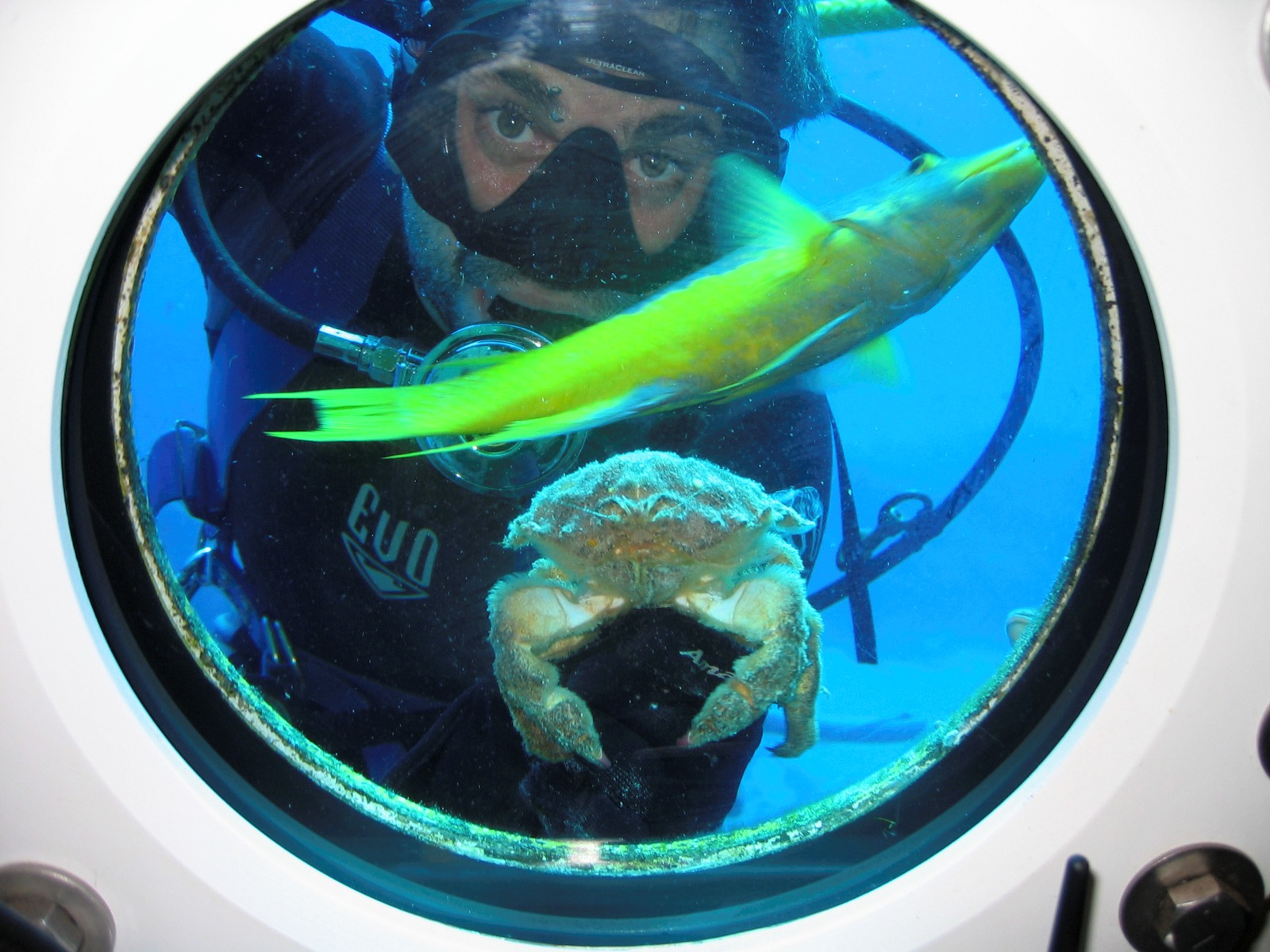
- Smith seen through viewport of Aquarius underwater habitat.
- Born: Dewey Dewayne Smith; July 24, 1972; Kirkwood, Missouri, U.S.
- Died: May 5, 2009 (aged 36) near Aquarius Reef Base, Key Largo, Florida, U.S.
- Education: B.S., underwater crime scene investigation, Florida State University
- Occupations: U.S. Navy Hospital Corpsman, commercial diver, aquanaut

Dewey Dewayne Smith (July 24, 1972 – May 5, 2009) was an underwater diver, former United States Navy medic and professional aquanaut. He died during a dive from the Aquarius underwater habitat off Key Largo in May 2009. A subsequent investigation determined that multiple factors combined to cause the accident.

== Life and career ==
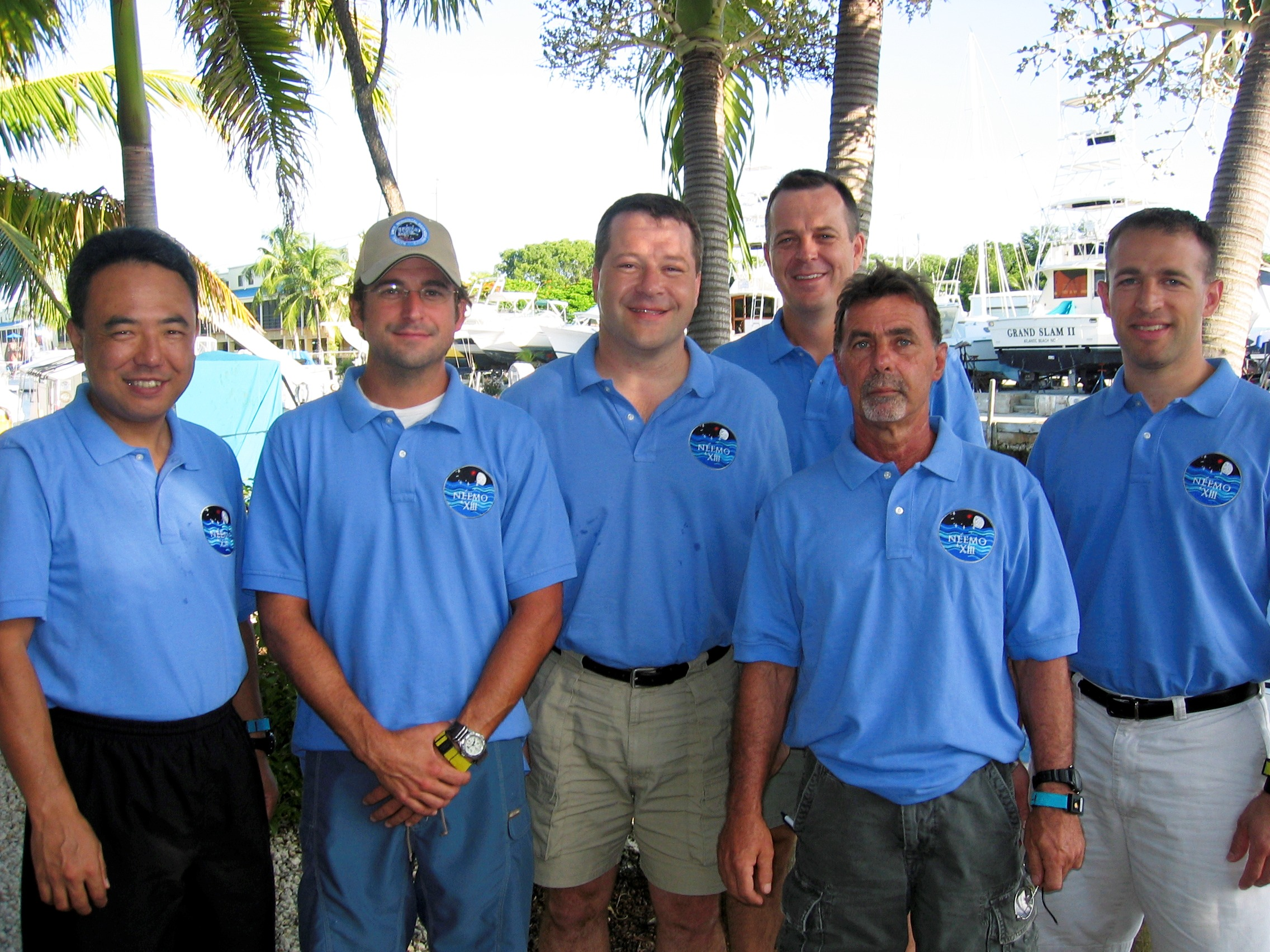
The NEEMO 13 Crew: Left to right: JAXA astronaut Satoshi Furukawa, Smith, NASA astronauts Nicholas Patrick and Richard R. Arnold, habitat technician Jim Buckley, NASA engineer Christopher E. Gerty.

Smith was born in Kirkwood, Missouri, but grew up and lived for most of his life in Panama City, Florida. He served in the United States Navy as a Hospital Corpsman aboard the USS Peleliu in San Diego, California, and was honorably discharged after five years of service. He learned to scuba dive while working with Florida State University's Underwater Crime Scene Investigation program. Smith graduated from FSU with a B.S. degree in underwater crime scene investigation in 2005. He subsequently worked as a commercial diver with Miracle Strip Welding & Marine Services and RME-Diver in Panama City Beach, Florida.

Smith joined Aquarius, which is owned by the National Oceanic and Atmospheric Administration (NOAA) and operated by the University of North Carolina Wilmington, in 2007. He worked as a habitat technician and undersea research diver. As part of his work with Aquarius, Smith answered questions from schoolchildren.

In August 2007, Smith took part as a habitat technician in the NASA Extreme Environment Mission Operations 13 (NEEMO 13) mission, one of a series of NASA-NOAA missions which use Aquarius as an analog environment for space exploration. The NEEMO 13 crew lived and worked underwater aboard Aquarius for ten days.

== Death ==
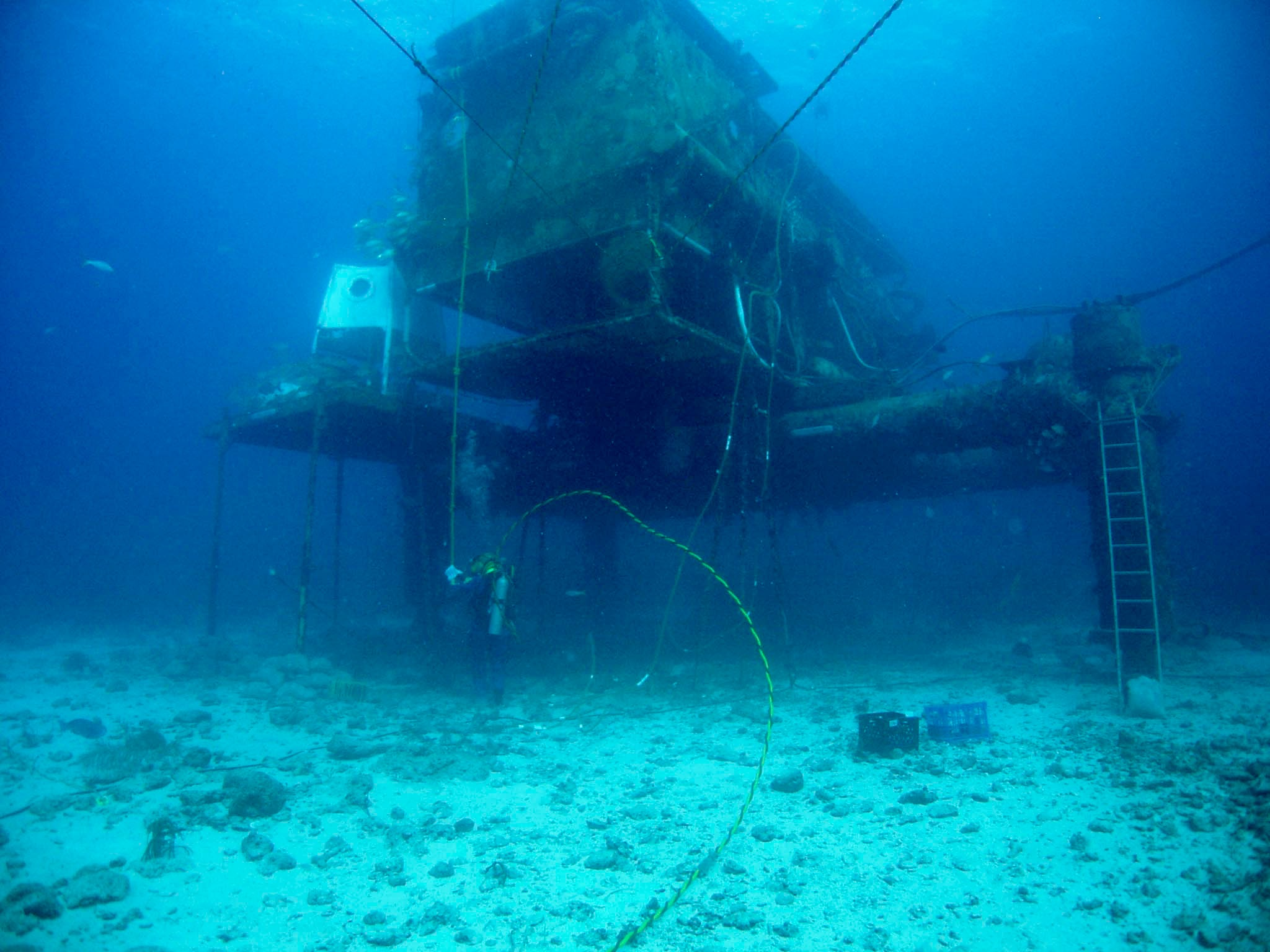
The Aquarius habitat.

In May 2009, Smith was aboard Aquarius to train U.S. Navy divers in saturation diving and prepare for upcoming scientific studies in the Conch Reef area.

On May 5, 2009, Smith was assisting two Navy divers, Bill Dodd and Corey Seymour, who were 300 feet (91 m) from Aquarius using an underwater jackhammer to install a way station that would contain breathable air. Smith informed Dodd and Seymour that he was returning to Aquarius but would be back. Five or ten minutes later, Seymour noticed that Smith was lying on his side in the water, his mouthpiece out of his mouth. Seymour began carrying Smith back to Aquarius, but his air umbilical became fouled about thirty yards from the habitat. Dodd carried Smith the rest of the distance to Aquarius, where the other divers in the habitat helped them get Smith inside. Resuscitation attempts by Dodd, Seymour, and two Navy physicians who dove to the habitat were unsuccessful. Smith was pronounced dead at 3:25 pm by a Navy doctor. His death was the first associated with the Aquarius program.

A subsequent investigation by a panel of outside experts determined that Smith's death was caused by a combination of three factors: the failure of the electronic functions of his Inspiration closed circuit rebreather (CCR) due to hydrodynamic forces from the hydraulic impact hammer being used nearby, Smith's inattention to his handset and head up displays, and the other two divers allowing Smith to return to Aquarius alone. The investigation concluded that due to these issues Smith became unconscious from hypoxia and drowned when the mouthpiece came out of his mouth. Saturation and CCR diving at Aquarius were suspended in the wake of Smith's death, but the review board recommended that they be resumed with the implementation of additional safety measures.

== Tributes ==
Energy and Environment Subcommittee Chairman Brian Baird recognized Smith's service on the floor of the U.S. House of Representatives. U.S. Representative Ileana Ros-Lehtinen, whose district includes the Florida Keys and who had met Smith during a visit to the Aquarius facility, also offered a statement of condolence. On May 15, 2009, at a panel at International Space Medicine Summit III devoted to human performance in analog environments, astronaut-aquanaut Dafydd Williams, who had participated in two NEEMO missions, asked for a moment of silence in Smith's memory. Aquarius donated a Superlite 17 diving helmet, the helmet most frequently worn by Aquarius aquanauts, to the History of Diving Museum in Islamorada, Florida in memory of Smith.
