= Emma Hwang =

Scientist with Wyle Laboratories and aquanaut on NEEMO 5

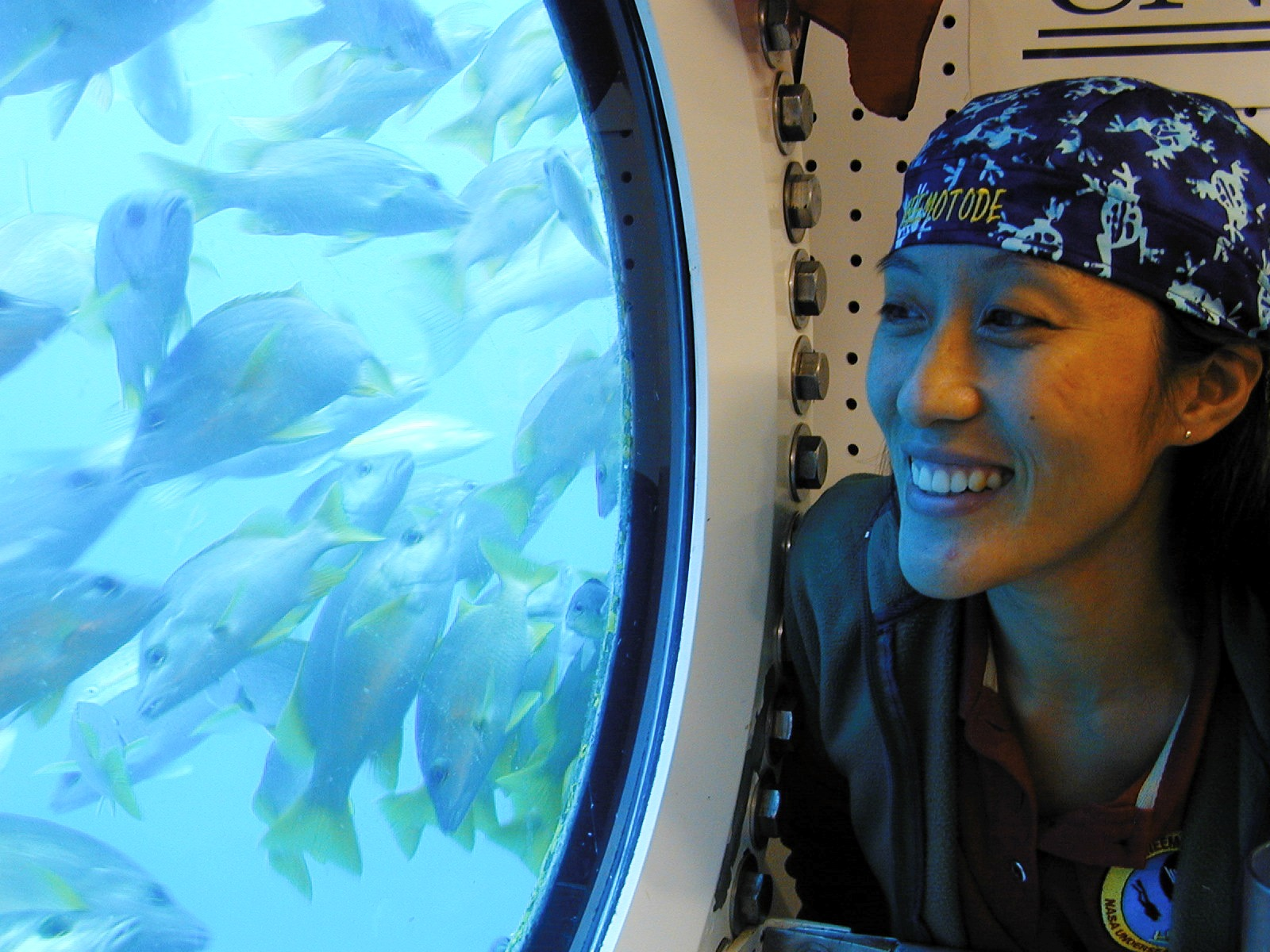
- Born: Yu-liang Hwang; July 21, 1970 (age 55); Taiwan
- Education: Boston University (BA); University of Michigan (MS, MS, PhD)
- Occupation: Scientist
- Employer: Wyle Laboratories
- Known for: Aquanaut

Emma Y. Hwang (born Yu-liang Hwang on July 21, 1970) is a Taiwanese-American researcher with Wyle Laboratories. She served as an aquanaut on the NASA Extreme Environment Mission Operations 5 (NEEMO 5) crew in June 2003.

== Early life and education ==
Yu-liang Hwang was born in southern Taiwan. After joining her family on the West Coast of the United States at the age of two, she was dubbed Emma. Most of her early education occurred in central and southeast Texas, and she graduated from Ball High School in Galveston. Growing up along the Texas Gulf Coast initiated her interest in the space program (though she was born a year and a day late for the first Apollo Moon landing).

Hwang received her bachelor's degree in biomedical engineering at Boston University in Boston, Massachusetts. During her junior year, she took a year-and-a-half cooperative study opportunity with Lockheed Missiles and Space Company in Houston, Texas. While in Boston, Hwang first became interested in scuba diving, stemming from her fascination with Jacques Cousteau's work. However, she did not pursue training at that time due to lack of resources and the mostly cold environment in Boston. Hwang moved to Ann Arbor, Michigan to attend graduate school at the University of Michigan where she earned two master's degrees, in biomedical engineering and electrical engineering systems. While in graduate school, she took a detour from her studies and became a teacher in the martial arts of Aikido and Iaido. After several more years, she finally earned her Ph.D. in biomedical engineering from the University of Michigan. In graduate school, she researched and developed new medical techniques using ultrasound.

== Career ==
After considering a move out to the Western United States, Hwang chose to return to the Texas Gulf Coast, where she would be closer to her sisters, brother, and new nephew. Her decision to return to Texas also involved the opportunity to work again in the space industry for Wyle Laboratories.

Hwang joined Wyle in September 2001. Initially, she worked as a scientist in the Sensors Group under Dr. Antony Jeevarajan, researching and developing oxygen, carbon dioxide, and pH sensing techniques for monitoring the health of cell cultures that would be grown on the Space Shuttle or station. In 2002 she became a scientist with the Neurosciences Group under Dr. Bill Paloski, which studies the effects of space flight on balance control problems which astronauts experience upon return to Earth, and develops possible countermeasures that will help astronauts to adapt more quickly to both the microgravity of space and the 1-g environment on Earth. As of 2011, Hwang is working with the Integrated Science & Engineering (ISE) Group at Wyle's Houston office as Exercise Physiology and Countermeasures Project Manager.

== NEEMO 5 ==
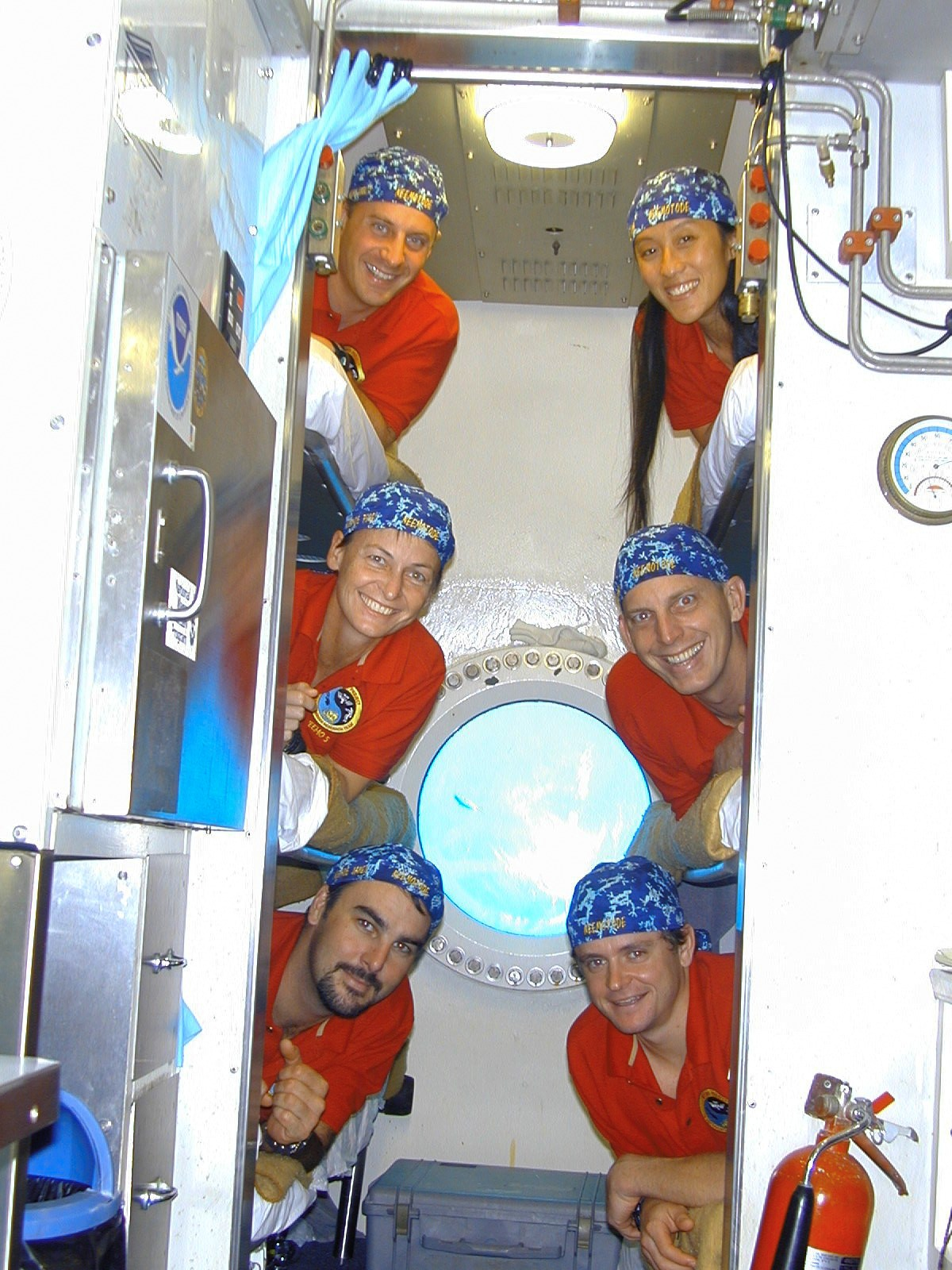
NEEMO 5 crew members are pictured in the bunkroom aboard the Aquarius research habitat. Top, L-R: Garrett Reisman, Hwang; Middle: Peggy Whitson, Clayton Anderson; Bottom: James Talacek, Ryan Snow.

In June 2003, Hwang became an aquanaut through her participation in the joint NASA-NOAA, NEEMO 5 (NASA Extreme Environment Mission Operations) project, an exploration research mission held in Aquarius, the world's only undersea research laboratory. NEEMO 5 was the longest NEEMO mission to that date, with the crew living underwater for fourteen days. During the mission, Hwang took part in a telemedicine simulation in which two fellow crew members, directed remotely by a doctor in Houston, used an ultrasound machine to diagnose a supposed kidney stone.
