= List of cumulative spacewalk records =

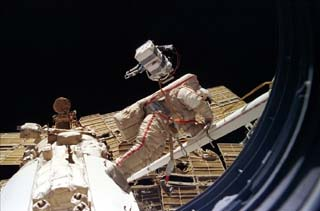
View of Mir-24 commander Anatoly Solovyev performing an EVA

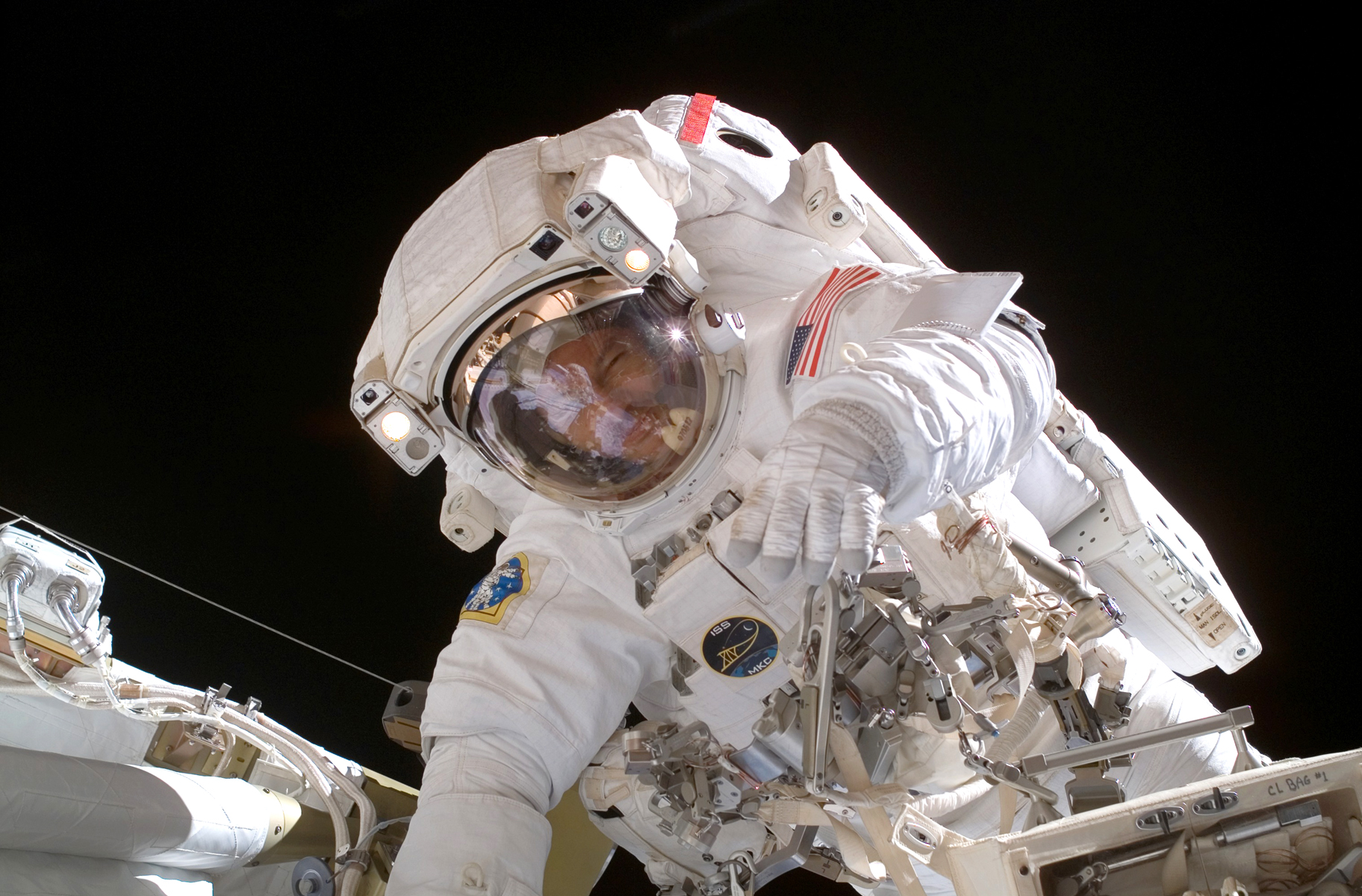
Astronaut Michael E. Lopez-Alegria, Expedition 14 commander during an EVA

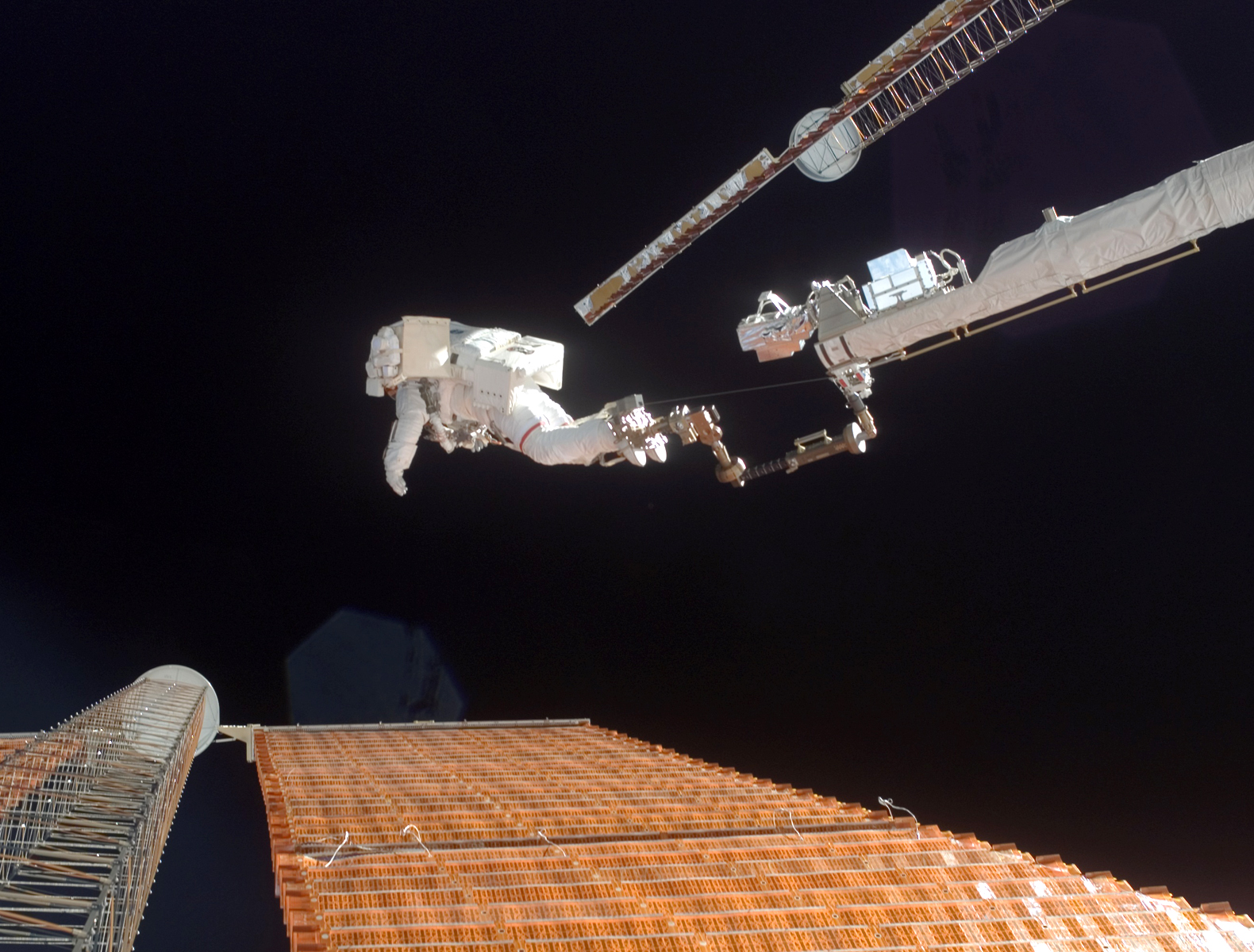
Anchored to a foot restraint on the end of the Orbiter Boom Sensor System (OBSS), astronaut Scott Parazynski, STS-120 mission specialist, assesses his repair work on a solar array. Photo taken by Douglas Wheelock.

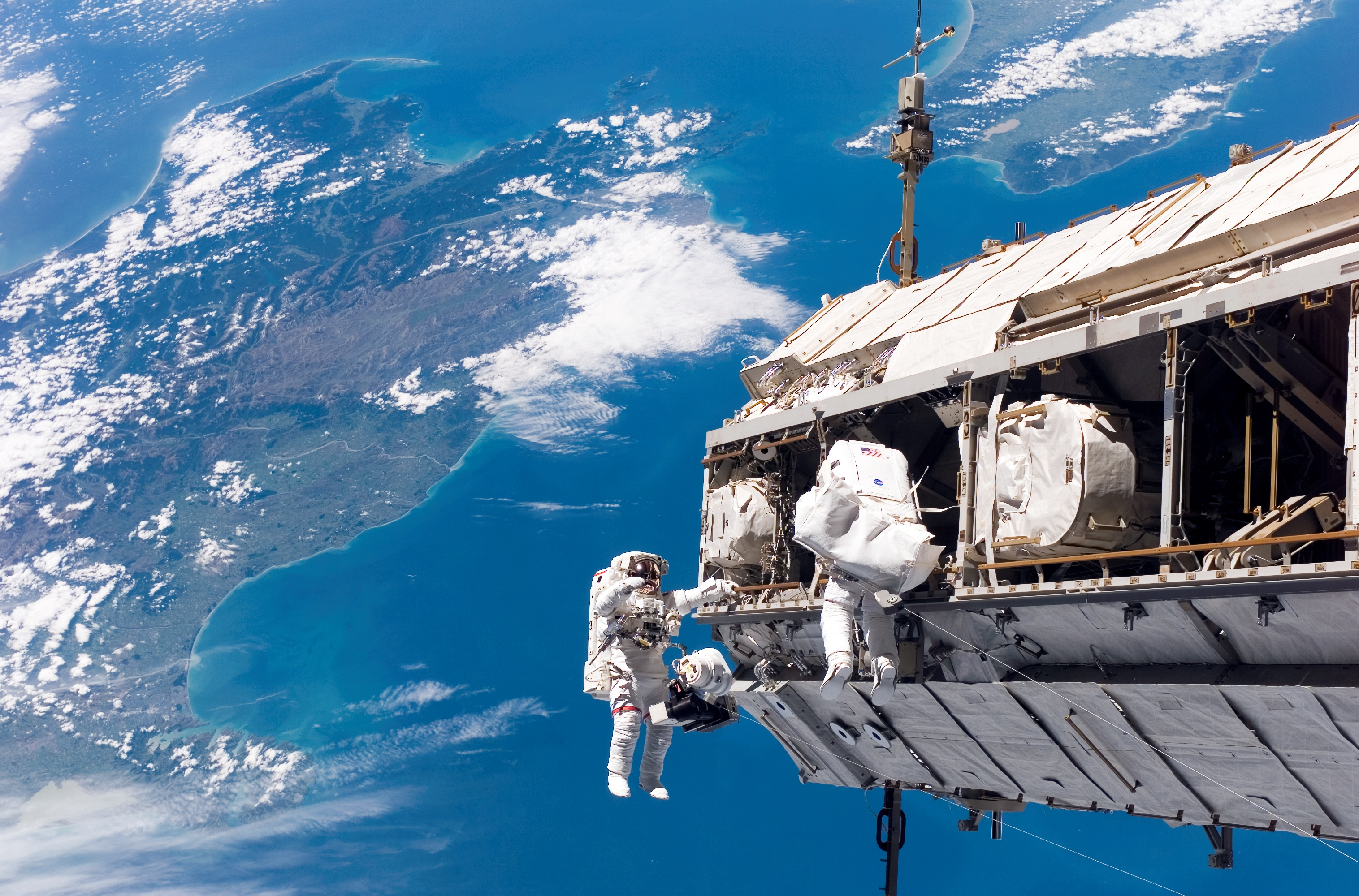
Backdropped by a colorful Earth, astronaut Robert L. Curbeam, Jr. (left) and European Space Agency (ESA) astronaut Christer Fuglesang, both STS-116 mission specialists, participate in an EVA.

This is a list of cumulative spacewalk records for the 32 astronauts who have the most extra-vehicular activity (EVA) time. The record is currently held by Anatoly Solovyev of the Russian Federal Space Agency, with 82:22 hours from 16 EVAs, followed by NASA's Michael Lopez-Alegria with 67:40 hours in 10 EVAs. This list is current as of April 17, 2026. The RSA designation includes spacewalks under the earlier Soviet space program.

== List ==
Color key:

- Currently in space
- Active
- Retired
- Deceased

Number	Astronaut	Agency	Status	Total EVAs	Total time Hours: minutes
1	Anatoly Solovyev	RSA	Retired	16	82:22
2	Michael Lopez-Alegria	NASA	Retired	10^{[C]}	67:40
3	Stephen G. Bowen	NASA	Retired	10	65:57
4	Sunita Williams	NASA	Retired	9	62:06
5	Andrew J. Feustel	NASA	Retired	9	61:48
6	Bob Behnken	NASA	Retired	10^{[A]}	61:10
7	Peggy Whitson	NASA	Active	10^{[D]}	60:21
8	Fyodor Yurchikhin	RSA	Retired	9	59:28
9	Shane Kimbrough	NASA	Retired	9	59:28
10	John M. Grunsfeld	NASA	Retired	8	58:30
11	Jerry L. Ross	NASA	Retired	9	57:55
12	Sergey Prokopyev	RSA	Active	8	55:15
13	Christopher Cassidy	NASA	Retired	10^{[B]}	54:51
14	Oleg Artemyev	RSA	Retired	8	53:32
15	Richard Mastracchio	NASA	Retired	9	53:04
16	Zhang Lu	CMSA	Active	7	50:48
17	Steven L. Smith	NASA	Retired	7	49:48
18	Jessica Meir	NASA	Active	7	49:22
19	Michael Fincke	NASA	Retired	9	48:37
20	Michael E. Fossum	NASA	Retired	7	48:32
21	Scott E. Parazynski	NASA	Retired	7	47:05
22	Joseph R. Tanner	NASA	Retired	7	46:29
23	Andrew Morgan	NASA	Retired	7	45:48
24	Robert L. Curbeam	NASA	Retired	7	45:34
25	Oleg Kononenko	RSA	Active	7	44:30
26	Nikolai Budarin	RSA	Retired	8	44:25
27	Douglas H. Wheelock	NASA	Active	6	43:30
28	James H. Newman	NASA	Retired	6	43:13
29	Yuri Onufrienko	RSA	Retired	8	42:33
30	Christina Koch	NASA	Active	6	42:15
31	Richard Linnehan	NASA	Retired	6	42:12
32	Sergey Avdeev	RSA	Retired	10	42:02

=== Notes ===
Behnken^{A} and Cassidy^{B} are the first to complete 10 spacewalks in NASA EMU suits. Whitson and López-Alegría used Russian Orlan Space Suits for some of their spacewalks: López-Alegría^{C} completed 2 and Whitson^{D} completed 1 spacewalk(s) with an Orlan space suit.

== See also ==
- List of longest spacewalks
- List of spacewalkers
- List of spacewalks and moonwalks 1965–1999
- List of spacewalks 2000–2014
- List of spacewalks since 2015
- Space suit
