= Christopher E. Gerty =

American aerospace engineer who worked on NASA's Constellation Program

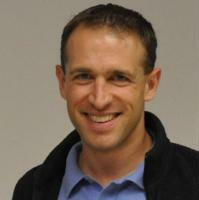
- Born: October 19, 1975 (age 50); East Moriches, New York, U.S.
- Education: Clarkson University (BS)
- Occupation: Aerospace engineer
- Employer: NASA
- Known for: Aquanaut
- Title: Open Government Analyst, Engineer
- Spouse: Maureen (Smith) Gerty

Christopher E. Gerty (born October 19, 1975) is an American aerospace engineer who worked on NASA's Constellation Program. Gerty is an advocate of NASA's Open Government Initiative and is a leading voice on the concept of participatory exploration and collaboration. He has fifteen years of experience working on complex, technology-intense projects at NASA. Gerty served as an aquanaut on the NASA Extreme Environment Mission Operations 13 (NEEMO 13) crew.

== Education ==
Gerty was born on Long Island in East Moriches, New York. His father was an insurance underwriter for Metropolitan Life. Gerty has one younger sister.

Gerty's interest in spaceflight and NASA began at Gatelot Elementary in Lake Ronkonkoma, New York. His fifth-grade teacher led his class through the investigation of the Challenger accident in 1986. Gerty's class learned not only about the causes of the accident, but what the Space Shuttle did and why humans traveled in space. To the ten-year-old Gerty, spaceflight seemed like a necessary and noble thing for humans to do, even if there were some risks.

After that experience in elementary school Gerty dreamed of being an astronaut when he grew up. Gerty attended Hilton High School near Rochester, New York, from 1989 to 1990 and New Paltz High School, New Paltz, New York, from 1991 to 1993. He took up skiing while in Rochester and floor and roller hockey in New Paltz.

Gerty attended Clarkson University in Potsdam, New York, earning a B.S. in Computer Engineering in 1997. He played intramural ice hockey while at Clarkson. During his college years Gerty realized that flying in space was not his real goal, but rather helping humans explore and extend their sphere of influence to other worlds. One of the reasons he had chosen Clarkson was that it was part of a Space Grant Consortium that received grants from NASA. Gerty knew that this program only affected graduate students, but that an undergraduate from any school could participate in a NASA cooperative education program. Through Clarkson's career center he applied for and attained a cooperative education program position at NASA's Johnson Space Center (JSC) in Houston, Texas, where he worked with programmers, pilots and spaceflight procedure writers. When Gerty finished several co-op tours and graduated, he knew he wanted to work for NASA, and accepted a job offer at JSC as a flight controller.

== NASA career ==
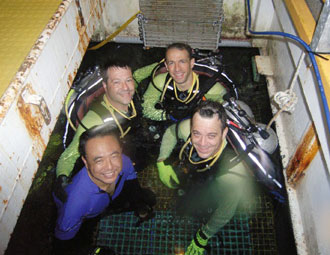
The NEEMO 13 Crew: Left to right (rear): Nicholas Patrick, Gerty; front: Satoshi Furukawa, Richard R. Arnold.

Gerty's NASA experience includes positions as Robotics Division Engineering Co-op from 1996 to 1998; Aircraft Operations Co-op Engineer at Ellington Field in 1997; and Payloads Flight Controller from 1998 to 2001. He served as Extravehicular Activity (EVA or spacewalk) Flight Controller and Crew Trainer in the EVA Systems group in Mission Operations from 2001 to 2006. In that position he taught astronauts how to keep themselves alive and comfortable enough to perform their tasks while doing a spacewalk, or EVA. As part of this job he performed a simulated EVA in a NASA spacesuit at the Neutral Buoyancy Laboratory. After "spacewalking" underwater, he had a new appreciation for the difficulty of the construction of the International Space Station (ISS) and the skills of the astronauts who performed ISS construction.

After his time in the EVA group, in 2006 Gerty became a Constellation Program Systems Integration Engineer, helping plan for lunar missions. He worked with a group defining requirements for what humans need to live and work on the surface of the Moon. The planning covered not only short missions like those of the Apollo program, but long-term missions taking up half a year or more, and covered not only EVAs, but solving the problems of habitation and physiological problems as well. To do this, the group examined the past Apollo missions, long-duration Expeditions to the ISS, and "spaceflight analog missions" like NEEMO, which in many ways simulate a mission to the Moon. In Gerty's words: "NASA has questions like, 'What is the best way for robots and humans to work together on the lunar or Martian surface?', or 'How much room do astronauts need to live and work in 1/6 of the Earth's gravity, compared to the zero-gravity on the ISS?'"

In August 2007, Gerty served as Mission Specialist No. 3 during the NEEMO 13 project, an exploration research mission held in Aquarius, the world's only undersea research laboratory. He served as a liaison for the Constellation Program, living underwater for ten days to study the effects of long-duration spaceflight and test lunar and Martian exploration concepts. Gerty wrote:

Spacewalks are very analogous to diving in the ocean. In both situations you need a supply of oxygen to breathe, relative control of pressure and temperature, a means of moving around in a three-dimensional environment, and protection from the hazards ... The results [of NEEMO 13] will be used to make us more prepared when it is time to put a few more footprints and tire tracks on the moon, and eventually realize the goal of extending the human race to other planets!

Since 2010, Gerty has been an Open Government Analyst at NASA. He has a blog located at http://open.nasa.gov/blog/author/cgerty/.

== Personal life ==
Gerty is married to Maureen (Smith) Gerty of Saratoga Springs, New York, a chemical engineer whom he met while in college. They have two German Shepherds and a cat. Gerty's hobbies include bicycling, photography, computers, ice hockey, astronomy, camping and traveling. He is a member of the American Astronautical Society and has taken part in Random Hacks of Kindness.
