= Conch Reef =

Coral reef in the Florida Keys, US

- Location within Florida Location within the Caribbean

Location
- Location: Caribbean
- Coordinates: 24°57′11″N 080°27′30″W
- Country: United States

Geology
- Type: reef

Conch Reef is a coral reef located within the Florida Keys National Marine Sanctuary. It lies to the southeast of Plantation Key. This reef is within a Sanctuary Preservation Area (SPA). Adjacent to the SPA is a "Research Only" zone and the Aquarius underwater laboratory is at the center of the zone. Outside of these zones is Conch Wall, a deep wall reef.
