= Kathleen Matthews (biochemist) =

American biochemist

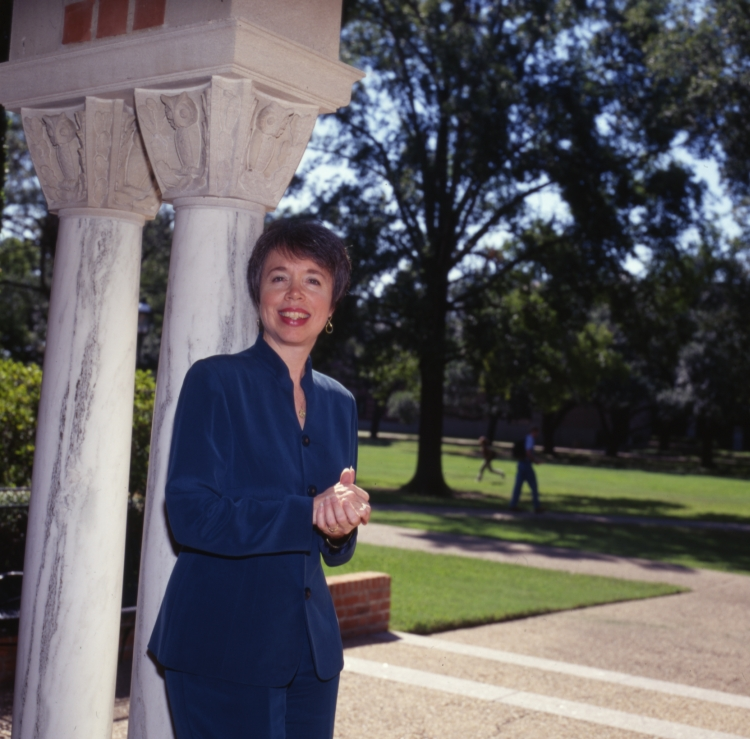
Kathleen Matthews, 1998

Kathleen Matthews is an American biochemist specializing in DNA/protein interactions, specifically related to the lac repressor. She is the Stewart Memorial Professor Emerita of BioSciences at Rice University.

== Career ==
Kathleen ("Kathy") Shive Matthews is Stewart Memorial Professor Emerita in BioSciences at Rice University and a founding member of the Biochemistry department, which later merged to become the BioSciences department. She received a B.S. in chemistry from the University of Texas at Austin in 1966 and went on to obtain her PhD in biochemistry from the University of California, Berkeley in 1970. After working as a postdoctoral fellow at Stanford university, she joined the faculty at Rice as an Assistant Professor in Biochemistry at its inception in 1972. Later, she became department chair of the Department of Biochemistry from 1987 to 1995, and between 1998 and 2009 was the Dean of the Wiess School of Natural Sciences. As Dean, Matthews was co-principal investigator on a National Science Foundation ADVANCE grant aimed at recruiting and developing the careers of women in academia in the fields of science and engineering.

== Research ==
Matthews' research focused on the interactions of protein and DNA, in particular lac repressor and the Hox gene protein Ultrabithorax. Matthews built upon that of other biochemists, including Temple F. Smith and John "Jack" Sadler, and investigated how cysteine thiol groups within the lac repressor core directly interacted with the lac operon, initially proposing that the four core regions in each of the homotetramer lac repressor protein were all required for binding with the lac operon in 1980. Later, Matthews investigated how specific subunits of the lac repressor interact with one another and consequently affect the functioning of the repressor. She has written over 170 papers during her career, which lasted over 50 years.

== Awards ==
In 1996 she was elected a fellow of the American Association for the Advancement of Science. In 2010, Matthews was honored as a Women in Science with Excellence honoree for her role in the Biochemistry department at Rice. She received the William C. Rose Award in 2015 for her work in DNA-binding proteins and her commitment to mentoring young scientists.

== Selected publications ==
- Manly, Susan P.; Matthews, Kathleen S.; Sturtevant, Julian M. (1985). "Thermal denaturation of the core protein of lac repressor". Biochemistry. 24 (15): 3842–3846. doi:10.1021/bi00336a004. ISSN 0006-2960. PMID 3902076.
- Matthews, K. S. (1992). "DNA looping". Microbiological Reviews. 56 (1): 123–136. doi:10.1128/MMBR.56.1.123-136.1992. PMC 372857. PMID 1579106.
- Chen, J.; Matthews, K. S. (1992). "Deletion of lactose repressor carboxyl-terminal domain affects tetramer formation". Journal of Biological Chemistry. 267 (20): 13843–13850. doi:10.1016/S0021-9258(19)49645-2. PMID 1629185.
- Wycuff, Diane R.; Matthews, Kathleen S. (2000). "Generation of an AraC-araBAD Promoter-Regulated T7 Expression System". Analytical Biochemistry. 277 (1): 67–73. doi:10.1006/abio.1999.4385. ISSN 0003-2697. PMID 10610690.
- Wilson, C. J.; Zhan, H.; Swint-Kruse, L.; Matthews, K. S. (2006). "The lactose repressor system: paradigms for regulation, allosteric behavior and protein folding". Cellular and Molecular Life Sciences. 64 (1): 3–16. doi:10.1007/s00018-006-6296-z. ISSN 1420-682X. PMC 11136226. PMID 17103112. S2CID 42030124.
- Liu, Y.; Matthews, K. S.; Bondos, S. E. (2008). "Multiple Intrinsically Disordered Sequences Alter DNA Binding by the Homeodomain of the Drosophila Hox Protein Ultrabithorax". Journal of Biological Chemistry. 283 (30): 20874–20887. doi:10.1074/jbc.M800375200. ISSN 0021-9258. PMC 2475714. PMID 18508761.
- Swint-Kruse, Liskin; Matthews, Kathleen S (2009). "Allostery in the LacI/GalR family: variations on a theme". Current Opinion in Microbiology. 12 (2): 129–137. doi:10.1016/j.mib.2009.01.009. ISSN 1369-5274. PMC 2688824. PMID 19269243.
