= Aquarius Reef Base =

Underwater habitat off Key Largo in the Florida Keys National Marine Sanctuary

Coordinates: 24°57′00″N 80°27′13″W

Florida International University Aquarius Reef Base

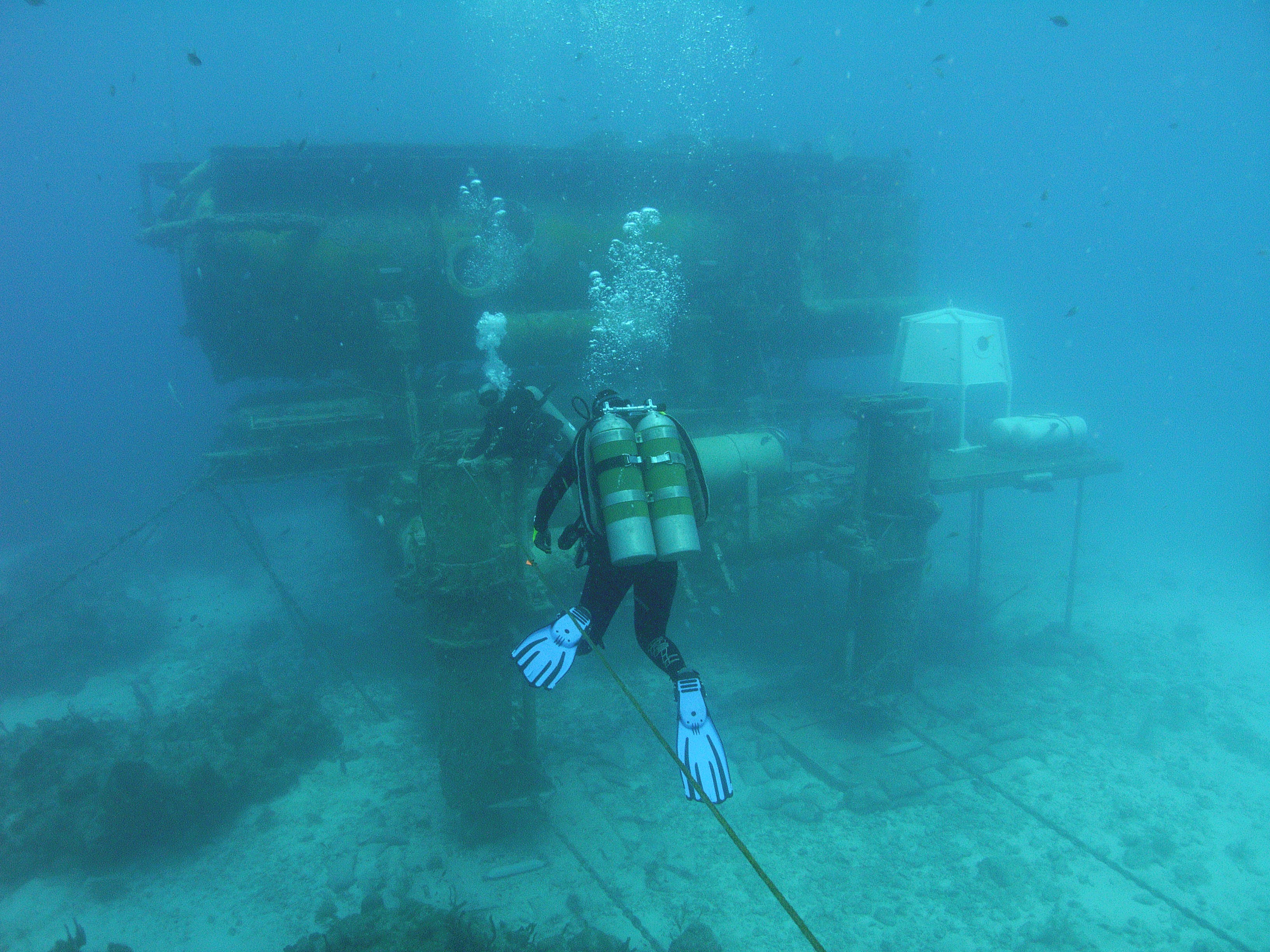
- Aquarius on Conch Reef, off the Florida Keys
- Established: July 23, 1986; 40 years ago
- Research type: Underwater research and ocean exploration
- Location: Florida Keys, Florida
- Operating agency: Florida International University
- Website: aquarius.fiu.edu

The Aquarius Reef Base is an underwater habitat located 5.4 mi (8.7 km) off Key Largo in the Florida Keys National Marine Sanctuary, Florida, United States. It is the world's only undersea research laboratory and it is operated by Florida International University. It is deployed on the ocean floor 62 ft (19 m) below the surface and next to a deep coral reef named Conch Reef.

Aquarius is the only undersea research laboratory currently in operation, although the Marine Resources Development Foundation used to operate two additional undersea facilities, also located in Key Largo, Florida. Aquarius was owned by the National Oceanic and Atmospheric Administration (NOAA) and operated by the University of North Carolina Wilmington until 2013 when Florida International University assumed operational control.

Florida International University (FIU) took ownership of Aquarius in October 2014. As part of the FIU Marine Education and Research Initiative, the Medina Aquarius Program is dedicated to the study and preservation of marine ecosystems worldwide and is enhancing the scope and impact of FIU on research, educational outreach, technology development, and professional training. At the heart of the program is the Aquarius Reef Base.

== Purpose ==
Aquarius, designed by Perry Submarine Builders of Florida and constructed by Victoria Machine Works, was built in Victoria, Texas, in 1986. Its original name was "the George F. Bond", after the United States Navy physician who was the father of SEALAB in particular and saturation diving in general. Underwater operations were first planned for Catalina Island, California, but were moved to the U.S. Virgin Islands. Following Hurricane Hugo in 1989, Aquarius was taken to Wilmington, North Carolina, for repairs and refurbishment and was redeployed in the Florida Keys in 1993. Aquarius is located under 20 m (66 ft) of water at the base of a coral reef within the Florida Keys National Marine Sanctuary, an ideal site for studying the health of sensitive coral reefs.

The laboratory is most often used by marine biologists for whom Aquarius acts as home base as they study the coral reef, the fish and aquatic plants that live nearby and the composition of the surrounding seawater. Aquarius houses sophisticated lab equipment and computers, enabling scientists to perform research and process samples without leaving their underwater facilities.

The habitat accommodates four scientists and two technicians for missions averaging ten days. Scientists on the Aquarius are often called "aquanauts" (as they live underwater at depth pressure for a period equal to or greater than 24 continuous hours without returning to the surface). A technique known as saturation diving allows the aquanauts to live and work underwater for days or weeks at a time. After twenty-four hours underwater at any depth, the human body becomes saturated with dissolved gas. With saturation diving, divers can accurately predict exactly how much time they need to decompress before returning to the surface. This information limits the risk of decompression sickness. By living in the Aquarius habitat and working at the same depth on the ocean floor, Aquarius aquanauts are able to remain underwater for the duration of their mission. In addition, because Aquarius allows saturation diving, dives from the habitat can last for up to nine hours at a time; by comparison, surface dives usually last between one and two hours. These long dive times allow for observation that would not otherwise be possible. Way stations on the reef outside Aquarius allow aquanauts to refill their scuba tanks during dives.

== Habitat structure ==
Aquarius consists of three compartments. Access to the water is made via the wet porch, a chamber equipped with a moon pool, which keeps the air pressure inside the wet porch the same as the water pressure at that depth (ambient pressure), about 2.6 atmospheres, through hydrostatic equilibrium. The main compartment is strong enough, like a submarine, to maintain normal atmospheric pressure; it can also be pressurized to ambient pressure, and is usually held at a pressure in between. The smallest compartment, the Entry Lock, is between the other two and functions as an airlock in which personnel wait while pressure is adjusted to match either the wet porch or the main compartment.

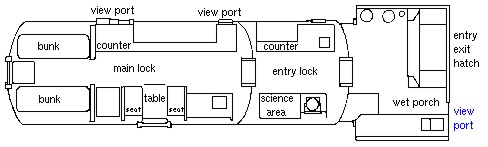
Floorplan of Aquarius.

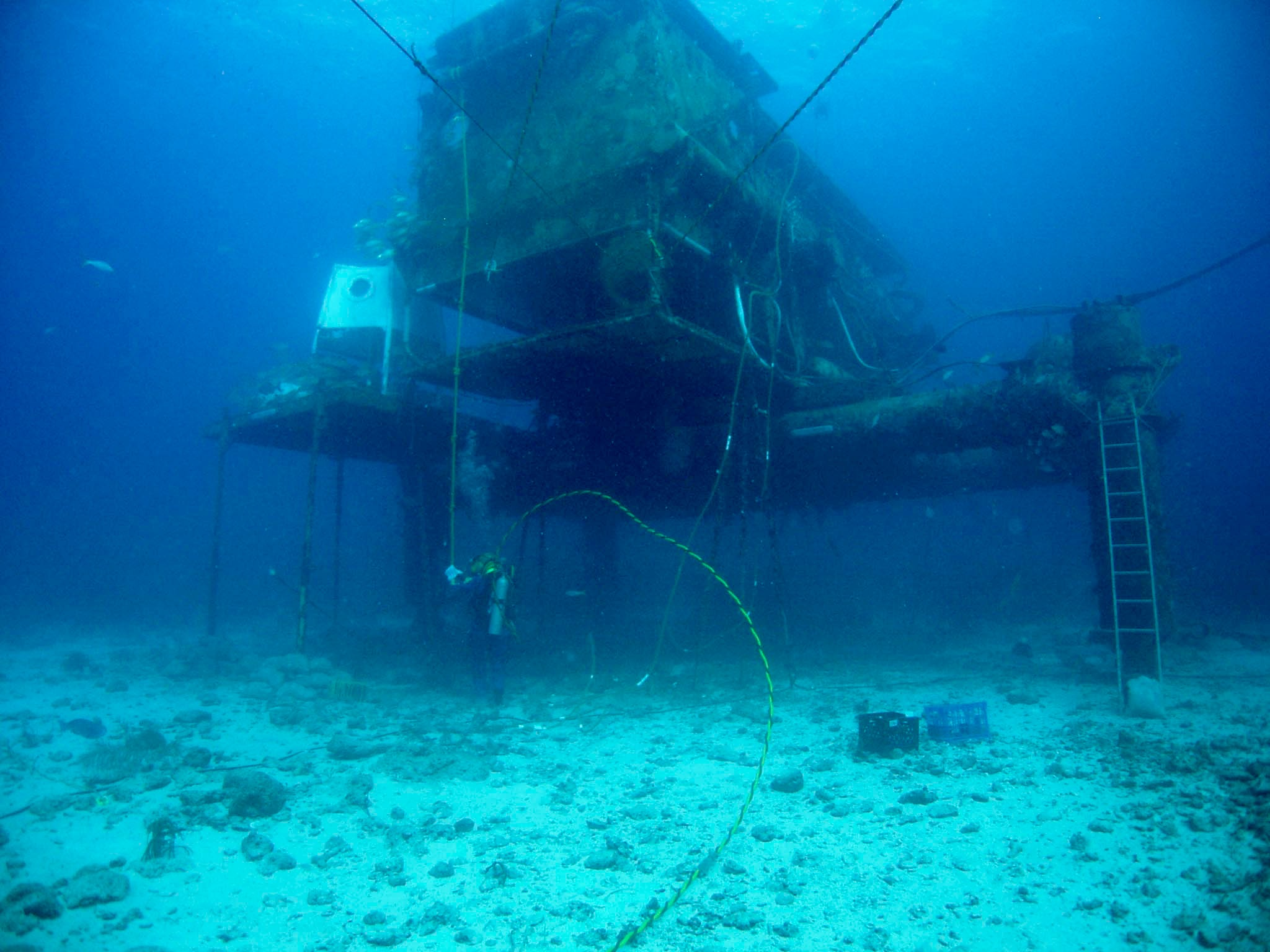
Another view of the habitat

This design enables personnel to return to the surface without the need for a decompression chamber when they get there. Personnel stay inside the main compartment for 17 hours before ascending as the pressure is slowly reduced, so that they do not suffer decompression sickness after the ascent.

== Underwater missions and research ==
Several missions on the Aquarius have been canceled due to hurricane activity. During Hurricane Gordon in 1994, a crew of scientists and divers had to evacuate Aquarius and climb up a rescue line to the surface in 15-foot (4.6 m) seas after one of the habitat's generators caught fire. In 1998, Hurricane Georges nearly destroyed Aquarius, breaking a joint in one of its legs and moving two 8,000-pound (3,600 kg) weights on the wet porch nearly off the structure. Both Hurricane Georges and Hurricane Mitch, later in 1998, also destroyed way stations outside Aquarius used to refill aquanauts' scuba tanks. In 2005, Hurricane Rita broke two of the habitat's seabed anchors and moved one end of Aquarius by twelve feet (3.7 m). In 2017, Hurricane Irma ripped the habitat's 94,000-pound (43,000 kg) life support buoy from its moorings and blew it 14 miles (23 km) away to the Lignum Vitae Channel, as well as damaging the underwater living quarters and wet porch area. As of 2008, no scientists or staff members had been injured at Aquarius due to storms.

Since 2001, NASA has used Aquarius for its NEEMO (NASA Extreme Environment Mission Operations) analog missions, sending groups of astronauts to simulate human spaceflight space exploration missions. Much like space, the undersea world is a hostile, alien place for humans to live. NEEMO crew members experience some of the same challenges there that they would on a distant asteroid, planet or moon. During NEEMO missions in Aquarius, the aquanauts are able to simulate living on a spacecraft and test spacewalk techniques for future space missions. The underwater condition has the additional benefit of allowing NASA to "weight" the aquanauts to simulate different gravity environments.

A diver named Dewey Smith died during a dive from Aquarius in May 2009. A subsequent investigation determined that Smith's death was caused by a combination of factors, including the failure of the electronic functions of his Inspiration closed circuit rebreather due to hydrodynamic forces from a hydraulic impact hammer being used nearby.

Due to budget cuts, NOAA ceased funding Aquarius after September 2012, with no further missions scheduled after a July 2012 mission that included pioneering female diver Sylvia Earle in its aquanaut crew. The University of North Carolina Wilmington was also unable to provide funding to continue operations. The Aquarius Foundation was set up in an attempt to keep Aquarius functioning. In a two-week series, the daily cartoon strip Sherman's Lagoon featured the potential closing of the Aquarius facility in the week starting September 10, 2012, and continued with a cameo appearance of Earle in the week starting September 17, 2012, to discuss the importance of Aquarius. In January 2013, a proposal to keep Aquarius running under Florida International University administration was accepted.

From June 1 to July 2, 2014, Fabien Cousteau and his crew spent 31 days living and working in Aquarius in tribute to Jacques Cousteau's 30-day underwater expedition in 1963. Cousteau estimated the team collected the equivalent of two years' worth of surface diving data during the mission, enough for ten scientific papers.
