= Index of underwater divers =

Alphabetical listing of articles about underwater divers

The following index is provided as an overview of and topical guide to underwater divers:

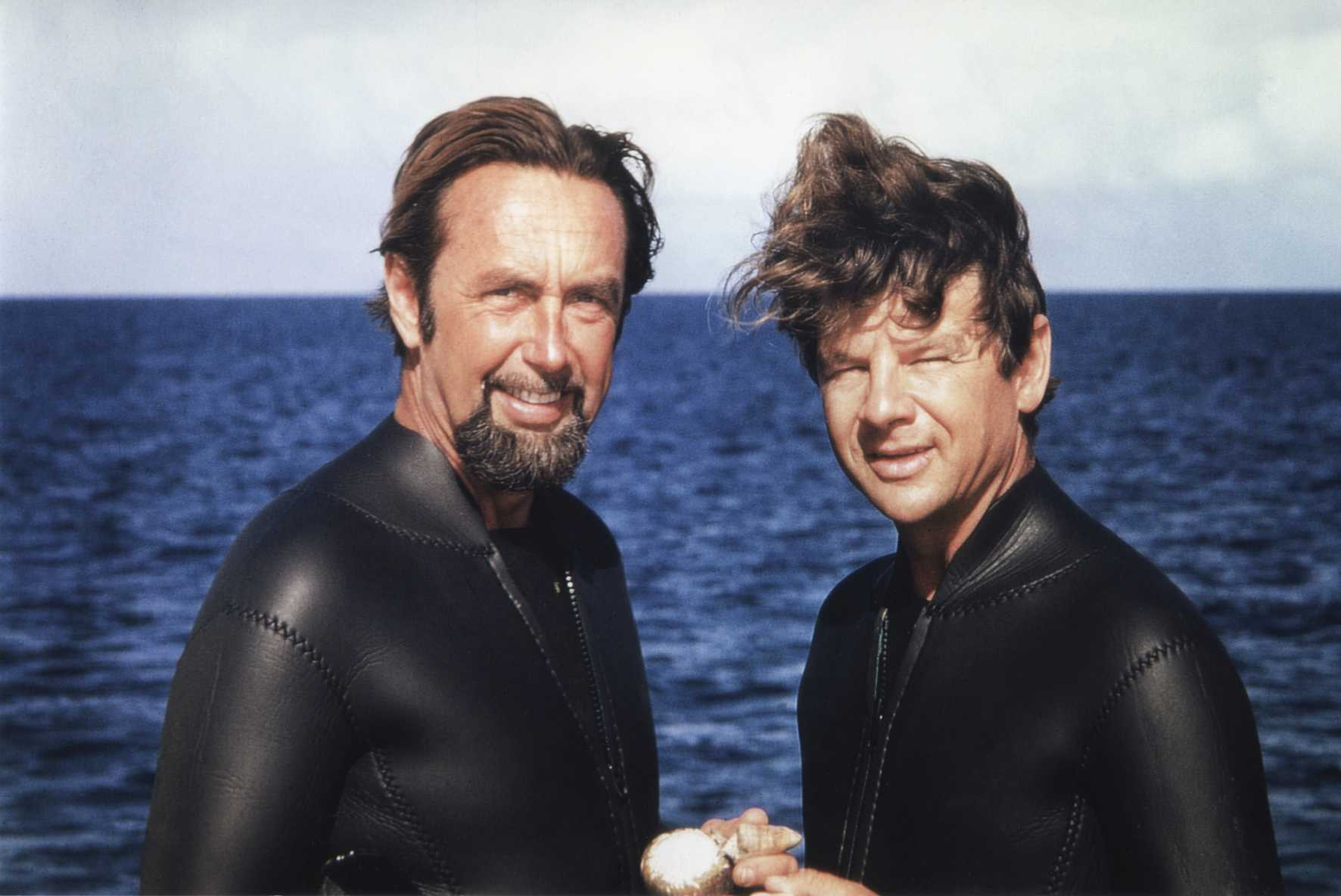
Scientific divers Hans Hass and Irenäus Eibl-Eibesfeldt

Underwater divers are people who take part in underwater diving activities – Underwater diving is practiced as part of an occupation, or for recreation, where the practitioner submerges below the surface of the water or other liquid for a period which may range between seconds to in the order of a day at a time, either exposed to the ambient pressure or isolated by a pressure resistant suit, to interact with the underwater environment for pleasure, competitive sport, or as a means to reach a work site for profit or in the pursuit of knowledge, and may use no equipment at all, or a wide range of equipment which may include breathing apparatus, environmental protective clothing, aids to vision, communication, propulsion, maneuverability, buoyancy and safety equipment, and tools for the task at hand.

This index provides links to Wikipedia articles about people who are notable for some aspect of their underwater diving activity.

== A ==
- Abercromby, Andrew – Biomedical engineer from Scotland working for NASA
- Acaba, Joseph, M. – American hydrogeologist and astronaut (born 1967)
- Admetlla i Lázaro, Eduard – Catalan scuba diving pioneer and underwater filmmaker
- Alhafith, Samir – Australian technical diver, cave explorer and adult underwater filmmaker
- Allum, Ron – Australian submarine designer, cave diver and inventor
- Anderson, Clayton – Retired NASA astronaut and member of the ISS Expedition 15 crew
- Andollo, Deborah – Cuban free diver and diving instructor
- Apperley, David – Australian cave diver
- Arbuthnot, Michael – Underwater archaeologist and film-maker
- Armbruster, Ricardo – Spanish ecologist, adventurer and entrepreneur
- Arnold, Richard R. – American educator and NASA astronaut
- Attenborough, David – British broadcaster and naturalist (born 1926)
- Auñón-Chancellor, Serena – American physician, engineer, and NASA astronaut
- de Ayanz y Beaumont, Jerónimo – Spanish inventor (1553–1613)
- Aytür, Orhan – Turkish professor of optoelectronics and underwater photographer|,}

== B ==
- Balash-Webber, Pamela – American diving instructor and ocean conservationist (1953–2020)
- Baldwin, Carole – Vertebrate Zoology department chair at the National Museum of Natural History
- Baldwin, Roger – Saturation diver killed in accident in the North Sea in 1975
- Ballard, Robert – Retired US Navy officer and professor of oceanography
- Barnette, Michael C. – American underwater diver, author and founder of the Association of Underwater Explorers
- Barratt, Michael – American aerospace medicine physician and astronaut born 1959
- Barth, Robert A. – Pioneering US Navy aquanaut
- Bass, George – American pioneer of underwater archaeology (1932–2021)
- Behnken, Bob – US Air Force officer, NASA astronaut and former Chief of the Astronaut Office (born 1970)
- Amelia Behrens-Furniss – Pioneering American deep-sea diver
- Bellamy, David – English professor, botanist, author, broadcaster and environmental campaigner
- Benitez, Tamara – Filipina cinematographer
- John Bennett (diver) – British technical diver and former record holder lost in commercial diving incident
- Bennett, Peter B. – English medical researcher (1931–2022)
- Berge, Victor – Swedish diving pioneer and author
- Bernabé, Pascal – French claimant to scuba diving depth record
- Beuchat, Georges – French inventor, diver and businessman
- Biddle, Adrian – English cinematographer (1952–2005)
- Bird, Jonathan – American photographer, cinematographer, director and television host
- Biscarini, Peppo – Italian and American swimmer, freediver, and actor
- Bishop, Leigh – Diver known for shipwreck exploration and photography
- Board, Michael – British free diver
- Bonnin, Mary – United States Navy Master Chief, underwater diver
- Bottesini, Enzo – Italian actor and journalist
- Bound, Mensun – British maritime archaeologist
- Bource, Henri – Dutch-Australian scuba diver, underwater filmmaker, musician and shark attack survivor
- Boutan, Louis – French biologist, photographer and zoologist
- Bowden, Jim – Record breaking technical and cave diver
- Bradner, Hugh – American physicist, neoprene wetsuit inventor (1915–2008)
- Bramley, Tony – South Australian scuba diver and environmentalist
- Bravo, Ramón – Mexican diver photographer and underwater filmmaker
- Bresnik, Randolph – United States Marine Corps officer and a NASA astronaut on three expeditions
- Bridge, Allan – American conceptual artist (1945–1995)
- Bridges, Lloyd – American actor (1913–1998)
- Bright, David – Wreck diver
- Broderick, Timothy J. – American surgeon and academic
- Brown, Justin – American professional aquanaut and habitat technician
- Browning, Ricou – American stuntman and filmmaker (1930–2023)
- Bucher, Raimondo – Italian freediver

== C ==
- Cabirol, Joseph-Martin – French engineer and designer of diving equipment
- Cahill, James F. – American scuba diving pioneer (1926–2008)
- Campbell, Sara – British free diver and former world record holder
- Can, Derya – Turkish world record holder female free-diver
- Cannon, Berry L. – American aquanaut who died in a diving incident (1935–1969)
- Carmagnolle, Alphonse and Théodore – French inventors of the first anthropomorphic armoured diving suit
- Carpenter, Scott – American astronaut and aquanaut (1925–2013)
- Cassell, Scott – American underwater filmmaker
- Cavalero, René – French swimmer (1917–2008)
- Challen, Craig – Australian veterinary surgeon and technical diver
- Chamitoff, Gregory – Canadian born engineer and NASA astronaut (born 1962)
- Chappell, Steve – American aerospace engineer
- Chatterton, John – American wreck diver, co-host for History Channel's Deep Sea Detectives series
- Cheng, Eric – Taiwanese American entrepreneur and professional photographer
- Church, Cathy – American marine biologist, diver, photographer and educator
- Clark, Eugenie – American ichthyologist, shark researcher and scientific scuba diver
- Clarke, John R. – American scientist and underwater breathing apparatus authority
- Čolak, Goran – Croatian free-diver and world record holder
- Coleman, Catherine – American astronaut, chemist, engineer and USAF colonel (born 1960)
- Coleman, Neville – Australian naturalist, underwater photographer, writer, publisher and educator
- Charles Condert – Inventor of an unsuccessful early scuba system
- Cook, Robin – American physician and novelist (born 1940)
- Cooper, Craig B. – American aquanaut
- Coste, Carlos B – Venezuelan freediver and world record holder
- Coulson, Cotton – Photographer known for his work for National Geographic magazine
- Cousteau, Fabien – Aquanaut, ocean conservationist, and documentary filmmaker
- Cousteau, Jacques – French naval officer, oceanographer, filmmaker and author (1910-1997)
- Cousteau, Jean-Michel – French oceanographic explorer
- Cousteau, Philippe – French diver and cinematographer (1940–1979)
- Coutinho, Cláudio – Brazilian football manager and coach
- Crabb, Lionel – Royal Navy frogman and MI6 diver
- Craig, John D. – American businessman, writer, soldier, and diver
- Creamer, Timothy – NASA flight director, astronaut and US Army officer
- Frank William Crilley – United States Navy Medal of Honor recipient
- Robert Croft – American freediver and US Navy diving instructor
- Ben Cropp – Australian documentary filmmaker, conservationist and spearfisherman
- Mandy-Rae Cruickshank – Canadian world champion freediver and record holder
- Clive Cussler – American novelist and underwater explorer (1931–2020)

== D ==
- Dalkılıç, Yasemin – Turkish freediver and record holder
- Damant, Guybon Chesney Castell – English physiologist, diver, royal navy officer, and researcher
- Dawson, E. Yale – American botanist and taxonomist
- Day, John – First recorded death in a diving chamber
- Deane, Charles Anthony – Pioneering diving engineer and inventor of a surface supplied diving helmet
- Deans, Billy – American pioneering wreck and technical diver
- de Corlieu, Louis – French naval officer and inventor of the swimfin
- Delamotte, Bernard – French underwater diver and photographer (1939–2023)
- Delgado, James P. – American maritime archaeologist, explorer and author
- Guglielmo de Lorena – Italian inventor of a diving bell used for archaeological work on the Roman ships of lake Nemi
- de Roubaix, Francois – French film score composer
- Denayrouze, Auguste – French inventor of a demand air supply regulator for underwater diving
- D'Imporzano, Leonardo – Italian free-diver and AIDA International Judge
- Diolé, Philippe – French author and undersea explorer
- Dory, Jonathan – Human Systems Integration Lead at NASA's Johnson Space Center
- Doubilet, David – Underwater photographer and author
- Dreyer, Deon – South African diver
- Dufek, Milan – Czech singer, composer and musician
- Dumas, Frédéric – French pioneer of scuba diving (1913–1991)

== E ==
- Earle, Sylvia – American marine biologist and lecturer
- Eberhard, Flavia – Brazilian free-diver and presenter of TV series "APNEIA"
- Eibl-Eibesfeldt, Irenäus – Austrian ethnologist in the field of human ethology (1928–2018)
- Eldred, Ted – Australian inventor of the single hose diving regulator
- Elyatt, Mark – British technical diver and previous depth record holder
- Epps, Jeanette – American aerospace engineer and NASA astronaut born 1970
- Ercümen, Şahika – Turkish dietician and world record holding freediver
- Erken, Birgül – Record-holder Turkish female freediver
- Exley, Sheck – American cave and deep diving pioneer and record breaker

== F ==
- Falco, Albert – French scuba diver, chief diver and captain of the Calypso
- Fardous, Mariam – Saudi doctor, humanitarian and scuba diver
- Fargues, Maurice – French navy diver and first scuba fatality using aqualung for a depth record attempt
- Farr, Martyn – British cave diver
- Farrell, Emma – British freediving instructor and author
- Fernez, Maurice – French inventor and pioneer in underwater breathing apparatus
- Ferraro, Luigi – Officer of the Royal Italian Navy and pioneer of Italian submarine warfare
- Ferreras, Francisco – Cuban freediver also known as "Pipin"
- Feustel, Andrew J. – American-Canadian NASA astronaut and geophysicist
- Fincke, Michael – American astronaut and USAF colonel (born 1967)
- Fine, John Christopher – American marine biologist, wreck diver and author
- Fischer, George R. – American underwater archaeologist
- Fox, Rodney – Australian diver, film maker and conservationist
- Franzén, Anders – Swedish marine technician and amateur naval archaeologist
- Fraser, Ian Edward – Royal Navy Victoria Cross recipient (1920–2008)
- Frazier, Dottie – American diver, designer, and dive shop owner (1922–2022)
- Frazier, Ric – American photographer
- Frink, Stephen – Underwater photographer and publisher
- Frolla, Pierre – Monegasque free-diver and world record holder
- Frost, Honor – Pioneer in underwater archaeology
- Furikawa, Satoshi – Japanese surgeon and astronaut (born 1964)

== G ==
- Gabriel, Elsie – Indian environmentalist and underwater diver
- Gagnan, Émile – French engineer and co-inventor of the open circuit demand scuba regulator
- Garan, Ronald J. Jr. – American astronaut
- Garfella Palmer, Fernando – Spanish documentary filmmaker (1989–2020)
- Garman, Guy – Scuba diver who died in a world record attempt
- Gentile, Gary – American author and pioneering technical diver
- Gernhardt, Michael, J. – NASA astronaut and manager of Environmental Physiology Laboratory (born 1956)
- Gerty, Christopher E. – American aerospace engineer who worked on NASA's Constellation Program
- Gianni, Alberto – Italian underwater diver and inventor
- Gibbins, David – Underwater archaeologist and novelist
- Gilliam, Bret – Pioneering technical diver and author (1951–2023)
- Gilpatric, Guy – American journalist
- Gimbel, Peter – American filmmaker and underwater photojournalist (1927–1987)
- Gomes, Nuno – South African diver and holder of scuba depth record
- Gómez, Sofía – Freediver and civil engineer
- Greatwood, Marcus – British freediving coach
- Grosart, Christine – Cave diver and involved in marine conservation
- Gruber, David – American marine biologist
- Gugen, Oscar – Founder of the British Sub-Aqua Club
- Guiel, Victor F. Jr. – Saturation diver killed in the Wildrake diving accident

== H ==
- Hadfield, Chris – Canadian astronaut (born 1959)
- Hall, David J. – Underwater wildlife photographer, author, and naturalist
- Halley, Edmond – English astronomer (1656–1742)
- Halls, Monty – British TV broadcaster, diver and naturalist
- Halstead, Bob – Underwater photographer, author, journalist and commentator on the recreational diving industry
- Hamerberg, Francis P. – United States Navy Medal of Honor recipient
- Jeremy Hansen – Canadian astronaut (born 1976)
- Harris, Richard – Australian anesthesiologist and cave diver
- Harvey, Guy – Jamaican marine wildlife artist and conservationist
- Hasenmeyer, Jochen – German cave diver and explorer
- Hass, Hans – Austrian biologist, film-maker, and underwater diving pioneer
- Hass, Lotte – Austrian pioneering diver and underwater photographer
- Hauser, Hillary – Journalist, Underwater Diver, Environmentalist
- Hawkes, Graham – British marine engineer and designer of deep submersibles
- Heaney-Grier, Mehgan – American freediver and television personality (born 1977)
- Heinerth, Jill – Canadian diver, writer and underwater filmmaker
- Hernández, José M. – American engineer and former NASA astronaut
- Herrington, John – Native American astronaut, aviator and engineer (born 1958)
- Hill, Paul – Former Director of Mission Operations at the NASA Lyndon B. Johnson Space Center
- Hobbs, Gene – American technical diver and co-founder of the Rubicon Foundation
- Hoffman, Craig M. – Diver killed in the Venture One diving accident
- Holmes, Peter Henry Michael – Saturation diver killed in the Waage Drill II diving accident
- Hosie, Paul – Australian cave diver
- Hoshide, Akihiko – Japanese astronaut and engineer (born 1968)
- Hulsbeck, Mark – American professional aquanaut
- Hwang, Emma – Scientist with Wyle Laboratories and aquanaut on NEEMO 5

== I ==
- Ionescu, Danny – Aquatic microbial ecologist
- Irwin, Steve – Australian zookeeper (1962–2006)

== J ==
- Jablonski, Jarrod – Pioneer American cave diver, author and previous cave diving record holder
- Jackson, Trevor – Australian technical diver and author (born 1965)
- Jarrett, Jim – Test diver of the first successful atmospheric diving suit
- Jessop, Graham – British commercial diver and marine archaeologist
- Jessop, Kieth – British salvage diver and treasure hunter

== K ==
- Kaiser, Henry – American guitarist, film director, and scientific diver
- Kanai, Norishige – Japanese doctor and astronaut (born 1976)
- Karapetyan, Shayarsh – Armenian finswimmer (born 1953)
- Kaufman, Les – American evolutionary ecologist specializing in aquatic ecosystems
- Kelly, Scott – American engineer and politician (born 1964)
- Kendall, Henry Way – American particle physicist who won the Nobel Prize in Physics
- Khvetkevych, Andriy – Ukrainian world-class freediver
- Klingert, Karl Heinrich – German mechanic and inventor of an early surface-supplied diving suit
- Knowles, Sydney – British naval frogman during and after WWII
- Kohanowich, Karen – American aquanaut and ex US Navy diver
- Kohler, Richie – American technical diver and shipwreck historian
- Kopra, Timothy – American astronaut (born 1963)
- Kozłowski, Artur – Polish cave diver (1977–2011)
- Kristoffersen, Elisabeth – Norwegian freediver and president of AIDA Norway
- Kuiter, Rudie Hermann – Dutch-born Australian underwater photographer, taxonomist, and marine biologist
- Kunan, Saman – Thai diver

== L ==
- Landucci, Dominic – American professional aquanaut and Network Analyst at the NOAA Aquarius Reef Base
- Lang, John H. – American soldier and sailor (1899–1970)
- Larn, Richard – British shipwreck historian (born 1931)
- Leferme, Loïc – French freediving record breaker
- Le Prieur, Yves – French naval officer and inventor of a free-flow scuba system
- Lestari, Swietenia Puspa – Indonesian environmentalist
- Lethbridge, John – English wool merchant who invented a diving machine in 1715
- Lewis, Steve – Technical scuba diver and author
- Lindberg, Jon – American underwater diver (1932–2021)
- Link, Edwin Albert – American inventor and underwater diver (1904–1981)
- Link, Edward Clayton – Occupant of crewed sumersible who died in the Johnson Sea Link accident
- Ljungström, Johan Patrik – Swedish jeweler, inventor, and underwater diving pioneer
- López-Alegría, Michael – Spanish-American astronaut (born 1958)
- Luna, Pilar – Mexican underwater archaeologist (1944–2020)

== M ==
- McArthur, K. Megan – American oceanographer and NASA astronaut (born 1971)
- McColl, Kirsty – British singer and songwriter (1959–2000)
- MacInnes, Joseph B. – Canadian physician, author, poet and aquanaut
- McKinley, Craig – Canadian physician and aquanaut
- Mafart, Alain – French military officer convicted for his part in the bombing of the Rainbow Warrior
- Magennis, James Joseph – British military diver
- Magnus, Sandra – American astronaut and engineer (born 1964)
- Main, William Hogarth, also known as Bill Main – Cave diver and scuba configuration experimentalist
- Maiorca, Enzo – Italian free diver
- Marden, Luis – American photographer, explorer, writer, filmmaker, diver, navigator, and linguist
- Marek, Michał – Polish cave diver (1983–2019)
- Marshburn, Thomas – American physician and NASA astronaut
- Marx, Robert F. – American author and scuba diver (1936–2019)
- Mattera, John – American wreck diver and author
- Maurer, Matthias – German astronaut (born 1970)
- Mayol, Jacques – French free diver (1927–2001)
- McCann, Anna Marguerite – American art historian and archaeologist (1933–2017)
- McCartney, Innes – British nautical archaeologist
- Meide, Charles T. – American underwater archaeologist
- Meir, Jessica – American astronaut and marine biologist
- Melchior, Simone – First woman scuba diver and aquanaut (1919–1990)
- Mestre, Audrey – French world record-setting freediver
- Metcalf-Lindenburger, Dorothy – American astronaut
- Nicholas Mevoli – American freediver who died while attempting to set a record (1981–2013)
- Karol Meyer – Brazilian free-diver world record holder and professional cyclist for Avai Cycle Team
- Stéphane Mifsud – French free diver and five time world champion in static apnea
- Mills, Linnea – Diver who drowned during a PADI training dive
- Milowka, Agnes – Australian cave diver
- Mitchell, Simon – New Zealand physician and author on diving medicine
- Mogensen, Andreas – Danish engineer and astronaut (born 1976)
- Molchanov, Alexey – Russian freediver (born 1987)
- Molchanova, Nataia – Russian multiple world record holding freediver (1962–2015)
- Monkman, Noel – New Zealand born Australian filmmaker specialising in underwater photography
- Mount, Tom – Pioneering technical and cave diver (1939–2022)
- Mullins, Dave – New Zealand freediver and world record-holder
- Musimu, Patrick – Belgian freediver

== N ==
- Bill Nagle – American wreck diving pioneer
- Guillaume Néry – French freediver
- Mark M. Newell – British/American underwater and terrestrial archaeologist and anthropologist
- Herbert Nitsch – Austrian freediver and world record holder
- Soichi Noguchi – Japanese astronaut and engineer (born 1965)
- Phil Nuytten – Canadian deep-ocean explorer, scientist, and inventor of the Newtsuit
- Karen Nyberg – American mechanical engineer and NASA astronaut (born 1969)

== O ==
- Lyuba Ognenova-Marinova – Bulgarian underwater archaeologist
- John Peter Oleson – Classical archaeologist and historian of ancient technology
- John D. Olivas – American engineer and a former NASA astronaut
- Takuya Onishi – Japanese astronaut, engineer and pilot (born 1975)

== P ==
- Parish, Steve – British born Australian photographer and publisher
- Parmitano, Luca – Italian astronaut, pilot and engineer (born 1976)
- Parry, Zale – American scuba diver, photographer and actress (born 1933)
- Patrick, Nicholas – British-American astronaut and engineer (born 1964)
- Peake, Tim – British Army Air Corps officer and astronaut (born 1972)
- Pekizzari, Umberto – Italian freediver
- Peress, Joseph Salim – Pioneering British diving engineer
- Pesquet, Thomas – French aerospace engineer, pilot, and astronaut (born 1978)
- Peterson, Mendel L. – American pioneer in the field of underwater archeology
- Petit, Pierre – French photographer (1831–1909)
- Philip, Liv – British freediver
- Pompe, Annelie – Swedish freediver and mountaineer
- Prangley, Gerard Athony – Diver killed in offshore diving bell accident in 1978
- Pyle, Richard – American ichthyologist and scuba diver

== R ==
- Ramsey, Ocean – American freediver and model (born 1987)
- Reagan, Marc – American Station Training Lead in Mission Operations at NASA's Johnson Space Center
- Rechnitzer, Andreas – American oceanographer and scuba diving pioneer
- Reisman, Garrett – American engineer and former NASA astronaut (born 1968)
- Reifenstahl, Leni – German filmmaker (1902–2003)
- Rochat, Lesley – South African underwater photographer, filmmaker and environmental activist
- Rouquayrol, Benoit – French inventor of an early diving demand regulator
- Rouse, Chris and Chrissy – Wreck divers killed in diving accident in 1992
- William R. Royal – American diver who discovered early human remains in Florida
- Rubins, Kathleen – American microbiologist and NASA astronaut
- Rule, Margaret – British archaeologist who led the Mary Rose project
- Rutkowski, Dick – American pioneer in hyperbaric and diving medicine
- Ruttley, Tara – Associate Chief Scientist for Microgravity Research at NASA Headquarters
- Rutzen, Mike – South African conservationist and shark expert (born 1970)

== S ==
- Saint-Jacques, David – Canadian astronaut (born 1970)
- Savoie, Joe – Diver and inventor of diving helmets
- Scarr, Dee – Environmentalist, marine naturalist, and scuba diver
- Schmid, Josef – NASA flight surgeon and Major General in the United States Air Force Reserves
- Schöbel, Gunter – German archaeologist and director of the Pfahlbau Museum Unteruhldingen
- Schwabe, Stephanie – German geomicrobiologist, diver and underwater researcher
- Scoones, Peter – Underwater cameraman
- Searle, Willard Franklin – US Navy ocean engineer and developer of diving and salvage equipment and systems
- Segura, Alex – Freediver from Barcelona
- Serpieri, Claudia – Italian technical diver and depth record holder
- Severinsen, Stig – Danish freediver, record holder and author
- Shaw, Dave – Australian technical diver and former record holder killed in a diving incident
- Sheats, Robert – American Master Diver retired from the United States Navy
- Charles Wesley Shilling – U.S. Navy physician, researcher, and educator
- Siebe, Augustus – British engineer mostly known for his contributions to diving equipment
- Sietas, Tom – German freediver and record holder
- Skerry, Brian – American film producer and photojournalist
- Skiles, Wesley C. – American cave diver and cinematographer
- Skipness, Per – Diver killed in diving bell accident off Norway in 1974
- John Smeaton – British engineer (1724–1792)
- Smith, Dewey – American aquanaut (1972–2009)
- Smith, Gordon – Inventor of KISS diving rebreather, born 1950
- Smyth, Robert John – Diver killed in diving bell accident off Norway in 1974
- Sorenson, Edd – Cave diver from Florida
- Spalding, Charles – Scottish confectioner and amateur diving bell designer
- Spence, E. Lee – Underwater archaeologist
- Starnawski, Krzsztof – Polish technical and cave diver
- Squyres, Steve – Professor of Physical Sciences at Cornell University
- Stanton, Rick – British cave diver who specialises in rescues
- Stefanyshyn-Piper, Heidemarie – American astronaut and Navy captain (born 1963)
- Sténuit, Robert – Belgian journalist, writer and underwater archeologist (1933–2024)
- Štěpánek Martin – Czech freediver and record-holder
- Stevenin, Hervé – European aquanaut at the European Astronaut Centre (born 1962)
- Stewart, Don – American inventor, Bonairean activist, scuba diver and founder of Bonaire Marine Park
- Stewart, Rob – Canadian photographer, filmmaker and shark conservationist
- Steyn, Walter – Australian competitive freediver, freediving judge and freediving instructor
- Stone, William, also known as Bill Stone – American engineer, caver and explorer
- Stott, Nicole – American engineer and former astronaut (born 1962)
- Stover, Albert D. – Diver killed in the Johnson Sea Link accident
- Streeter, Tanya – British-Caymanian-American freediver
- Svensson, Esjorn – Swedish jazz pianist

== T ==
- Tagliabue, Paola – Italian world champion free-diver (born 1976)
- Taillez, Philippe – French pioneer of scuba diving and underwater photographer
- Tani, Daniel M. – American astronaut and engineer (born 1961)
- Talacek, James – American professional aquanaut
- Taylor, Jason deCaires – British sculptor and creator of the world's first underwater sculpture park
- Taylor, Ron – Australian diver and shark cinematographer
- Taylor, Valerie – Australian underwater photographer
- Tesei, Teseo – Italian naval officer and pioneering military diver
- Thirsk, Robert – Canadian engineer, astronaut and physician (born 1953)
- Throckmorton, Peter – American photojournalist and a pioneer underwater archaeologist
- Tillman, Albert – American educator and underwater diver
- Todd, Bill – Project Manager for Exploration Analogs at NASA's Johnson Space Center
- Tors, Ivan – Hungarian playwright, film director, screenwriter, and film and television producer
- Troutt, Kathy – Model, actress, scuba diver and dolphin trainer
- Trubridge, William – New Zealand freediver and record holder
- Truglia, Steve – British stunt performer

== U ==
- Ulusoy, Devrim Cenk – Turkish freediver and world record holder
- Uruk, Fatma – Turkish world record holder female free-diver

== V ==
- Vande Hei, Mark T. – American engineer and NASA astronaut
- van Heest, Valerie – American author, explorer and museum exhibit designer
- Varveri, Danai – Greek freediver and record holder
- Velek, Josef – Czech journalist, author, and environmentalist (1939–1990)
- Veltri, John – American filmmaker and underwater photographer
- Volanthen, John – British volunteer cave diver who specialises in rescues

== W ==
- Wakata, Koichi – Japanese engineer and astronaut (born 1963)
- Walheim, Rex J. – American astronaut, engineer and USAF colonel (born 1962)
- Walker, Richard A. – Diver killed in the Wildrake diving accident
- Walker, Shannon – American scientist and NASA astronaut (born 1965)
- Ward, Lothar Michael – Diver killed in offshore diving bell accident in 1978
- Waterman, Stan – American cinematographer and underwater film producer (1923–2023)
- Watson, Ebenezer – Nephew of Charles Spalding and died in the same accident
- Wedgwood, John – British politician and industrialist
- Wells, John Morgan – Physiologist, aquanaut and researcher (1940–2017)
- Wendler, Joachim – German aquanaut (1939–1975)
- Westell, Bradley – Fatal diving accident in the North Sea in 1995
- Westmorland, Michele – American underwater photographer
- Wheelock, Douglas H. – American engineer and astronaut (born 1960)
- Whitson, Peggy – American astronaut and biochemistry researcher (born 1960)
- Wight, Andrew – Australian screenwriter and producer (1959–2012)
- Williams, Dafydd – Canadian astronaut, physician and public speaker (born 1954)
- Williams, David – American astronaut and US Army officer (born 1958)
- Williams, Sunita – American astronaut and Navy officer (born 1965)
- Williamson, John Ernest – Pioneer underwater photographer
- Wiseman, Gregory Reid. – American astronaut, engineer, and naval aviator (born 1975)
- Worzel, G. Lamar – American geophysicist and underwater photographer

== Y ==
- Yui, Kimiya – Japanese pilot and astronaut (born 1970)

== Z ==
- Zecchini, Alessia – Italian freediver (born 1992)
- Zenato, Cristina – Italian shark diver and conservationist
- Zervoudis, Aristotelis – Greek professional diver (born 1964)
- Zetterström, Arne – Swedish diver and researcher (1917–1945)
- Zharkova, Nataliia – Ukrainian freediver (born 1989)

== See also ==
- Glossary of underwater diving terminology
- Index of underwater diving – Alphabetical listings of underwater diving related topics
