= Outline of underwater divers =

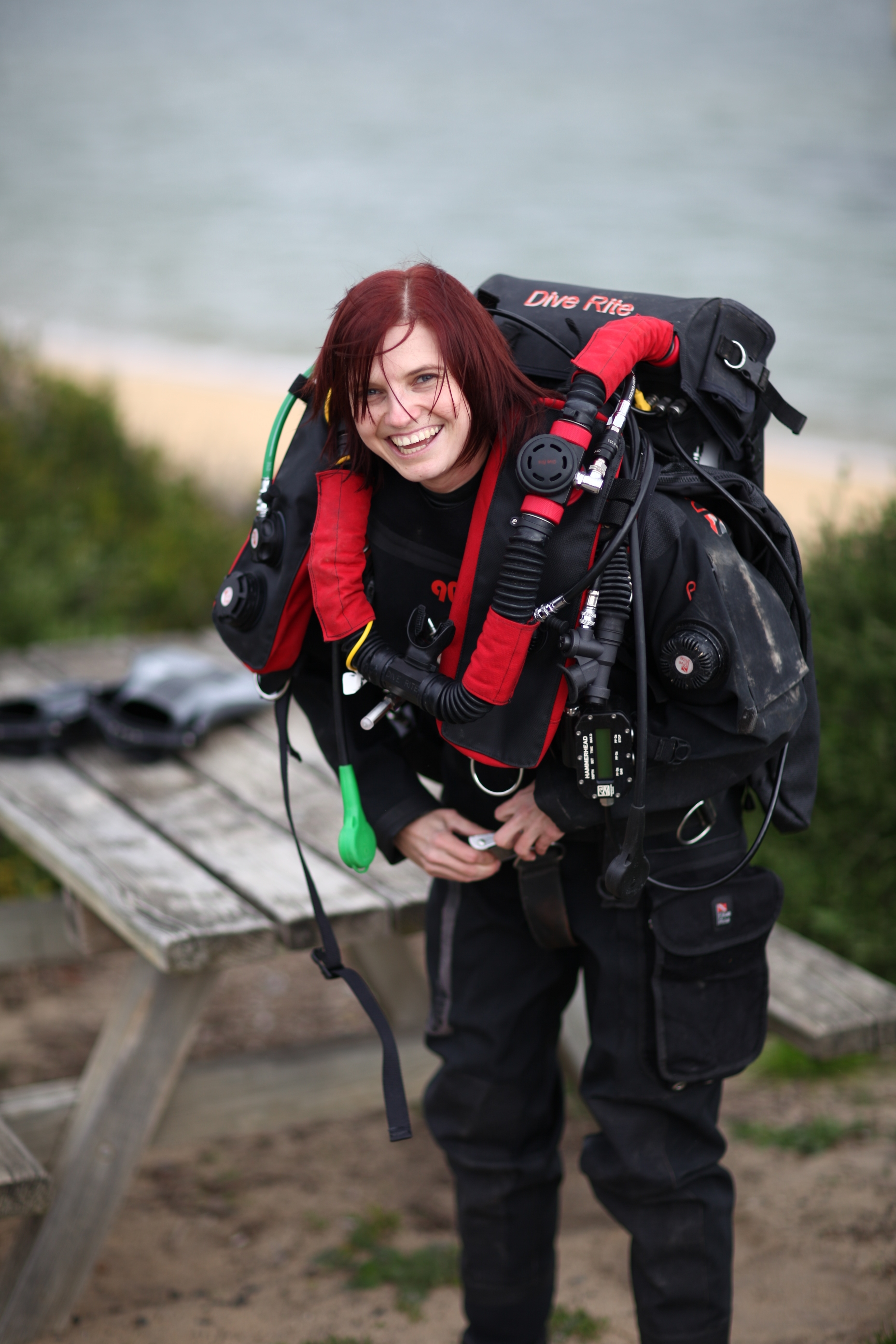
Agnes Milowka

This is a list of underwater divers whose exploits have made them notable. (Note: Notability to qualify for this list is established by having, as a minimum requirement, cited mention in an article on English Wikipedia, in which their notability as a diver is explained.) Underwater divers are people who take part in underwater diving activities – Underwater diving is practiced as part of an occupation, or for recreation, where the practitioner submerges below the surface of the water or other liquid for a period which may range between seconds to order of a day at a time, either exposed to the ambient pressure or isolated by a pressure resistant suit, to interact with the underwater environment for pleasure, competitive sport, or as a means to reach a work site for profit or in the pursuit of knowledge, and may use no equipment at all, or a wide range of equipment which may include breathing apparatus, environmental protective clothing, aids to vision, communication, propulsion, maneuverability, buoyancy and safety equipment, and tools for the task at hand.

== Who is an underwater diver? ==
This list refers to people who are notable for their underwater diving activities and for whom a biographical article exists in Wikipedia. The following lists may also be relevant:

- Index of underwater divers – Alphabetical listing of articles about underwater divers

== Pioneers of diving ==
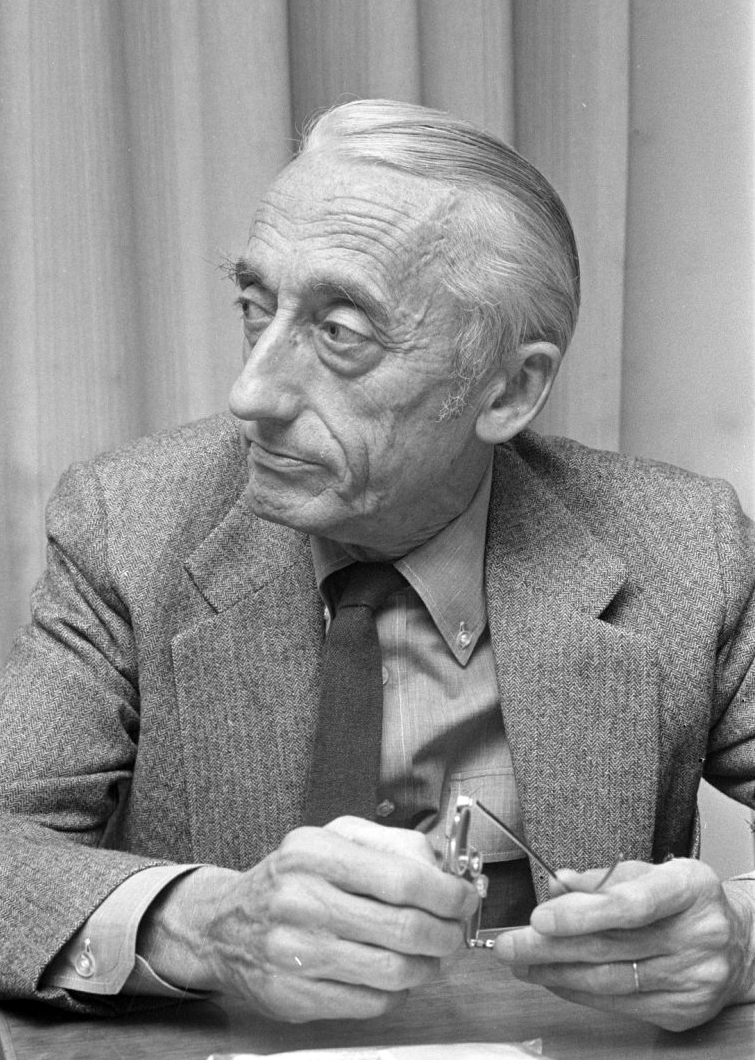
Jacques Cousteau

- Victor Berge – Swedish diving pioneer and author (1891–1974)
- Alberto Gianni – Italian underwater diver and inventor (1891–1930)
- James F. Cahill – American scuba diving pioneer (1926–2008)
- Alphonse and Théodore Carmagnolle – Inventors of an early atmospheric diving suit
- Charles Condert – American inventor of a failed underwater breathing apparatus
- Jacques Cousteau – French oceanographer and author (1910–1997)
- Charles Anthony Deane – English diving engineer and inventor of a surface supplied diving helmet
- Guglielmo de Lorena – Underwater archaeologist who invented a diving bell
- Auguste Denayrouze – French inventor of a demand air supply regulator for underwater diving
- Philippe Diolé – French author and undersea explorer (1908–1977)
- Frédéric Dumas – French pioneer of scuba diving (1913–1991)
- Ted Eldred – Australian inventor of the single hose diving regulator
- Maurice Fernez – French inventor and pioneer in underwater breathing apparatus
- Émile Gagnan – French engineer and co-inventor of the open circuit demand scuba regulator
- Gary Gentile – American author and pioneering technical diver (1946–)
- Bret Gilliam – Pioneering technical diver and author (1951–2023)
- Edmond Halley – English astronomer (1656–1742)
- Hans Hass – Austrian biologist, film-maker, and underwater diving pioneer (1919–2013)
- Stig Insulán – Inventor of an adjustable automatic exhaust valve for variable volume dry suits
- Jim Jarret – Test diver of the first successful atmospheric diving suit
- Yves Le Prieur – French naval officer and inventor of a free-flow scuba system
- John Lethbridge – English wool merchant who invented a diving machine in 1715
- William Hogarth Main – Cave diver and scuba configuration experimentalist
- Tom Mount – Pioneering technical and cave diver (1939–2022)
- Bill Nagle – American wreck diving pioneer (1952–1993) wreck diving
- Phil Nuytten – Canadian deep-ocean explorer, scientist, and inventor of the Newtsuit
- Joseph Salim Peress – Pioneering British diving engineer
- Benoît Rouquayrol – French inventor of an early diving demand regulator
- Dick Rutkowski – American pioneer in hyperbaric and diving medicine
- Joe Savoie – Diver and inventor of diving helmets
- Augustus Siebe – British engineer mostly known for his contributions to diving equipment
- Charles Spalding – Scottish confectioner and amateur diving bell designer
- E. Lee Spence – Underwater archaeologist (1947–)′
- Robert Sténuit – Belgian journalist, writer and underwater archeologist (1933–2024)
- Philippe Tailliez – French pioneer of scuba diving and underwater photographer (1905–2002)
- Teseo Tesei – Italian naval officer and pioneering military diver (1909–1941) inventor of human torpedo
- Arne Zetterström – Swedish diver and researcher (1917–1945)

== Underwater explorers ==
- Craig Challen – Australian veterinary surgeon and technical diver
- Sheck Exley – American cave and deep diving pioneer and record breaker
- Martyn Farr – British cave diver
- Richard Harris – Irish actor and singer (1930–2002)
- Jill Heinerth – Canadian diver, writer and underwater filmmaker
- William Hogarth Main – Cave diver and scuba configuration experimentalist
- Agnes Milowka – Australian cave diver
- Rick Stanton – British cave diver who specialises in rescues
- Bill Stone – American engineer, caver and explorer
- Krzysztof Starnawski – Polish technical and cave diver
- John Volanthen – British volunteer cave diver who specialises in rescues

== Underwater scientists, environmentalists and archaeologists ==
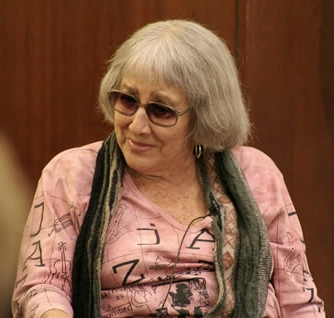
Eugenie Clarke in 2011

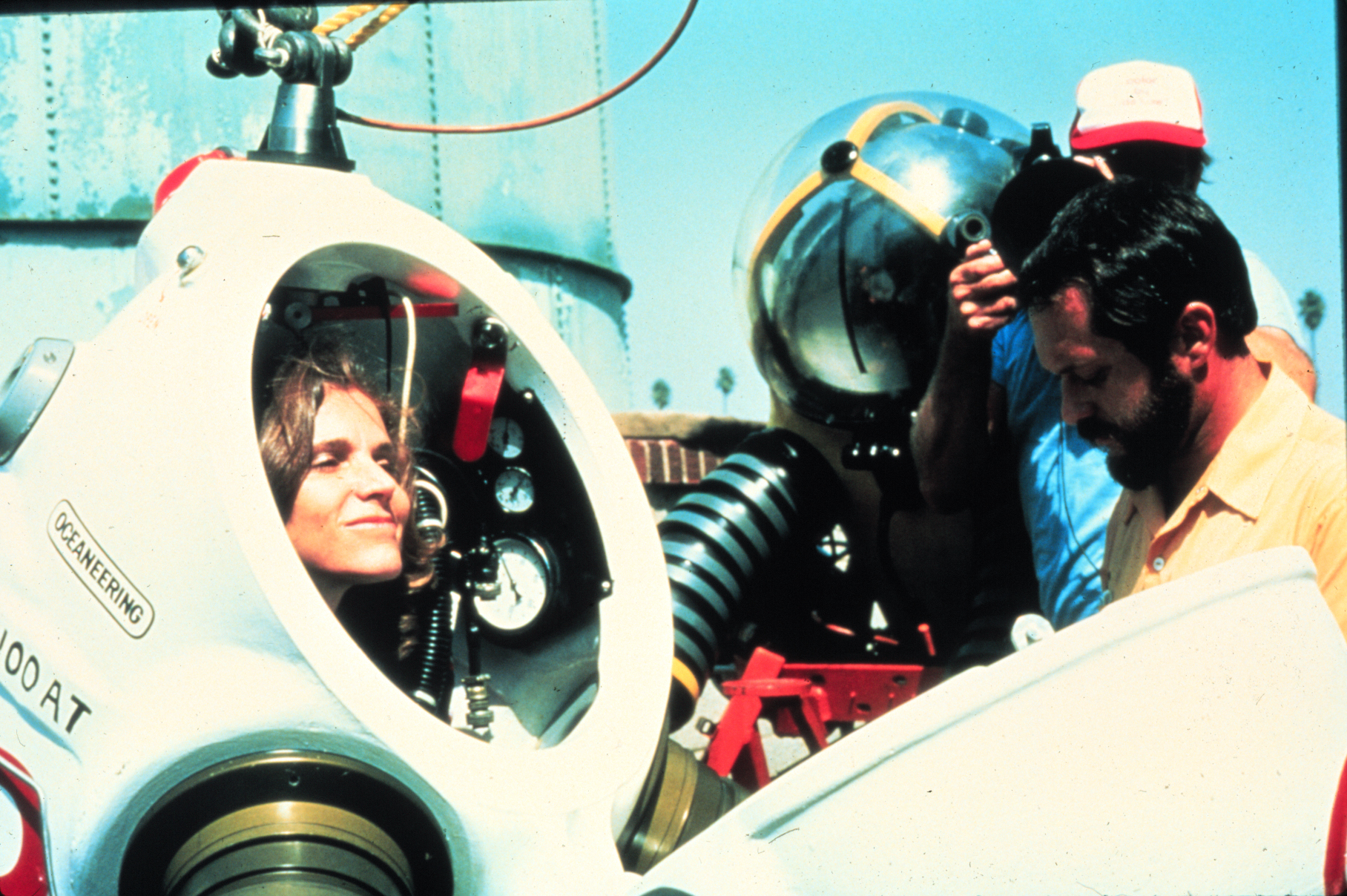
Sylvia Earle prepares to dive in a JIM suit

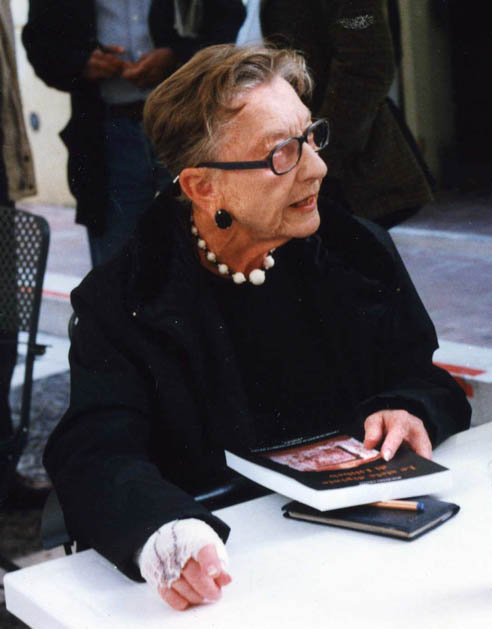
Honor Frost

- Michael Arbuthnot – Underwater archaeologist and film-maker
- Carole Baldwin – Vertebrate Zoology department chair at the National Museum of Natural History
- Robert Ballard – Retired US Navy officer and professor of oceanography (born 1942)
- George Bass – American pioneer of underwater archaeology (1932–2021)
- Mensun Bound – British maritime archaeologist
- Eugenie Clark – American ichthyologist, shark researcher and scientific scuba diver
- James P. Delgado – American maritime archaeologist, explorer and author
- Sylvia Earle – American marine biologist and lecturer
- John Christopher Fine – American marine biologist, wreck diver and author
- George R. Fischer – American underwater archaeologist
- Anders Franzén – Swedish marine technician and amateur naval archaeologist
- Honor Frost – Underwater archaeologist
- David Gibbins – Underwater archaeologist and novelist
- Graham Jessop – British commercial diver and marine archaeologist
- Robert F. Marx – American author and scuba diver (1936–2019)
- Charles T. Meide – American underwater archaeologist
- Simon Mitchell – New Zealand physician and author on diving medicine
- Mark M. Newell – British/American underwater and terrestrial archaeologist and anthropologist
- John Peter Oleson – Classical archaeologist and historian of ancient technology
- Margaret Rule – British archaeologist who led the Mary Rose project
- Dee Scarr – Environmentalist, marine naturalist, and scuba diver
- Gunter Schöbel – German archaeologist and director of the Pfahlbau Museum Unteruhldingen
- Stephanie Schwabe – German geomicrobiologist, diver and underwater researcher
- E. Lee Spence – Underwater archaeologist
- Robert Sténuit – Belgian journalist, writer and underwater archeologist (1933–2024)
- Peter Throckmorton – American photojournalist and a pioneer underwater archaeologist

== Freedivers ==
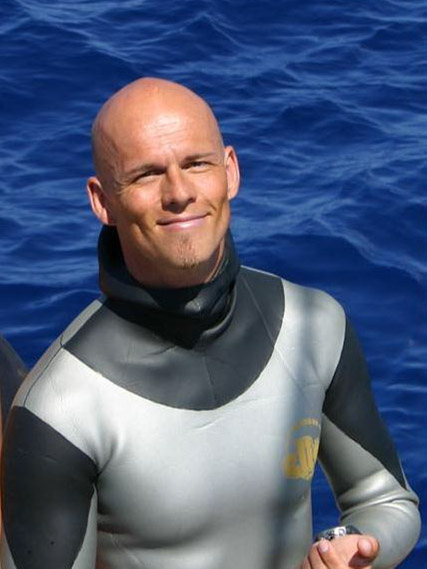
Herbert Nitsch

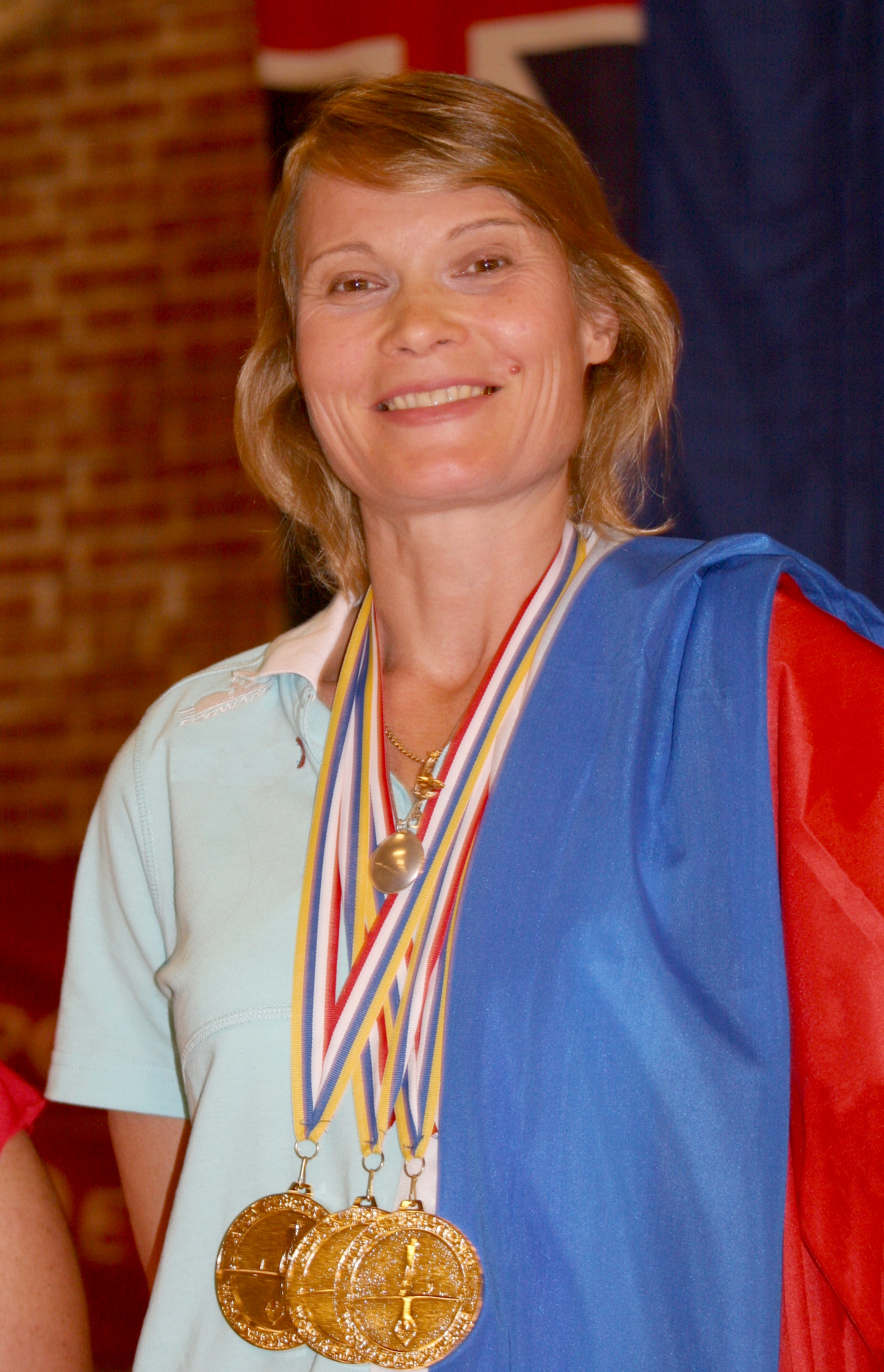
Natalia Molchanova

- Deborah Andollo – Cuban free diver and diving instructor
- Peppo Biscarini – Italian and American swimmer, freediver, and actor
- Sara Campbell – British free diver and former world record holder
- Derya Can – Turkish world record holder female free-diver
- Goran Čolak – Croatian free-diver and world record holder
- Carlos Coste – Venezuelan freediver and world record holder
- Robert Croft – American freediver and US Navy diving instructor (1934–2026))
- Mandy-Rae Cruickshank – Canadian world champion freediver and record holder
- Yasemin Dalkılıç – Turkish freediver and record holder
- Flavia Eberhard – Brazilian free-diver and presenter of TV series "APNEIA"
- Şahika Ercümen – Turkish dietician and world record holding freediver
- Emma Farrell – British freediving instructor and author
- Francisco Ferreras – Cuban freediver also known as "Pipin"
- Pierre Frolla – Monegasque free-diver and world record holder
- Elisabeth Kristoffersen – Norwegian freediver and president of AIDA Norway
- Loïc Leferme – French freediving record breaker
- Enzo Maiorca – Italian free diver
- Jacques Mayol – French free diver (1927–2001)
- Audrey Mestre – French world record-setting freediver
- Karol Meyer – Brazilian free-diver world record holder and professional cyclist for Avai Cycle Team
- Stéphane Mifsud – French free diver and five time world champion in static apnea
- Alexey Molchanov – Russian freediver (born 1987)
- Natalia Molchanova – Russian multiple world record holding freediver (1962–2015)
- Dave Mullins – New Zealand freediver and world record-holder
- Patrick Musimu – Belgian freediver
- Guillaume Néry – French freediver
- Herbert Nitsch – Austrian freediver and world record holder
- Umberto Pelizzari – Italian freediver
- Annelie Pompe – Swedish freediver and mountaineer (born 1981)
- Ocean Ramsey – American freediver and model (born 1987)
- Stig Severinsen – Danish freediver, record holder and author
- Tom Sietas – German freediver and record holder
- Martin Štěpánek – Czech freediver and record-holder
- Walter Steyn – Australian competitive freediver, freediving judge and freediving instructor
- Tanya Streeter – British-Caymanian-American freediver
- William Trubridge – New Zealand freediver and record holder
- Devrim Cenk Ulusoy – Turkish freediver and world record holder
- Danai Varveri – Greek freediver and record holder
- Alessia Zecchini – Italian freediver (born 1992)

== Scuba divers ==
- John Bennett (diver) – British technical diver and former record holder lost in commercial diving incident
- Pascal Bernabé – French claimant to scuba diving depth record
- Jim Bowden (diver) – Record breaking technical and cave diver
- Mark Ellyatt – British technical diver and previous depth record holder
- Sheck Exley – American cave and deep diving pioneer and record breaker
- Nuno Gomes – South African diver and holder of scuba depth record
- Simon Mitchell – New Zealand physician and author on diving medicine
- Claudia Serpieri – Italian technical diver and depth record holder
- Dave Shaw – Australian technical diver (1954–2005)
- Krzysztof Starnawski – Polish technical and cave diver

== Underwater filmmakers ==
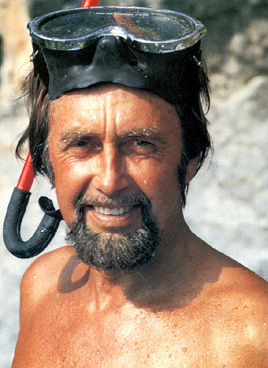
Hans Hass

- Eduard Admetlla i Lázaro – Catalan scuba diving pioneer and underwater filmmaker
- Samir Alhafith – Australian technical diver, cave explorer and adult underwater filmmaker
- Henri Bource – Australian shark attack survivor (1934–1998)
- Scott Cassell – American underwater filmmaker
- Jacques Cousteau – French oceanographer and author (1910–1997)
- Ben Cropp – Australian documentary filmmaker, conservationist and spearfisherman
- Hans Hass – Austrian biologist, film-maker, and underwater diving pioneer
- Jill Heinerth – Canadian diver, writer and underwater filmmaker
- Henry Kaiser (musician) – American guitarist, film director, and scientific diver
- Ron Taylor – Australian diver and shark cinematographer
- Valerie Taylor – Australian underwater photographer
- Stan Waterman – American cinematographer and underwater film producer (1923–2023)
- Andrew Wight – Australian screenwriter and producer (1959–2012)

== Underwater photographers ==
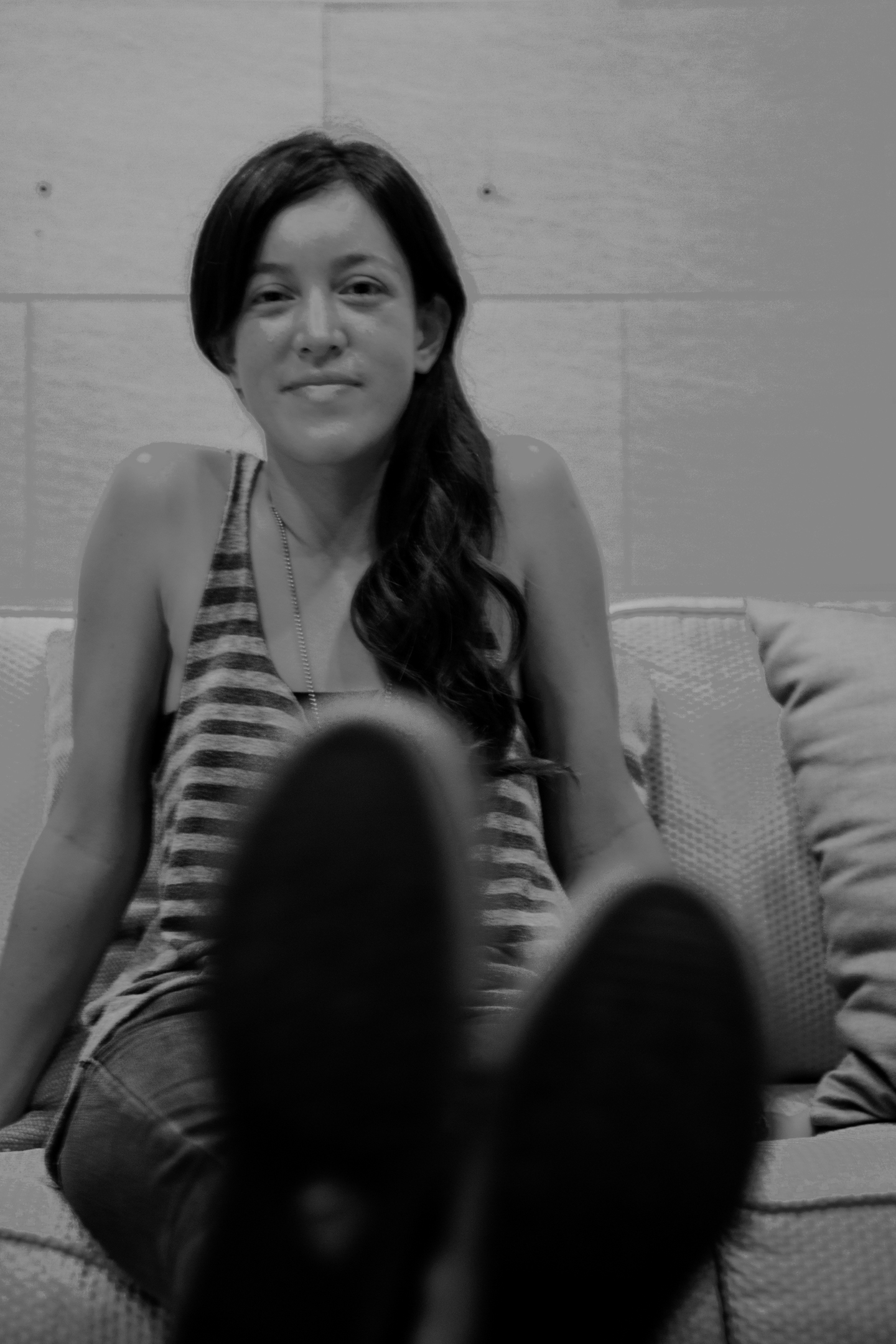
Tamara Benitez

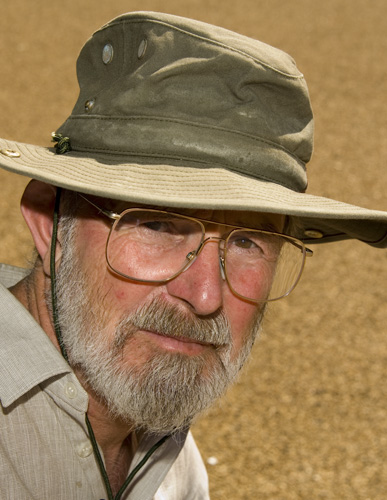
Peter Scoones

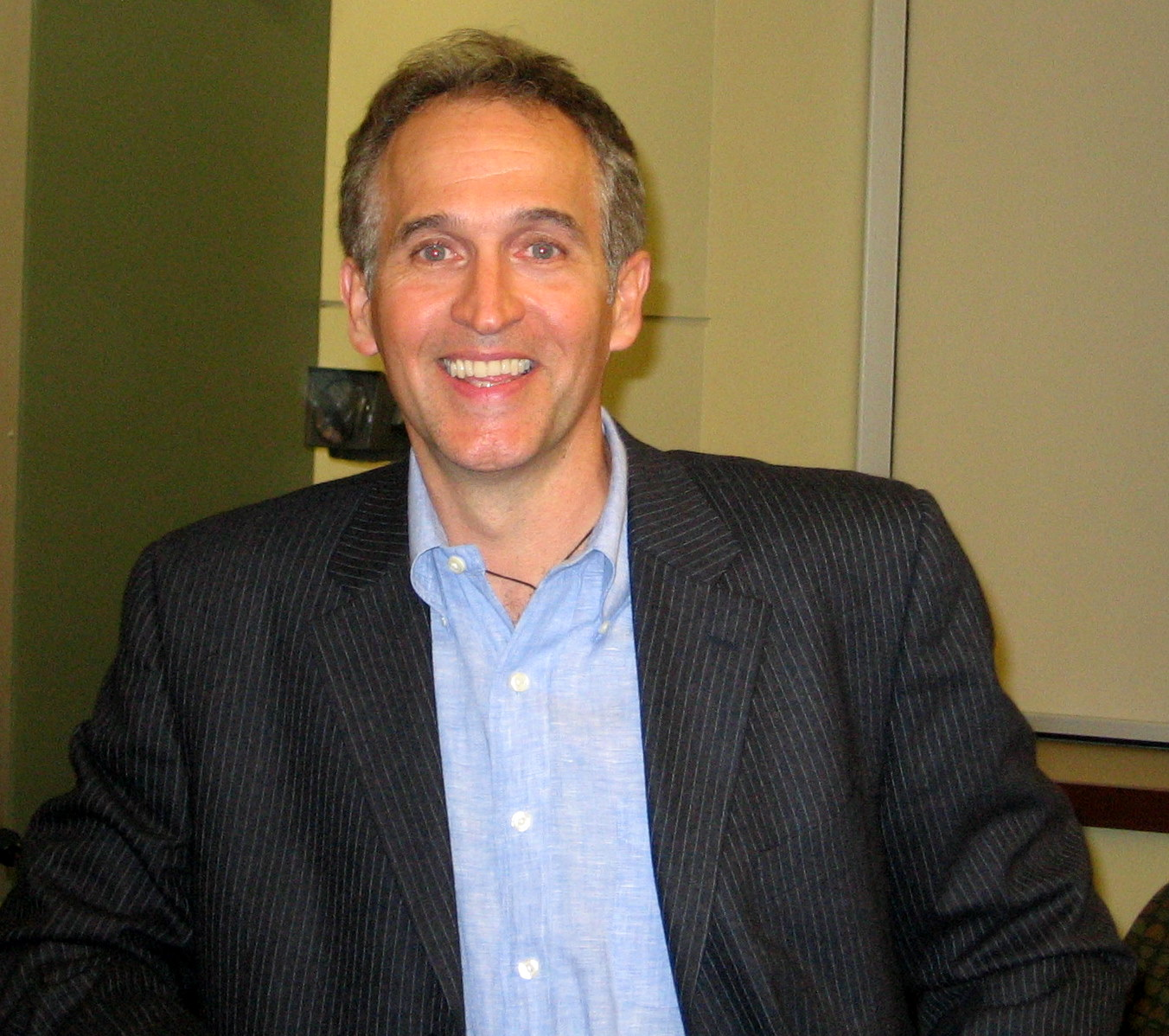
Brian Skerry

- Tamara Benitez – Filipina cinematographer
- Georges Beuchat – French inventor, diver and businessman
- Adrian Biddle – English cinematographer (1952–2005)
- Jonathan Bird – American underwater cinematographer and television host
- Eric Cheng – Taiwanese American entrepreneur and professional photographer
- Neville Coleman – Australian naturalist, underwater photographer, writer, publisher and educator
- Jacques Cousteau – French oceanographer and author (1910–1997)
- John D. Craig – American businessman, writer, soldier, and diver
- Ben Cropp – Australian documentary filmmaker, conservationist and spearfisherman
- Bernard Delemotte – French underwater diver and photographer (1939–2023)
- David Doubilet – Underwater photographer and author
- John Christopher Fine – American marine biologist, wreck diver and author
- Rodney Fox – Australian diver, film maker and conservationist
- Ric Frazier – American photographer
- Stephen Frink – Underwater photographer and publisher
- Peter Gimbel – American filmmaker and underwater photojournalist (1927–1987)
- Monty Halls – British TV broadcaster, diver and naturalist
- Hans Hass – Austrian biologist, film-maker, and underwater diving pioneer
- Henry Way Kendall – American particle physicist who won the Nobel Prize in Physics
- Rudie Hermann Kuiter – Dutch-born Australian underwater photographer, taxonomist, and marine biologist
- Joseph B. MacInnis – Canadian physician, author, poet and aquanaut
- Luis Marden – American photographer, explorer, writer, filmmaker, diver, navigator, and linguist
- Agnes Milowka – Australian cave diver
- Bruce Mozert – American photographer
- Noel Monkman – New Zealand born Australian filmmaker specialising in underwater photography
- Steve Parish (photographer) – British born Australian photographer and publisher
- Zale Parry – American scuba diver, photographer and actress (born 1933)
- Pierre Petit – French photographer (1831–1909)
- Leni Riefenstahl – German filmmaker (1902–2003)
- Peter Scoones – Underwater cameraman
- Brian Skerry – American film producer and photojournalist
- Wesley C. Skiles – American cave diver and cinematographer
- E. Lee Spence – Underwater archaeologist
- Philippe Tailliez – French pioneer of scuba diving and underwater photographer
- Ron Taylor – Australian diver and shark cinematographer
- Valerie Taylor – Australian underwater photographer
- Albert Tillman – American educator and underwater diver
- John Veltri – American filmmaker and underwater photographer
- Stan Waterman – American cinematographer and underwater film producer (1923–2023)
- Michele Westmorland – American underwater photographer
- J. Lamar Worzel – American geophysicist and underwater photographer

== Underwater artists ==
Christ of the Abyss at San Fruttuoso, Liguria

- Jason deCaires Taylor – British sculptor and creator of the world's first underwater sculpture park

== Combat divers, frogmen and saboteurs ==
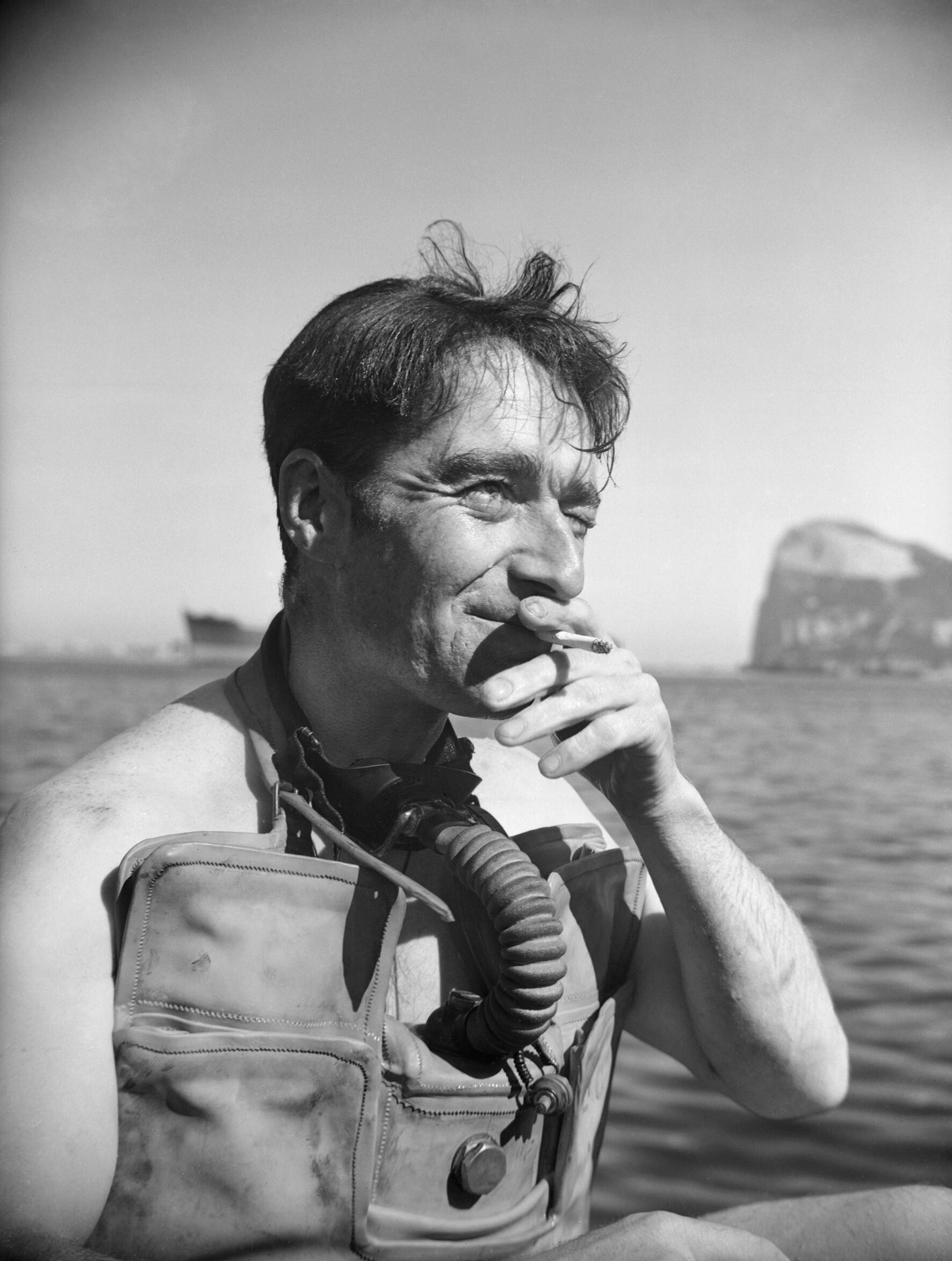
Lionel Crabb

- Lionel Crabb – Royal Navy frogman and MI6 diver
- Ian Edward Fraser – Royal Navy Victoria Cross recipient (1920–2008)
- Sydney Knowles – British naval frogman during and after WWII
- John H. Lang – American soldier and sailor (1899–1970)
- Alain Mafart – French military officer convicted for his part in the bombing of the Rainbow Warrior
- Teseo Tesei – Italian naval officer and pioneering military diver

== Aquanauts ==
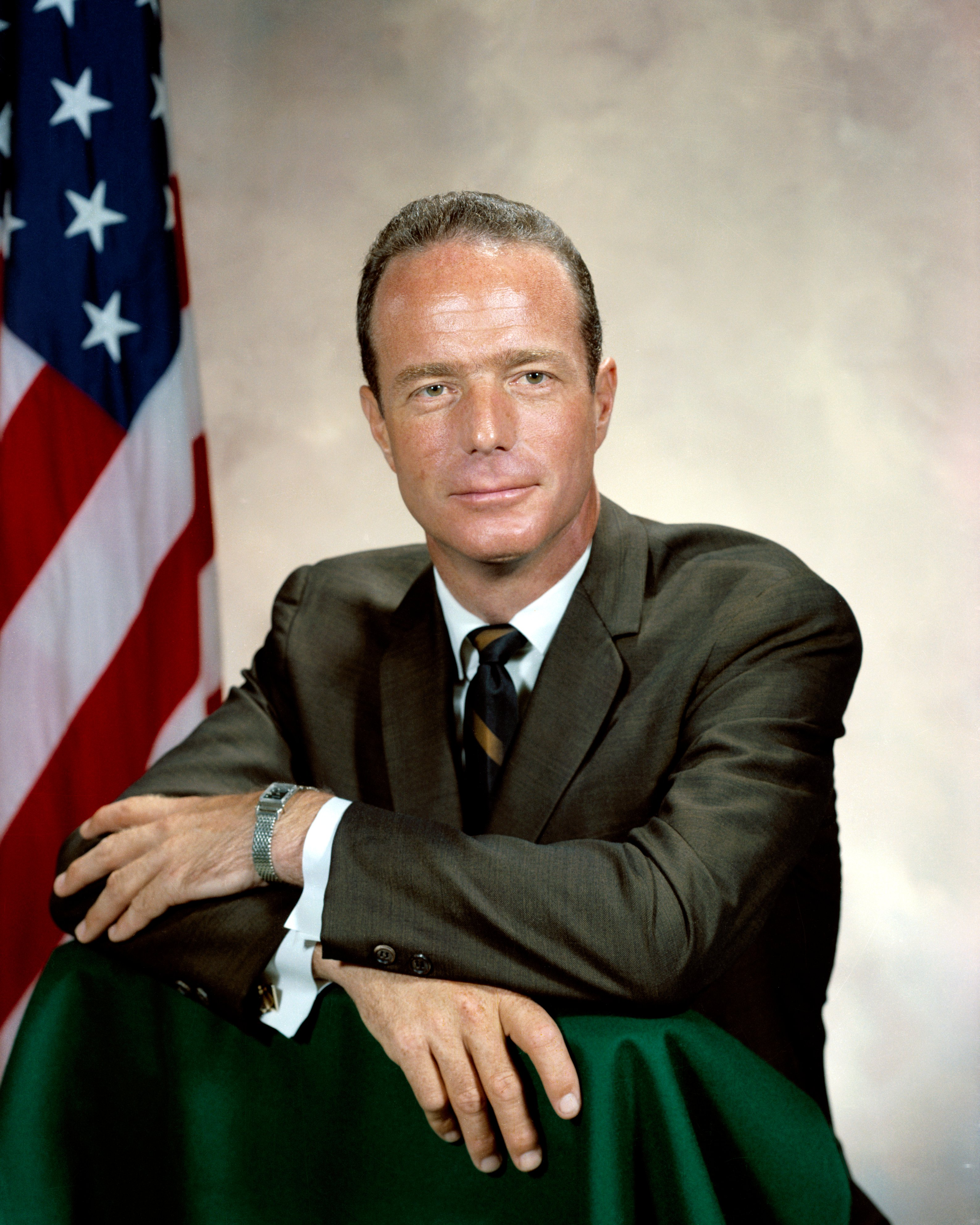
Scott Carpenter

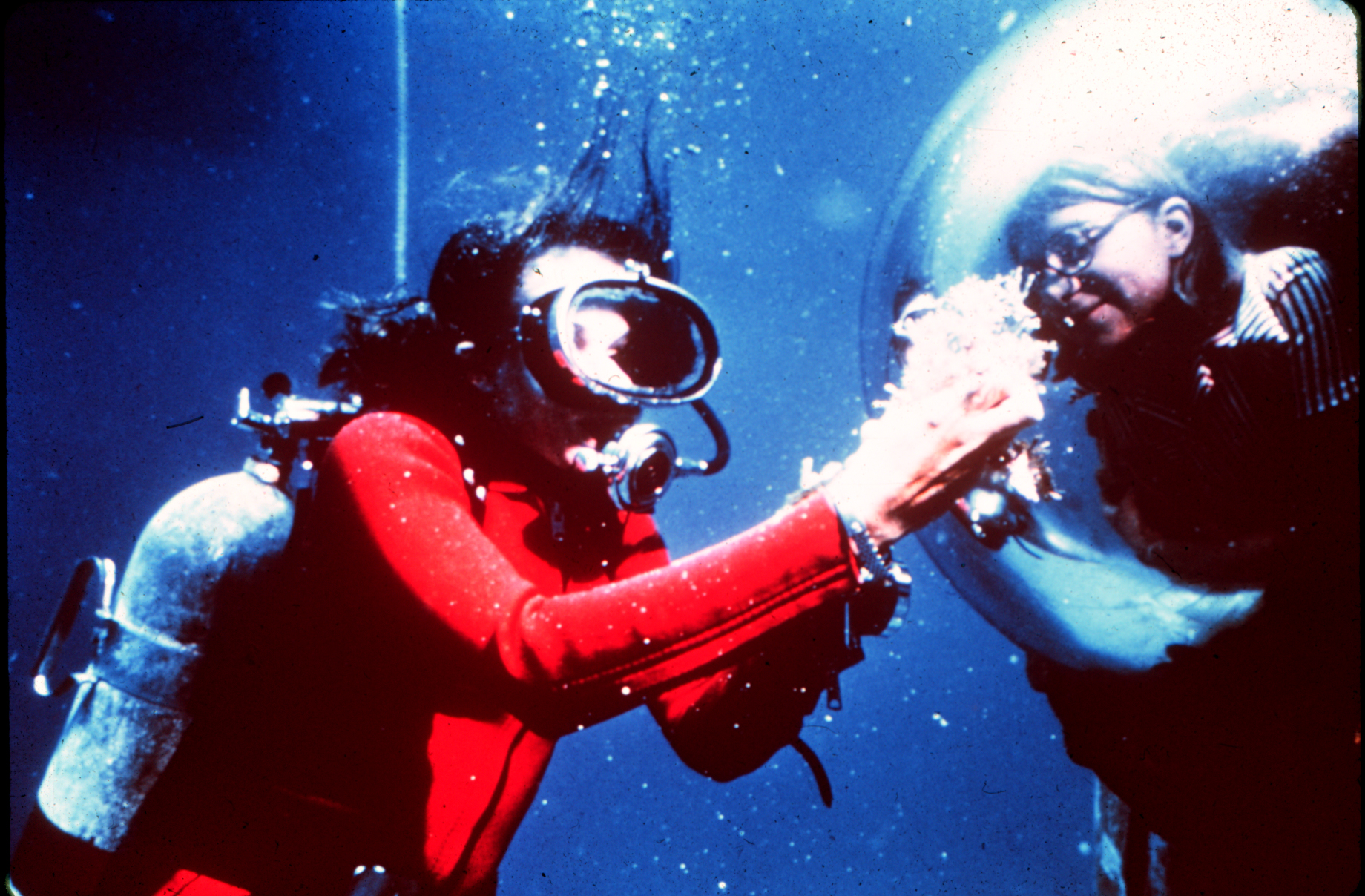
Sylvia Earle displays samples to aquanaut inside TEKTITE

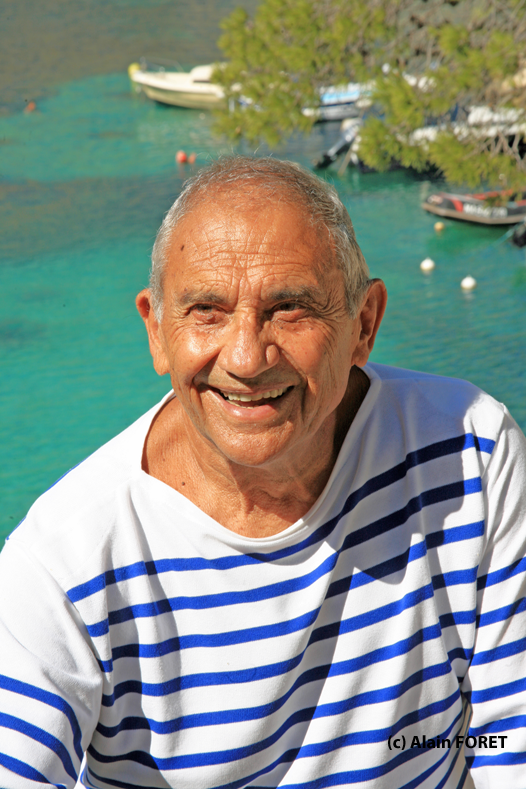
Albert Falco in 2011

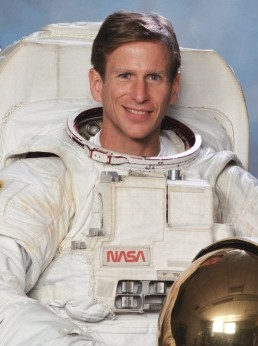
Michael Gernhardt

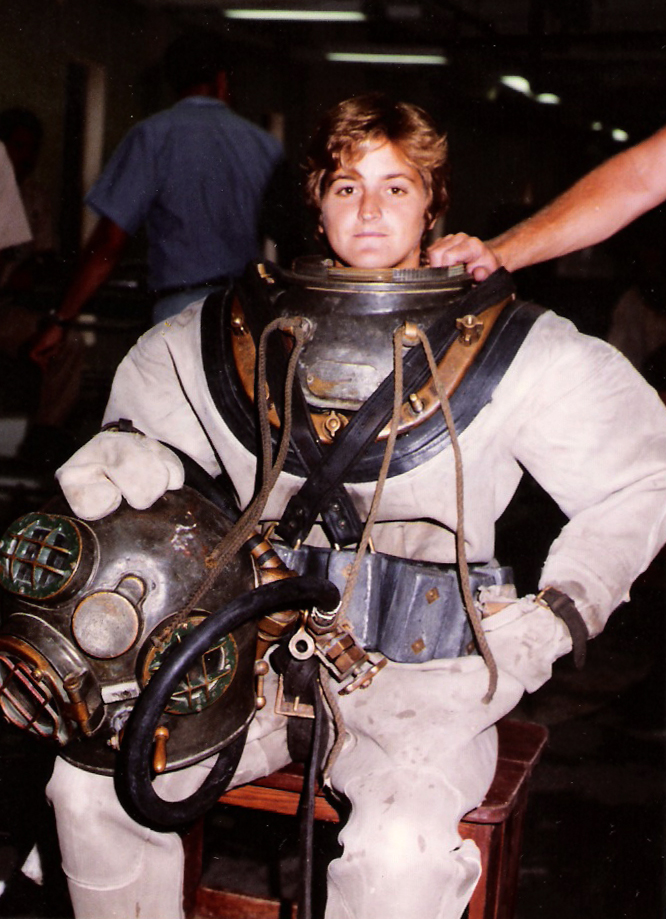
Karen Kohanowich

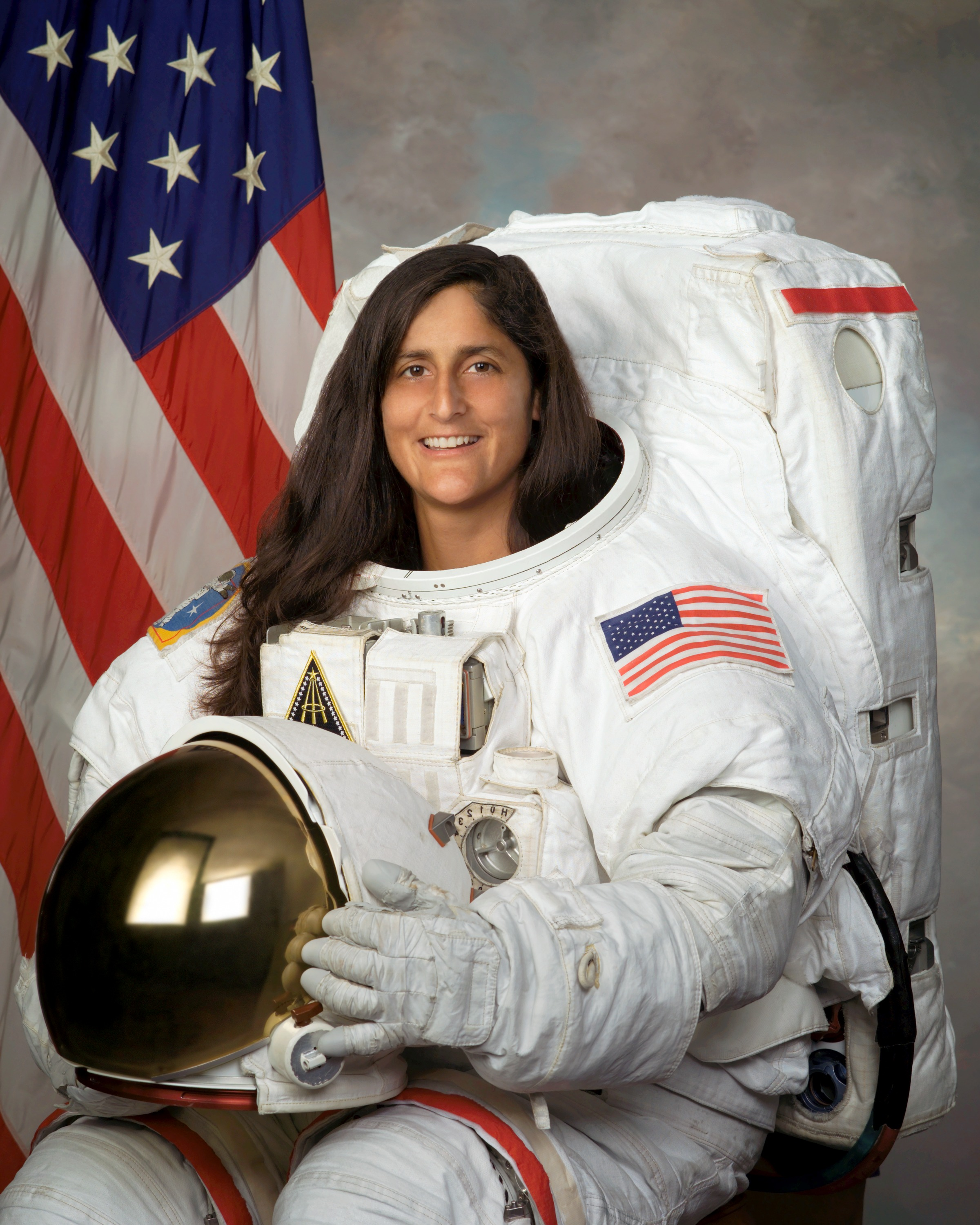
Sunita Williams

Aquanaut – Diver who remains at depth underwater for longer than 24 hours

- Astronauts – Spacecraft crew member
  - Joseph M. Acaba – American hydrogeologist and astronaut (born 1967)
  - Clayton Anderson – Retired NASA astronaut and member of the ISS Expedition 15 crew
  - Richard R. Arnold – American educator and NASA astronaut
  - Serena Auñón-Chancellor – American physician, engineer, and NASA astronaut
  - Michael Barratt (astronaut) – American aerospace medicine physician and astronaut born 1959
  - Bob Behnken – US Air Force officer, NASA astronaut and former Chief of the Astronaut Office (born 1970)
  - Randolph Bresnik – United States Marine Corps officer and a NASA astronaut on three expeditions
  - Scott Carpenter – American astronaut and aquanaut (1925–2013)
  - Gregory Chamitoff – Canadian born engineer and NASA astronaut (born 1962)
  - Catherine Coleman – American astronaut, chemist, engineer and USAF colonel (born 1960)
  - Timothy Creamer – NASA flight director, astronaut and US Army officer
  - Jeanette Epps – American aerospace engineer and NASA astronaut born 1970
  - Andrew J. Feustel – American-Canadian NASA astronaut and geophysicist
  - Michael Fincke – American astronaut and USAF colonel (born 1967)
  - Satoshi Furukawa – Japanese surgeon and astronaut (born 1964)
  - Ronald J. Garan Jr. – American astronaut
  - Michael L. Gernhardt – NASA astronaut and manager of Environmental Physiology Laboratory (born 1956)
  - Chris Hadfield – Canadian astronaut (born 1959)
  - Jeremy Hansen – Canadian astronaut (born 1976)
  - José M. Hernández – American engineer and former NASA astronaut
  - John Herrington – Native American astronaut, aviator and engineer (born 1958)
  - Akihiko Hoshide – Japanese astronaut and engineer (born 1968)
  - Norishige Kanai – Japanese doctor and astronaut (born 1976)
  - Scott Kelly (astronaut) – American engineer, astronaut, and naval aviator (born 1964)
  - Timothy Kopra – American astronaut (born 1963)
  - Michael López-Alegría – Spanish-American astronaut (born 1958)
  - Sandra Magnus – American astronaut and engineer (born 1964)
  - Thomas Marshburn – American physician and NASA astronaut
  - K. Megan McArthur – American oceanographer and NASA astronaut (born 1971)
  - Jessica Meir – Swedish American marine biologist and NASA astronaut
  - Dorothy Metcalf-Lindenburger – American astronaut
  - Andreas Mogensen – Danish engineer and astronaut (born 1976)
  - Soichi Noguchi – Japanese astronaut and engineer (born 1965)
  - Karen Nyberg – American mechanical engineer and NASA astronaut (born 1969)
  - John D. Olivas – American engineer and a former NASA astronaut
  - Takuya Onishi – Japanese astronaut, engineer and pilot (born 1975)
  - Luca Parmitano – Italian astronaut, pilot and engineer (born 1976)
  - Nicholas Patrick – British-American astronaut and engineer (born 1964)
  - Tim Peake – British Army Air Corps officer and astronaut (born 1972)
  - Thomas Pesquet – French aerospace engineer, pilot, and astronaut
  - Marc Reagan – American Station Training Lead in Mission Operations at NASA's Johnson Space Center
  - Garrett Reisman – American engineer and former NASA astronaut (born 1968)
  - Kathleen Rubins – American microbiologist and NASA astronaut
  - David Saint-Jacques – Canadian astronaut (born 1970)
  - Heidemarie Stefanyshyn-Piper – American astronaut and Navy captain (born 1963)
  - Hervé Stevenin – European aquanaut at the European Astronaut Centre (born 1962)
  - Nicole Stott – American engineer and former astronaut (born 1962)
  - Daniel M. Tani – American astronaut and engineer (born 1961)
  - Robert Thirsk – Canadian engineer, astronaut and physician (born 1953)
  - Bill Todd – Project Manager for Exploration Analogs at NASA's Johnson Space Center
  - Mark T. Vande Hei – American engineer and NASA astronaut
  - Koichi Wakata – Japanese engineer and astronaut (born 1963)
  - Rex J. Walheim – American astronaut, engineer and USAF colonel (born 1962)
  - Shannon Walker – American scientist and NASA astronaut (born 1965)
  - Douglas H. Wheelock – American engineer and astronaut (born 1960)
  - Peggy Whitson – American astronaut and biochemistry researcher (born 1960)
  - Dafydd Williams – Canadian astronaut, physician and public speaker (born 1954)
  - Jeffrey Williams (astronaut) – American astronaut and US Army officer (born 1958)
  - Sunita Williams – U.S. Navy officer and NASA astronaut (born 1965)
  - Reid Wiseman – American aviator and astronaut (born 1975)
  - Kimiya Yui – Japanese pilot and astronaut (born 1970)
- Andrew Abercromby – Biomedical engineer from Scotland working for NASA
- Timothy J. Broderick – American surgeon and academic
- Berry L. Cannon – American aquanaut who died in a diving incident (1935–1969)
- Justin Brown (aquanaut) – American professional aquanaut and habitat technician
- Steve Chappell – American aerospace engineer (born 1969/1970)
- Robin Cook (American novelist) – American physician and novelist (born 1940)
- Craig B. Cooper – American aquanaut
- Fabien Cousteau – Aquanaut, ocean conservationist, and documentary filmmaker
- Philippe Cousteau – French diver and cinematographer (1940–1979)
- Jonathan Dory – Human Systems Integration Lead at NASA's Johnson Space Center
- Sylvia Earle – American marine biologist and lecturer
- Sheck Exley – American cave and deep diving pioneer and record breaker
- Albert Falco – French scuba diver, chief diver and captain of the Calypso
- Christopher E. Gerty – American aerospace engineer who worked on NASA's Constellation Program
- Paul Hill (flight director) – Former Director of Mission Operations at the NASA Lyndon B. Johnson Space Center
- Mark Hulsbeck – American professional aquanaut
- Emma Hwang – Scientist with Wyle Laboratories and aquanaut on NEEMO 5
- Les Kaufman – American evolutionary ecologist specializing in aquatic ecosystems
- Karen Kohanowich – American aquanaut and ex US Navy diver
- Dominic Landucci – American professional aquanaut and Network Analyst at the NOAA Aquarius Reef Base
- Jon Lindbergh – American underwater diver (1932–2021)
- Joseph B. MacInnis – Canadian physician, author, poet and aquanaut
- Craig McKinley (physician) – Canadian physician and aquanaut
- Simone Melchior – First woman scuba diver and aquanaut (1919–1990)
- Dick Rutkowski – American pioneer in hyperbaric and diving medicine
- Tara Ruttley – Associate Chief Scientist for Microgravity Research at NASA Headquarters
- Josef Schmid (flight surgeon) – NASA flight surgeon and Major General in the United States Air Force Reserves
- Robert Sheats – American Master Diver retired from the United States Navy
- Dewey Smith – American aquanaut (1972–2009)
- Steve Squyres – Professor of Physical Sciences at Cornell University
- Robert Sténuit – Belgian journalist, writer and underwater archeologist (1933–2024)
- James Talacek – American professional aquanaut
- Joachim Wendler – German aquanaut (1939–1975)

== Cave divers ==
- Graham Balcombe – Pioneering British cave diver (1907–2000)
- Jon Lindbergh – Pioneering American cave diver and early aquanaut (1932–2021)
- Jim Bowden – Record breaking technical and cave diver
- Sheck Exley – American cave and deep diving pioneer and record breaker (1949–1994)
- Martyn Farr – British cave diver (1951–)
- Jarrod Jablonski – Pioneer American cave diver, author and previous cave diving record holder (1969–)
- Artur Kozłowski – Polish cave diver (1977–2011) (1977–2011)
- Jack Sheppard – British cave diver (1909–2001)
- Wesley C. Skiles – American cave diver and cinematographer (1958–2010)
- Krzysztof Starnawski – Polish technical and cave diver
- Rick Stanton – British cave diver who specialises in rescues (1961–)
- John Volanthen – British volunteer cave diver who specialises in rescues (1971–)

== Notable for other reasons ==
(to be allocated)

- Michael C. Barnette – American underwater diver, writer and founder of the Association of Underwater Explorers (born 1971)
- Leigh Bishop – Diver known for shipwreck exploration and photography (shipwreck discovery)
- John Chatterton – American wreck diver, co-host for History Channel's Deep Sea Detectives series(shipwreck discovery)
- Jean-Michel Cousteau – French oceanographic explorer
- Billy Deans (diver) – American pioneering wreck and technical diver
- Leonardo D'Imporzano – Italian free-diver and AIDA International Judge
- Deon Dreyer – South African diver (1974–1994)
- Oscar Gugen – Founder of the British Sub-Aqua Club
- Bob Halstead – British scuba diver (1944–2018)
- Mehgan Heaney-Grier – American freediver and television personality (born 1977)
- Paul Hosie – Australian cave diver
- Keith Jessop – British salvage diver and treasure hunter
- Richie Kohler – American technical diver and shipwreck historian
- Steve Lewis (diver) – Technical scuba diver and author
- John Mattera – American wreck diver and author (shipwreck discovery)
- Lesley Rochat – South African underwater photographer, filmmaker and environmental activist
- Willard Franklyn Searle – US Navy ocean engineer and developer of diving and salvage equipment and systems
- Bill Nagle – American wreck diving pioneer
- Aristotelis Zervoudis – Greek professional diver (born 1964)

== See also ==
- Glossary of underwater diving terminology
- Outline of underwater diving – List of articles related to underwater diving grouped by topical relevance
- Index of underwater divers – Alphabetical listing of articles about underwater divers
- Index of underwater diving: A–M
- Index of underwater diving: N–Z – Alphabetic listing of project articles
- Index of recreational dive sites – Alphabetical listing of articles on porular places for recreational diving
