= Nataliia Zharkova =

Ukrainian freediver (born 1989)

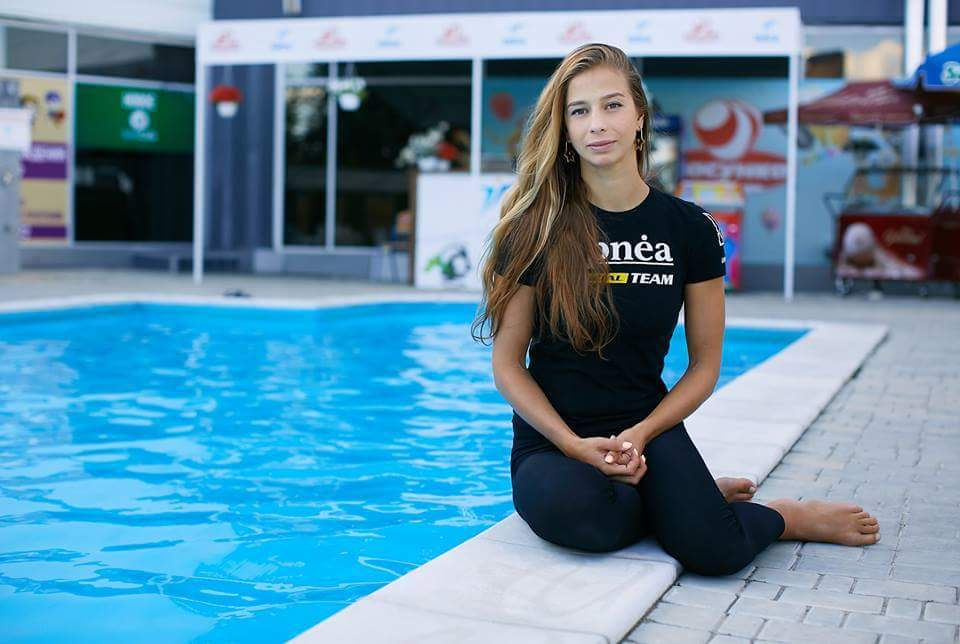
- Zharkova in 2017

Personal information
- Native name: Жаркова Наталія Сергіївна
- Citizenship: Ukraine
- Born: 24 January 1989 (age 37) Kharkiv, USSR
- Website: natfreediver.com

Sport
- Sport: Freediving
Medal record
World Championships
| Silver medal – second place | Kalamata, Greece, 2013 | Constant weight without fins |
| Silver medal – second place | Kalamata, Greece, 2013 | Free immersion apnea |
| Bronze medal – third place | Kalamata, Greece, 2013 | Constant weight bi-fins |
| Bronze medal – third place | Limassol, Cyprus, 2015 | Free immersion apnea |
| Bronze medal – third place | Limassol, Cyprus, 2015 | Constant weight apnea |
| Bronze medal – third place | Kaş, Turkey 2017 | Constant weight apnea |
| Gold medal – first place | Kaş, Turkey, 2017 | Constant weight bi-fins |
| Gold medal – first place | Kaş, Turkey, 2017 | Constant weight without fins |
| Gold medal – first place | Kaş, Turkey, 2018 | Constant weight bi-fins |
| Gold medal – first place | Kaş, Turkey, 2018 | Constant weight without fins |
| Gold medal – first place | Roatan, Honduras, 2019 | Constant weight apnea |
| Silver medal – second place | Roatan, Honduras, 2019 | Constant weight without fins |
| Bronze medal – third place | Roatan, Honduras, 2019 | Constant weight apnea |
| Gold medal – first place | Roatan, Honduras, 2019 | Constant weight bi-fins |
| Silver medal – second place | Roatan, Honduras, 2019 | Free immersion apnea |
| Gold medal – first place | Nice, France, 2019 | Constant weight without fins |
| Gold medal – first place | Kaş, Turkey 2021 | Free immersion apnea |
| Silver medal – second place | Kaş, Turkey, 2021 | Constant weight without fins |
| Bronze medal – third place | Kaş, Turkey, 2021 | Constant weight bi-fins |

Nataliia Zharkova (Ukrainian: Наталія Жаркова; born 24 January 1989) is a Ukrainian freediver. She won five world championships and set five world records in constant weight bi-fins (CWTBF) and constant weight without fins (CNF) disciplines. She is the first Ukrainian and the second woman to ever dive below the arch of the Blue Hole vertical underwater cave in Dahab, Egypt, on a single breath.

== Biography ==
=== Swimming career, 1997–2007 ===
Zharkova started swimming at the age of seven, when her parents introduced her to swimming. Within six months, she was accepted for the school of Olympic Reserve of Ukraine where she spent a total of 10 years.

Zharkova represented Ukraine in various European swimming championships while attending the school of Olympic Reserve of Ukraine.

=== Freediving career 2008–present ===
In 2008, Zharkova was introduced to freediving and began active training.

In 2009, she participated in a world championship held at Aarhus, Denmark. Zharkova set new Ukraine's national records in freediving.

In 2010, Zharkova competed in Ukraine, Russia and Latvia. Each participation brought Zharkova a new Ukraine's national record.

In 2011, the first depth competitions AIDA International World Championship were held at Kalamata, Greece. Zharkova's first participation in the depth competitions put her near the top freedivers in the discipline, taking 6th place in the CNF discipline (constant weight, no fins). She also set new Ukraine national records in the discipline. (AIDA WC-2011 – FIM – Nataliia Zharkova on YouTube)

In 2012, Ukraine first participated in the team world championship event, held in Nice, France. Zharkova represented Ukraine along with Alexander Bubenchikov and Valentin Kuznetsov. Zharkova improved her previous national records and took 5th place in the world rating.

In 2013, the AIDA International World Championships were held in Kalamata, Greece. Zharkova along with Natalia Molchanova won medals in all of the disciplines of the championship.

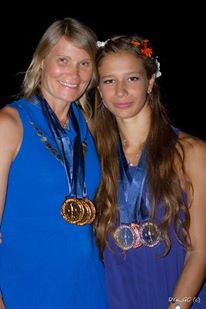
Natalia Molchanova and Zharkova in Kalamata, Greece 2013

- Silver – CNF (Constant weight apnea without fins), 60 m
- Silver – FIM (Free immersion apnea), 78 m
- Bronze – CWT (Constant weight apnea, Bi-fins), 85 m

In 2013–2015, Zharkova was a finalist in the Pool World Championship held in Belgrad, Serbia.

In 2015, the AIDA International Depth World Championship was held in Limassol, Cyprus. Zharkova's results were

- Bronze – FIM (Free immersion apnea)
- Bronze – CWT (Constant weight apnea, with a monofin)

In 2017, Zharkova won two gold and one bronze medal at the Championship of Europe held in Kaş, Turkey. She set two new world records according to CMAS. All dives of that championship were filmed with the Dive Eye underwater drone.

- CWT BF (Constant weight apnea, Bi-fins) – 85 m in 2 min 51 sec – gold, world record
- CNF (Constant weight apnea without fins) – 65 m in 2 min 41 sec – gold, world record
- Constant weight apnea CWT – 85 m in 2 min 36 sec – bronze.

In 2018, Zharkova won two gold medals at the CMAS 3rd Free Diving World Championship held in Kaş, Turkey. She again set two new world records:

- CWT BF – 89 m in 3 min 5 sec – gold, world record;
- CNF – 70 m in 3 min 5 sec – gold, world record.

In 2019, she won gold in CWT, and sat an AIDA national record at the Caribbean Cup 2019 competition in Roatan, Honduras with a 100 m dive.

A few days later, she won gold, two silver, and bronze medals at CMAS 4th Freediving Outdoor World Championship at Roatan, Honduras, and set one world and two national records:

- CNF – 67 m in 3 min – silver;
- CWT – 102 m in 3 min 20 sec – bronze, national record;
- CWTB – 93 m in 3 min 20 sec – gold, world record;
- FIM – 90 m in 3 min 25 sec – silver, national record.

Also in 2019, Zharkova took gold in CNF with 66 m at the AIDA Depth World Freediving Championship in Nice, France.

In 2021, Zharkova won gold, silver, and bronze medals at the 5th CMAS Freediving Outdoor World Championship held in Kaş, Turkey, and set two national records:

- FIM – 91 m – gold, national record;
- CNF – 67 m – silver;
- CWTBF – 97 m – bronze, national record.

At 2021 AIDA Freediving World CUP in Sharm El Sheikh, Egypt, Zharkova took three gold (in CWT, CNF and CWTB) and one silver (FIM) medals.

=== Current activities ===
Currently Zharkova is a master Instructor at AIDA International, instructor (Emergency First Response-EFR). She is a chairman of the Freediving committee at UFUA (Ukrainian Federation of Underwater Activities) and is a member of the CMAS international committee. She is an author of multiple training programs and a coach at the Deep Division freediving school in Kharkiv, Ukraine. Zharkova conducts training in warm climate locations, most notably in Dahab, Egypt and actively prepares for upcoming competitions.

=== Personal records ===
- DYN, Dynamic apnea with fins – 172 meters
- DNF, Dynamic apnea without fins – 132 meters
- FIM, Free immersion apnea – 91 meters
- CWT, Constant weight apnea – 102 meters
- STA, Static Apnea – 6 minutes 02 seconds
- CWTBF, Constant weight apnea, Bi-fins – 97 meters, national record
- CNF, Constant weight apnea without fins – 70 meters.

== Education ==
Zharkova graduated from Kharkiv State Technical University of Construction and Architecture in 2012 with a BSc in architecture.

== Notable achievements ==
=== World records ===
During her career Zharkova set five world records under CMAS:

| Date | Discipline | Record | Competition | Location |
|---|---|---|---|---|
| 5 October 2017 | CNF | 65 m | Apnea European Championship Outdoor | Kaş, Turkey |
| 7 October 2017 | CWTBF | 85 m | Apnea European Championship Outdoor | Kaş, Turkey |
| 4 October 2018 | CNF | 70 m | CMAS 3rd Free Diving World Championship | Kaş, Turkey |
| 5 October 2018 | CWTBF | 89 m | CMAS 3rd Free Diving World Championship | Kaş, Turkey |
| 10 August 2019 | CWTBF | 93 m | CMAS 4th Freediving Outdoor World Championship | Roatan, Honduras |

=== Swimming underneath the arch of Blue Hole ===
On 27 October 2016, Zharkova became the first Ukrainian and the second woman in the world (after Natalia Molchanova) to dive through an underwater vertical cave known as Blue Hole on a single breath. Zharkova immersed to a depth of 56 meters and then swam 30 meters under the arch.
