= Frolla =

Frolla is a surname. Notable people with the surname include:

- Louis Frolla (1904-1978), Monégasque writer
- Pierre Frolla (born 1975), Monégasque freediver
