= Michael Board =

British free diver

Michael Board (born 10 October 1970 in Clapham, South London, United Kingdom) is the current British record holder In the free immersion discipline (FIM) and constant weight with fins (CWF).

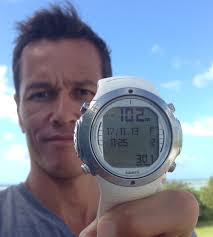
Michael Board British record holder In CWF Freediving At 102 m

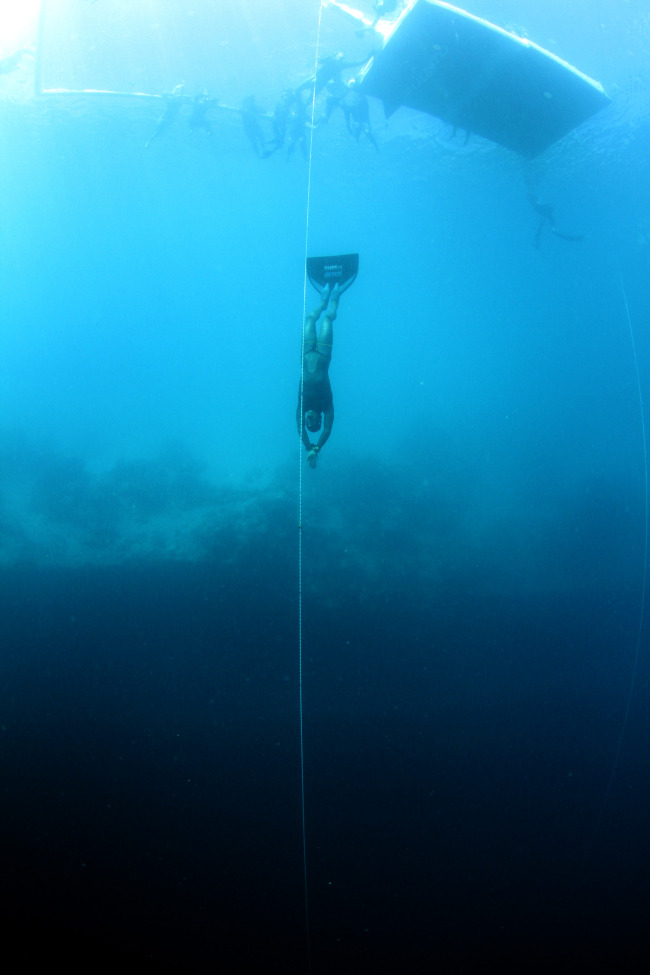
Michael Board British record holder In CWF Freediving

== British Records ==
- 68 M Free Immersion, 8 May 2010, British Blue Hole competition In Dahab, Egypt
- 72 M Free Immersion, 3 May 2011, Freedive International Mini-comp In Dahab, Egypt
- 77 M, Free Immersion, 13 September 2011, Mediterranean Cup In Kalamata, Greece
- 83 M, Free Immersion, 24 September 2011, World Championships In Kalamata, Greece
- 92 M, Constant Weight with Fins, 22 November 2012, Vertical Blue competition, Long Island, Bahamas
- 94 M, Constant Weight with Fins, 26 November 2012, Vertical Blue competition, Long Island, Bahamas
- 96 M, Constant Weight with Fins, 28 November 2012, Vertical Blue competition, Long Island, Bahamas
- 91 M, Free Immersion, 11 November 2013, Vertical Blue competition, Long Island, Bahamas
- 100 M, Constant Weight with Fins, 13 November 2013, Vertical Blue competition, Long Island, Bahamas
- 96 M, Free Immersion, 15 November 2013, Vertical Blue competition, Long Island, Bahamas
- 102 M, Constant Weight with Fins, 17 November 2013, Vertical Blue competition, Long Island, Bahamas
- 103 M, Constant Weight with Fins, December 2014, Vertical Blue competition, Long Island, Bahamas
- 106 M, Constant Weight with Fins, 4 May 2017, Vertical Blue 2017 Freediving competition, Deans Blue Hole, Long Island, Bahamas
- 100 M, Free Immersion, 6 May 2017, Vertical Blue 2017 Freediving Competition, Deans Blue Hole, Long Island, Bahamas
- 108 M, Constant Weight with Fins, 10 May 2017, Vertical Blue 2017 Freediving Competition, Deans Blue Hole, Long Island, Bahamas
- 101 M, Free Immersion, 21 July 2018, Vertical Blue 2018, Deans Blue Hole, Long Island Bahamas
- 111 M, Constant Weight with Fins, 25 July 2018, Vertical Blue 2018, Deans Blue Hole, Long Island, Bahamas
- 102 M, Free Immersion, 26 July 2018, Vertical Blue 2018, Deans Blue Hole, Long Island, Bahamas

== Personal life ==
Board lives in Indonesia, on the island of Gili Trawangan, where he teaches freediving courses and training.
