= Waage Drill II diving accident =

Fatal saturation diving accident in the North Sea in 1975

- Date: 9 September 1975
- Location: Bruce oil field, East Shetland Basin, North Sea, Scotland; 59°46′17.42″N 1°33′6.048″E
- Cause: Rapid pressurization of chamber
- Participants: Peter Henry Michael Holmes, Roger Baldwin
- Outcome: Death due to hyperthermia
- Inquiries: Fatal accident inquiry (Scotland), 30–31 March 1977

The Waage Drill II diving accident occurred in the North Sea off Scotland on 9 September 1975, when two divers died of heatstroke after the chamber they were in was inadvertently pressurised with helium gas.

== Background ==
On 9 September 1975, divers Peter Holmes, 29, and Roger Baldwin, 24, had been hoisted from the North Sea in a bell and connected to the system's entrance lock. The men had just completed a short dive to 390 feet (120 m) to clear a tangle of rope that had wrapped itself around the guideposts of the blowout preventer. The dive had gone well and now the plan was to decompress the men inside the bell to 310 feet (94 m), then transfer them into the chamber complex and hold them in saturation.

As with all deep-dive systems, each chamber on the supervisor's control panel was represented by a series of valves and gauges. Redundancy in plumbing schemes was common and necessary, and with this particular system, by turning several valves on the console, any one depth gauge could be made to monitor the depth of a chamber other than for which it was normally intended. On chamber one's panel, there was a 1,000-foot (300 m) Heise gauge considered to be the most accurate. Because of the cross-referencing capabilities of the system, it became the practice of the shift supervisor to set the valves of this gauge to read the internal depth of the bell prior to the divers leaving bottom, then track their ascent through the lock‑on and transfer procedure. The rationale behind using this particular gauge throughout the operation was to avoid any potential decompression problems that might arise from using two separate gauges with a discrepancy problem. Once the divers had safely passed from the bell to the entrance lock to chamber one, the supervisor was then supposed to turn the valves back to their original positions in order to monitor the depth of the divers.

== Accident ==
Portable saturation system with side lock bell

At 21:50 that day, the crew mated the bell to the entrance lock as planned, but during the lock‑on procedure a gas leak developed between the mating flanges. The bell was removed, the flange surfaces were cleaned, and on the second attempt the bell was successfully sealed to the system. After Holmes and Baldwin equalized the bell with the rest of the complex, they opened the inside door and were in the process of transferring into the entrance lock when the gas leak suddenly returned. With the needle on the Heise gauge dropping, an attempt was made to isolate the divers from the leak by sealing the door of the entrance lock that led to the bell, but according to the dive log this effort was "abandoned".

To protect Holmes and Baldwin from further pressure loss, the supervisor ordered them to climb into chamber one. There, they leaned against the inside hatch while the supervisor injected a small amount of helium inside the chamber to seal the door. At this point, the supervisor forgot to reset the valves to reconnect the Heise gauge with chamber one. Because chamber one was not equipped with a dedicated depth gauge, Holmes and Baldwin were now in a part of the system not being monitored by any gauge. (Note: Testimony at the fatal accident inquiry revealed that the entrance lock depth gauge was turned off to avoid the confusion of getting different gauge readings.) Meanwhile, the Heise gauge was still recording a pressure drop, which the supervisor erroneously believed was reading chamber one. He thought that he had failed to achieve a seal on chamber one's hatch, and so he began to feed large quantities of pure helium into the chamber where the two divers were stationed.

By the time he realized his error, Holmes and Baldwin had been pressurized from 310 feet (94 m) to 650 feet (200 m) over the course of several minutes. The rapid compression, combined with the high thermal transfer property of helium, plus the high humidity factor of the atmosphere, caused the temperature of the atmosphere to rise from an estimated 90 °F (32 °C) to 120 °F (49 °C). The two divers began pulling desperately on the chamber hatch to escape, but were unable to open the door. They took the mattresses off their bunks and lay on the somewhat cooler aluminium surfaces, but forced to breathe an intolerable atmosphere, the men died several hours later of hyperthermia.

== Fatal accident inquiry ==
It was later pointed out by the presiding judge at the fatal accident inquiry that the way in which the diving system was designed and labelled, "especially as operated by Oceaneering, carried a high risk of human error, particularly during the distractions of an emergency". Oceaneering's safety officer testified that the manner in which the control panel was plumbed "was a contributory cause" of the accident, and that it probably would not have happened had the panel for chamber one been equipped with a dedicated depth gauge permanently fixed for the purpose of reading only that chamber. Had there been such a gauge, then the supervisor would not have been misled by the Heise gauge, and therefore would not have had any reason to inject the chamber with massive amounts of helium.

== Sources ==
- Transcript of Evidence in Fatal Accident Inquiry into the deaths of Peter Henry Michael Holmes and Roger Baldwin, March 1977
- Carson, W. G. (1982). The Other Price of Britain's Oil: Safety and Control in the North Sea. Crime, Law, and Deviance. New Brunswick, New Jersey: Rutgers University Press. pp. 63–65. ISBN 0-8135-0957-2.
