= Liv Philip =

British freediver

Olivia K. (Liv) Philip is a record breaking freediver and AIDA International instructor who represents Great Britain. In January 2011 she was awarded AIDA's Absolute Freediver Award 2010 for the highest combined score in six freediving disciplines: static apnea, dynamic apnea with fins, dynamic apnea without fins (pool disciplines), constant weight with fins, constant weight without fins, and free immersion (depth disciplines). In March 2011 she broke the UK women's dynamic, no fins record at the Great Northern Dive Competition, with a 111m swim.

In March 2012 she was chosen to reopen Golden Lane Sport and Fitness centre in the City of London.
