= Paola Tagliabue =

Italian world champion free-diver (born 1976)

Paola Tagliabue (born 7 November 1976, in Como, Lombardy) is an Italian world champion free-diver.

Tagliabue belongs to Tresse Diving Club of Saronno and she is also a member of the Italian national team. In 2005 at "Blue 2005", the most important worldwide free-diving convention, she published a work about lactic acid in free-divers. In 2006, Tagliabue became the world champion in dynamic apnea free-diving with a 152.77 m dive, a CMAS world record. In June 2007, she won the Italian championship, setting a new record with a 156.55 m dive. In March 2008, she won the first Italian spring championship in dynamic apnea without fins with an 87.70 m dive, an Italian record.
