= Ricardo Armbruster =

Spanish ecologist, adventurer and entrepreneur

Ricardo Armbruster Blecher, alias Nano (Madrid, 1944 – Ribadesella, 1976) was a Spanish ecologist, adventurer and entrepreneur.

== Biography ==
He was born in Madrid to the German/Spanish family Armbruster/Blecher. His father Eugen Armbruster was a successful industrialist in Spain (tubes, plastics, metals, energy, banks, forests) and his mother, Trude Armbruster (née Blecher) was a renowned violinist.

At an early age, Ricardo Armbruster and his family discovered that schooling and academic life were not going to be his preferred way of advancing personally. He developed a wide interest in animals and nature in the 1950s, spending long periods at the family farm in Camorritos, Spain, and becoming a respected naturalist at a very early stage. Soon afterwards, at the age of 17, he decided to travel and learn. He spent some time at several academies and jobs in Switzerland, Germany and London, before returning to Madrid and, from there, to the American continent. First, he traveled around the United States and Mexico with his brother and friends, before accepting a job at a bookstore in Bogotá, Colombia. After feeling frustrated by the fact that the store sold books by length for decoration rather than for reading, he felt the call of the wild, embarked on a trip to the south and disappeared in the Amazon rainforest.

Some time later Ricardo Armbruster reappeared in Tenerife, on the Canary Islands. He had made a living by hunting in the forest, making research films, helping national armies explore new territories and, in the end, smuggling coffee to pay for a ship fare back to Europe.

Back in Spain, Ricardo Armbruster settled down, married Erika Born, another German/Spanish national, and had two children: Yaukuma (named after a Mehinaku Indian of the Xingú River Basin) and Thurit Armbruster. The couple moved to Valladolid, in the north of Spain, where Ricardo Armbruster became a successful entrepreneur but was mostly recognized for his activist ecologism and political positioning (against the Spanish State of caudillo Francisco Franco).

Ricardo Armbruster was, together with Erika Born, Carlos Carrasco, José Gimeno and Rafael Álvarez-Taladriz, one of the driving forces behind the creation of the AEORMA ecologist group (Asociación Española para la Ordenación del Medio Ambiente), a strictly forbidden activity under the Francoist State. He was also, with Julio Valdeón Baruque, José Luis Martín Rodríguez, José Luis Barrigón, Carlos Santamaría, Carlos Carrasco, Manuel Conde and others, the driving force behind the creation of the Instituto Regional Castellano-Leonés, an autonomy-enhancing entity that was also subject to severe persecution by Franco's authorities.

Erika and Ricardo Armbruster's home in the Castilian countryside (La Corala) soon became a preferred stop for zoologists and naturalists in the early 1970s, who brought over every kind of fauna to be treated and cured, among them the famous naturalist Félix Rodríguez de la Fuente. This made the premises look more like a zoo than a private home. The property also became a hot spot for debates about democracy and ecology among Spanish intellectuals, artists and oligarchs who appreciated Armbruster's views on these subjects.

A rebel Christian (he married under scrutiny and press coverage following the Catholic and Lutheran rituals at a time of National Catholicism in Spain), Ricardo Armbruster died on Easter Sunday in April 1976, at the age of 32, in Ribadesella, Asturias (Spain), while scuba diving in search of eels and other sea species in the cold waters of the Cantabrian Sea.<El Norte de Castilla>
