= Constant weight bi-fins =

Competitive freediving discipline

Constant weight bi-fins, denoted by the acronym CWTB in competition notation, is a competitive freediving discipline wherein the freediver wears a pair of bi-fins (or stereo, as opposed to a monofin) to descend along the line with or without the use of their arms. Pulling on the rope or changing ballast will result in disqualification; only a single hold of the rope is allowed in order to turn and stop the descent and start the ascent. The diver is prohibited from using a dolphin kick; doing so will result in disqualification of the day's dive.

For AIDA International officiated freediving competitions, bi-fins was previously included under the umbrella term of constant weight (CWT) in competition. Prior to 2019, competitors wanting to use bi-fins in competition would compete under the category of constant weight alongside those using a monofin. In 2019, AIDA formally separated Constant Weight Apnea with Bi-fins (CWTB) into its own category for competition. Following the rule changes, national record and world record titles could now be earned for the category of CWTB.

For CMAS officiated freediving competitions, bi-fins has been recognized as a competitive category separate to constant weight (with a monofin), with officiated records for bi-fins starting as early as 2015.

== Current world record holders in CWTB ==
=== Men ===
- Depth: 129 m
- Person: Alexey Molchanov Russia
- Date: 2026-07-22
- Location: Philippines, AIDA Freediving World Championship, 2026

=== Women ===
- Depth: 109 m
- Person: Alessia Zecchini Italy
- Date: 2023-03-29
- Location: Moalboal, Philippines, 2023
