= Michele Westmorland =

American underwater photographer

Michele Westmorland is an American photographer who specializes in underwater photography. She is a fellow of the International League of Conservation Photographers and The Explorers Club. She runs Westmorland Images in Redmond, Washington, where she resides.

Westmorland's preferred area of travel is Papua New Guinea. Her stock is represented by Getty, Corbis, and Fotostock.

== Life ==
Westmorland was born in Seattle, Washington and attended Barry University in Miami, Florida from 1990 to 1992. She worked in the corporate world for 22 years before taking up photography.

== Publications ==
Westmorland's photographs have been published in publications such as: Smithsonian, National Geographic Traveler & Adventure, Outside, Outdoor Photographer, Sport Diver, Ocean Geographic, Scuba Diving, Elite, Unterwasser, Wyland's Ocean Realm, Asian Geo, Diver Canada, Alert Diver, and Scuba Diver Australasia.

In 2005, Westmorland was inspired to retrace the journey of American portrait artist Caroline Mytinger, who traveled to Melanesia in the 1920s to paint portraits of the indigenous peoples. The Headhunt Revisited project became a documentary film; the documentary, Headhunt Revisited: With Brush, Canvas, and Camera, premiered in 2017, combining historical footage with modern-day documentation of the people and cultures in Melanesia.

== Awards and honors ==
Westmorland was inducted into the Women Divers Hall of Fame in 2011. Awards she has won include the Environmental Photography Invitational, Photo District News, and the PNG Underwater Photo Competition.
