= Leonardo D'Imporzano =

Italian free-diver and AIDA International Judge

Leonardo D'Imporzano (born March 19, 1982, in La Spezia, Italy) is an Italian free-diver, an AIDA International Judge, underwater journalist, researcher conservationist, and TV personality. Pioneer of freediving under ice, he achieves the best performance under ice in Dynamic without fins at Smeraldo Lake in Val di Non (Trento, Italy) 24 February 2008 with 43 metres.

With his team he has carried out in hyperbaric and diving medicine research, with the first-ever electrocardiogram under ice and the deepest electrocardiogram.

== Underwater journalist ==
In the 2013, he was the first journalist "embedded" to follow the "Corso Ordinario Palombari" (the Italian Navy Diver) since its founding 165 years ago. From the first day until the end of 44 weeks. From this experience he wrote the book "PALOMBiRO. Pagine dal fondo". (Magenes 2014).

== Books ==
He wrote: "L’Orecchio del Subacqueo" (IRECO). 2010 ISBN 978-88-86253-36-9 "Le Cinque Terre con le pinne" (Magenes) ISBN 978-88-66490-08-1 "SubPuntoCom" Ebook. "PALOMBiRO. Pagine dal fondo". (Magenes) ISBN 978-8866490784

== Media work ==
D'Imporzano also writes and contributes in more than 600 articles of magazines and he's a speaker in shows and conferences on the topic of freediving and environmental protection.

== Other activities ==
He has flown in zero gravity with ESA (European Space Agency) during the 60th "Zero G", Esa's flight campaign in Bordeaux - Mérignac Airport France by the company Novespace

== Awards ==
He has received awards from Comune di Lerici, La Spezia (Italy) for his sport activity, from the International Festival "ImagOrbetello" – Osservare – Impressionare – Sorprendere", the Special Prize for "Man of Sports and Culture. For his commitment to the Promotion and Protection of the Territory Coastal. From [ Uisp - attività subacquee] the Diploma in "Duilio Marcante Prize", "For significant contributions to the preservation of human life in the water". The "Tridente d'oro" or the year 2018, becoming member of the International Academy of Underwater Sciences and Techniques.
