= Karol Meyer =

Brazilian free-diver and world record holder, born 1968

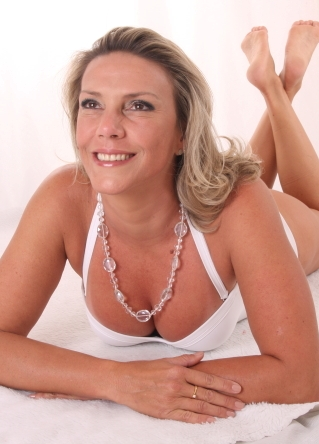
- Born: 19 October 1968 (age 57); Recife, Brazil
- Citizenship: Brazil
- Occupation: Free-diver
- Website: karolmeyer.com.br

Karoline Mariechen "Karol" Meyer (born October 19, 1968 in Recife, Pernambuco, Brazil) is a Brazilian free diver. She holds a Guinness World Record in apnea free diving for a dive of 100 m (330 ft) with a time of 18 minutes and 32 seconds, and has achieved third place in the world in variable weight discipline, diving 93 m (305 ft).

== Career ==
According to Rank Brazil, Meyer became the first Brazilian woman athlete to achieve world records, and won the highest number of titles in the country's sporting history. She was the first athlete in the freediving community to break a world record during an official free diving competition.

During her career, Meyer achieved 13 victories in international events and 7 victories in national events. In 2003, she became the first apnea diver to reach one of the deepest shipwrecks in the world, diving 63 meters to the Corvette Ipiranga.
