= Walter Steyn =

Australian competitive freediver, freediving judge and freediving instructor

Walter Steyn is an Australian competitive freediver, freediving judge and freediving instructor. He has set 33 Australian national freediving records and currently holds six.

== Records ==
Steyn's current national records (world ranking bracketed) are:

- 106 m (Constant Weight), 16 April 2011 at the Vertical Blue 2011 Competition at Dean's Blue Hole, Bahamas;
- 215 m (Dynamic With Fins), 15 August 2009 at the Ian Thorpe Aquatic centre, Sydney;
- 175 m (Dynamic No Fins), 14 August 2008 at the Wellington Winter Championships;
- 74 m (Constant weight no fins), 14 April 2011 at the Vertical Blue 2011 Competition at Dean's Blue Hole, Bahamas;
- 8:01 (Static), 6 May 2011 at Kona, Hawaii USA.

== Activities ==
Steyn is an AIDA accredited freediving judge and has judged several international competitions and world record attempts.
