= Bernard Delemotte =

French underwater diver and photographer (1939–2023)

- Born: 1939
- Died: 2023 (aged 83–84)
- Occupation: Photographer

Bernard Delemotte (1939 – 14 January 2023) was a French underwater diver and photographer who was a member of the oceanographic research team of the Cousteau Society, founded by Jacques-Yves Cousteau. He participated as a chief diver, underwater cameraman and expedition team leader in various Cousteau Society's projects such as the ones featured in the television series The Cousteau Odyssey filmed between 1977 and 1982.

Delemotte died on 14 January 2023, at the age of 83 as a result of a diving accident in Friuli.
