= Natalia Molchanova =

Russian multiple world record holding freediver (1962–2015)

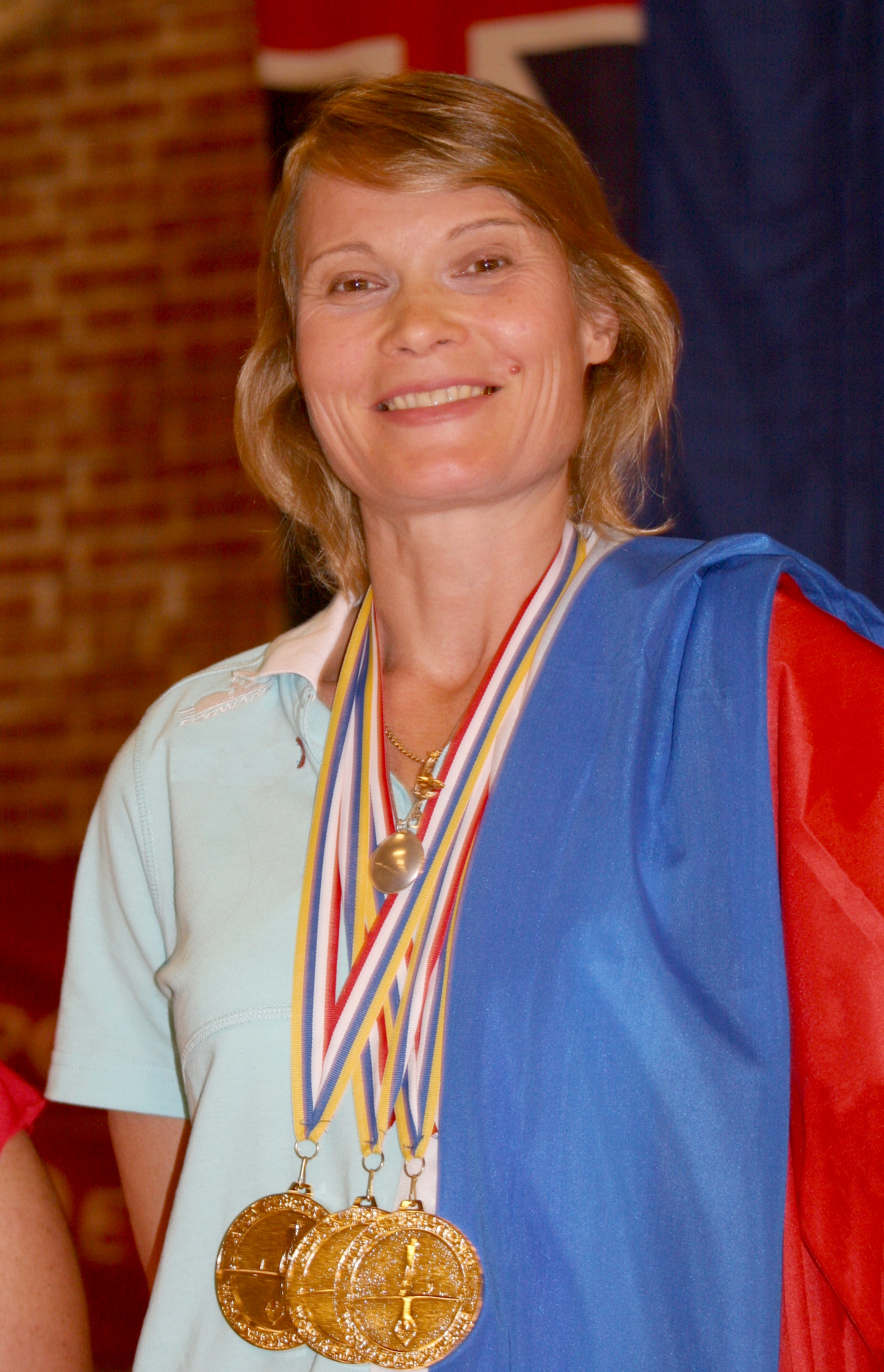
- Molchanova at the 2009 Freediving World Championships

Personal information
- Native name: Наталья Молчанова
- Born: 8 May 1962 Ufa, Bashkortostan, Soviet Union
- Children: 2 (including Alexey Molchanov)
- Disappeared: 2 August 2015 (aged 53); Formentera, Spain

Sport
- Sport: Freediving
- Club: Krokodil, Moscow

Natalia Vadimovna Molchanova (Russian: Наталья Вадимовна Молчанова; 8 May 1962 – 2 August 2015) was a Russian champion freediver, multiple world record holder, and the former president of the Russian Free Dive Federation. Described as "possibly the world’s greatest freediver," Molchanova set an unparalleled standard in the sport. She believed, “Freediving is not only a sport, it is a way to understand who you are,” reflecting her deep connection to the sport. Throughout her career, she achieved 42 world records and earned 22 world championship medals, 19 of which were gold.

== Personal life ==
Molchanova was born in 1962 in Ufa, Bashkortostan, then part of the Soviet Union. Molchanova had a son Alexey and daughter Oksana.

Molchanova's son is Russian freediving champion Alexey Molchanov.

On 2 August 2015, Molchanova vanished in Formentera while giving a private lesson. Search efforts were abandoned on 5 August and she was presumed dead.

== Career ==
Before becoming known as "possibly the world's greatest freediver", Natalia Molchanova trained as a swimmer in her youth. After the birth of her two children she semi-retired for approximately 20 years. At the age of 40, she resumed training, transitioning from swimming to freediving. Her first freediving competition was the 2003 Russian championships in Moscow, where she set a national record.

Even after her disappearance in 2015, Molchanova remains one of the world's most decorated freedivers, having set 42 world records—21 pool records and 21 open water—during her career. She also earned 22 world championship medals, including 19 golds. Her final STA world record of 9 minutes and 2 seconds is still not broken after 11 years (standpoint: 2024). At the 2007 Freediving World Championships in Maribor, Slovenia, her winning time in the static discipline was better than the winning male gold medal. In September 2009, she became the first woman to pass 100 meters (328 ft.) diving with constant weight, in a dive to 101 meters (331 ft.) in Sharm el Sheikh, Egypt. Molchanova was also the first woman to dive on one breath through the Blue Hole arch in Dahab, Egypt. Her record was a dive of 127 metres (417 ft.).

Molchanova later also worked as a freediving instructor at the Russian State University of Physical Education, Sport, Youth and Tourism.

== Disappearance ==
On 2 August 2015, Molchanova was reported missing after giving a private lesson dive near Formentera, Spain. She went down to a depth of 40 metres (131 ft.), not as deep as normal; but, caught by a current, without weights, she is thought to have been taken down deeper. She never came up for air. Initial rescue and recovery efforts were unsuccessful. Search and rescue efforts continued for a few days, but she was eventually presumed dead by the search party, including her son, Alexey Molchanov.

The Spanish Civil Code provides that a missing person by shipwreck or amid a dangerous activity shall be declared deceased in absentia three months after a missing report.

== See also ==
- List of people who disappeared mysteriously at sea

== World records ==
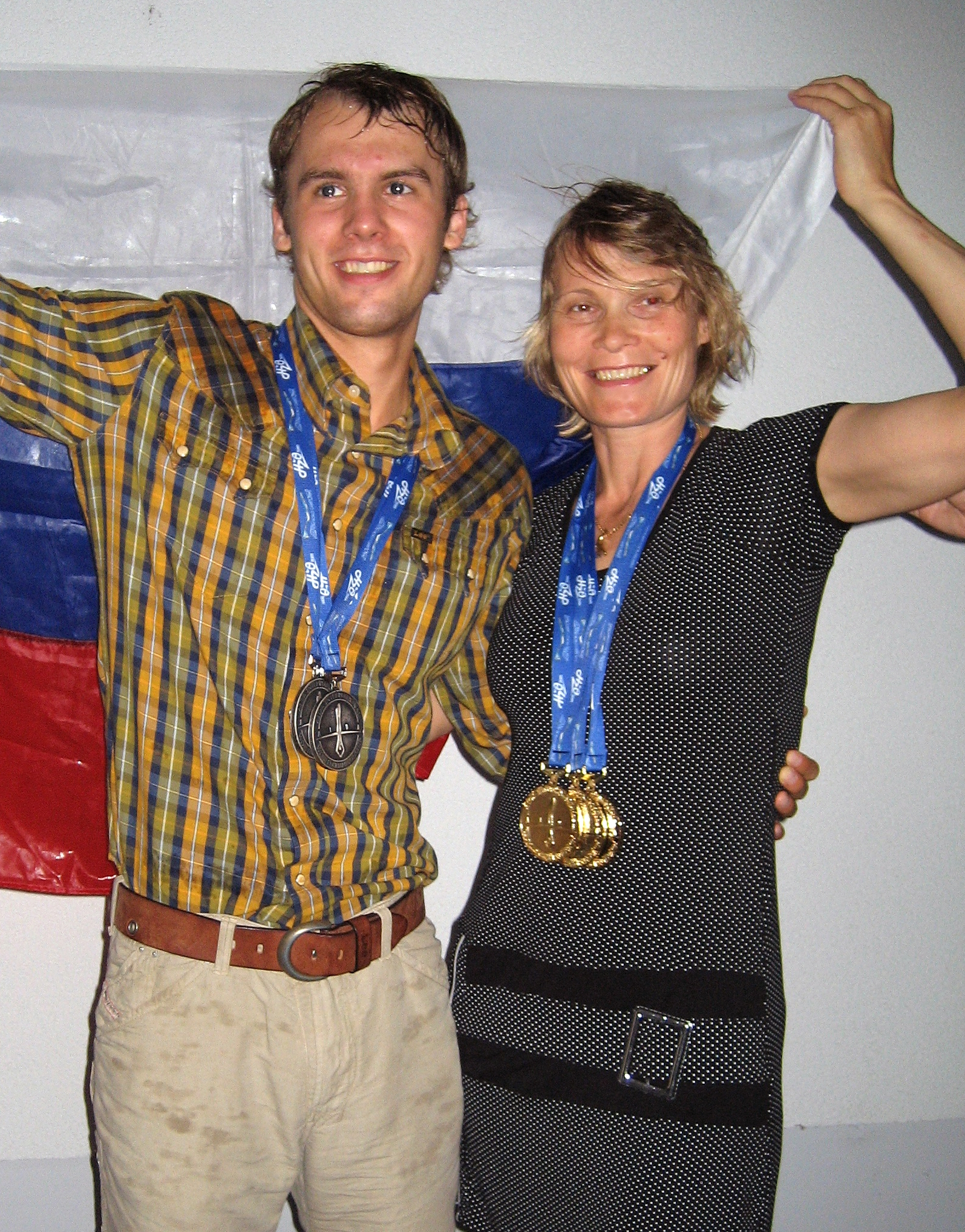
Alexey and Natalia Molchanova at the 2007 Freediving World Championships

Apnea	Association	Record	Date	Location
CNF	AIDA	70 m	15 May 2014	Dahab (Egypt)
FIM		91 m	21 Sep 2013	Kalamata (Greece)
CNF		69 m	16 Sep 2013	Kalamata (Greece)
STA	AIDA	9:02"	28 Jun 2013	Belgrade (Serbia)
DYN		234 m	28 Jun 2013	Belgrade (Serbia)
DNF		182 m	27 Jun 2013	Belgrade (Serbia)
CNF		68 m	25 April 2013	Dahab (Egypt)
VWT		127 m	6 Jun 2012	Sharm (Egypt)
CNF		66 m	8 May 2012	Dahab (Egypt)
FIM		88 m	24 Sep 2011	Kalamata (Greece)
CWT		101 m	22 Sep 2011	Kalamata (Greece)
CWT		100 m	16 April 2011	Blue Hole (Bahamas)
VWT		125 m	16 June 2010	Kalamata (Greece)
DYN		225 m	25 April 2010	Moscow (Russia)
CNF		62 m	3 Dec 2009	Blue Hole (Bahamas)
FIM		90 m*	27 Sep 2009	Sharm (Egypt)
CWT		101 m*	25 Sep 2009	Sharm (Egypt)
STA		8:23"	21 August 2009	Aarhus (Denmark)
DNF		160 m	20 August 2009	Aarhus (Denmark)
DYN		214 m	5 October 2008	Lignano (Italy)
FIM		85 m	27 July 2008	Crete (Greece)
CWT		95 m	25 July 2008	Crete (Greece)
CNF		60 m	12 June 2008	Dahab (Egypt)
FIM		82 m	10 June 2008	Dahab (Egypt)
DNF		149 m	7 July 2007	Maribor (Slovenia)
STA		8:00"	6 July 2007	Maribor (Slovenia)
DYN		205 m	5 July 2007	Maribor (Slovenia)
FIM		80 m	3 June 2006	Dahab (Egypt)
DYN		200 m	23 April 2006	Moscow (Russia)
STA		7:30"	22 April 2006	Moscow (Russia)
DNF		131 m	20 December 2005	Tokyo (Japan)
CNF		55 m	7 November 2005	Dahab (Egypt)
FIM		78 m	5 November 2005	Dahab (Egypt)
CWT		86 m	3 September 2005	Villefranche (France)
DNF		124 m	25 August 2005	Renens (Switzerland)
STA		7:16"	25 August 2005	Renens (Switzerland)
DYN		178 m	25 August 2005	Renens (Switzerland)
DYN		172 m	24 April 2005	Moscow (Russia)
DNF		108 m	23 April 2005	Moscow (Russia)
DYN		155 m	25 April 2004	Moscow (Russia)
DYN		150 m	26 May 2003	Limassol (Cyprus)

- Note 1: The two records from 2009, 101 m and 90 m, were repealed by the federation eight months after they had been set, due to the introduction of a new rule, which was then applied retroactively.
- Note 2: Freediving#Competitive apnea defines the various Apnea codes. Record distances are in metres; duration times in minutes and seconds.

Summary:

- STA - 9 min. 02 sec.
- DYN - 234 m
- DNF - 182 m
- CWT - 101 m
- CNF - 69 m
- FIM - 91 m
- VWT - 127 m

Clarification:

- STA = Static apnea. Holding the breath as long as possible.
- DYN = Dynamic apnea with fins. Diving as far as possible (horizontally) with the use of fins or a monofin.
- DNF = Dynamic apnea without fins. Diving as far as possible (horizontally) without fins.
- CWT = Constant weight with fins. Diving as deep as possible with the use of fins or a monofin.
- CNF = Constant weight without fins. Diving as deep as possible without fins.
- FIM = Free immersion. Diving as deep as possible by pulling down and up the rope.
- VWT = Variable weight apnea. Using a sled for descent, pulling back up along a line or swimming up with or without fins.
- NLT = No-limits apnea. Using a sled for descent, and an inflatable bag for ascent, or any other method or technique.

== Personal bests ==
Discipline		Result	Accreditation
Time	STA	9:02 min	AIDA
Distance	DNF	182 m	AIDA
Distance	DYN	234 m	AIDA
Depth	CNF	70 m	AIDA
Depth	CWT	101 m	AIDA
Depth	FIM	91 m	AIDA
Depth	VWT	127 m	AIDA
Depth	NLT		
