= Patrick Musimu =

Belgian freediver

Patrick Musimu (12 October 1970 – 21 July 2011) was a Belgian freediver, sport business manager, marketing and event manager, and physiotherapist. He was born in Kinshasa, Zaire. On 30 June 2005, he beat the previous "No Limits" world record in freediving by almost 40 meters by diving to 209 meters. Following his request, this dive was done without the supervision of the International Association for Freediving agency, from which Musimu dissociated since 2002. According to him, extreme deep freediving should not be considered as a sport but as an adventure.

Musimu began diving in 1999 at the age of 28, intrigued by what he called "dolphin-men". His secret lay in years and years of training and preparation, but special attention should be given to his ear clearing technique: instead of equalizing his ears by the regular maneuvers, he flooded his air spaces (sinus and middle ears) with seawater before reaching the depth where ordinary equalization would become hard. He had a lung capacity of 9 litres and could hold his breath for more than 8 min 33 sec. In Stan Lee's Superhumans, a show on the History Channel, Musimu claimed meditation and yoga to be the reason behind his apparent powers of holding breath.

On 21 July 2011, Musimu died while pool training alone in Brussels, Belgium, and was found by his wife and daughter.
