= Elisabeth Kristoffersen =

Norwegian freediver and president of AIDA Norway

Elisabeth Kristoffersen (born 23 May 1988) is a Norwegian freediver and the current president of AIDA Norway (the freediving federation of Norway). She won the silver medal in the AIDA World Championships 2007 in Maribor, with a dynamic dive to 174 meters.

== Current national records ==
- Dynamic Apnea with fins: 183 meters
- Dynamic Apnea without fins: 125 meters
- Static Apnea: 6 min 15 sec
- Constant Weight Apnea: 65 meters
- Constant Weight Apnea without fins: 40 meters
- Free Immersion Apnea: 55 meters
