= Peter Scoones =

Underwater cameraman

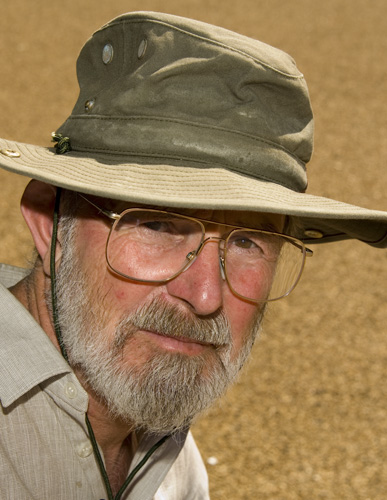
Peter Scoones

Peter Scoones (27 October 1937 – 20 April 2014) was an underwater cameraman known for his oceanic photography. He took underwater photographs with lighting handled by his wife Georgette Douwma from 1959 until his death on 20 April 2014.

== Filmography ==
- Earth - (Cinematographer/2009/Lensing/Awaiting Release)
- Deep Blue - (Cinematographer/2005)

== Awards ==
- Brighton International Film Festival Gold Medal for the Best Amateur Film
- Brighton International Film Festival Underwater Photographer of the Year (twice)
- Birmingham Film Festival Best British Underwater Photographer (twice)
