= Samir Alhafith =

Australian technical diver, cave explorer and adult underwater filmmaker

Samir Alhafith is an Australian technical diver, cave explorer and underwater filmmaker. He is the founder and team leader of the Sydney Project – an association of technical divers involved in researching and discovering important historical wrecks in depths between 75 and 135 metres (246 and 443 ft) on the south coast New South Wales.

Alhafith was born in Baghdad, Iraq, and moved to Australia as a teenager. He began diving in 1995, and has gone on to become one of the countries leading exponents of rebreather technology, helping to discover and identify several World War II wrecks between Sydney and the Victorian border. He has also been involved in deep diving explorations and searches for two Australian submarines, HMAS AE2 in Turkey and HMAS AE1 in Papua New Guinea.

Alhafith won the 2007 Oztek Diver of the Year Award in recognition of his wreck exploration efforts both at home and abroad. He is also an active writer on the subject of deep technical diving in diving related publications, and a regular columnist in "Dive Log Australasia" Magazine.
