= Pierre Frolla =

Monegasque free-diver and world record holder

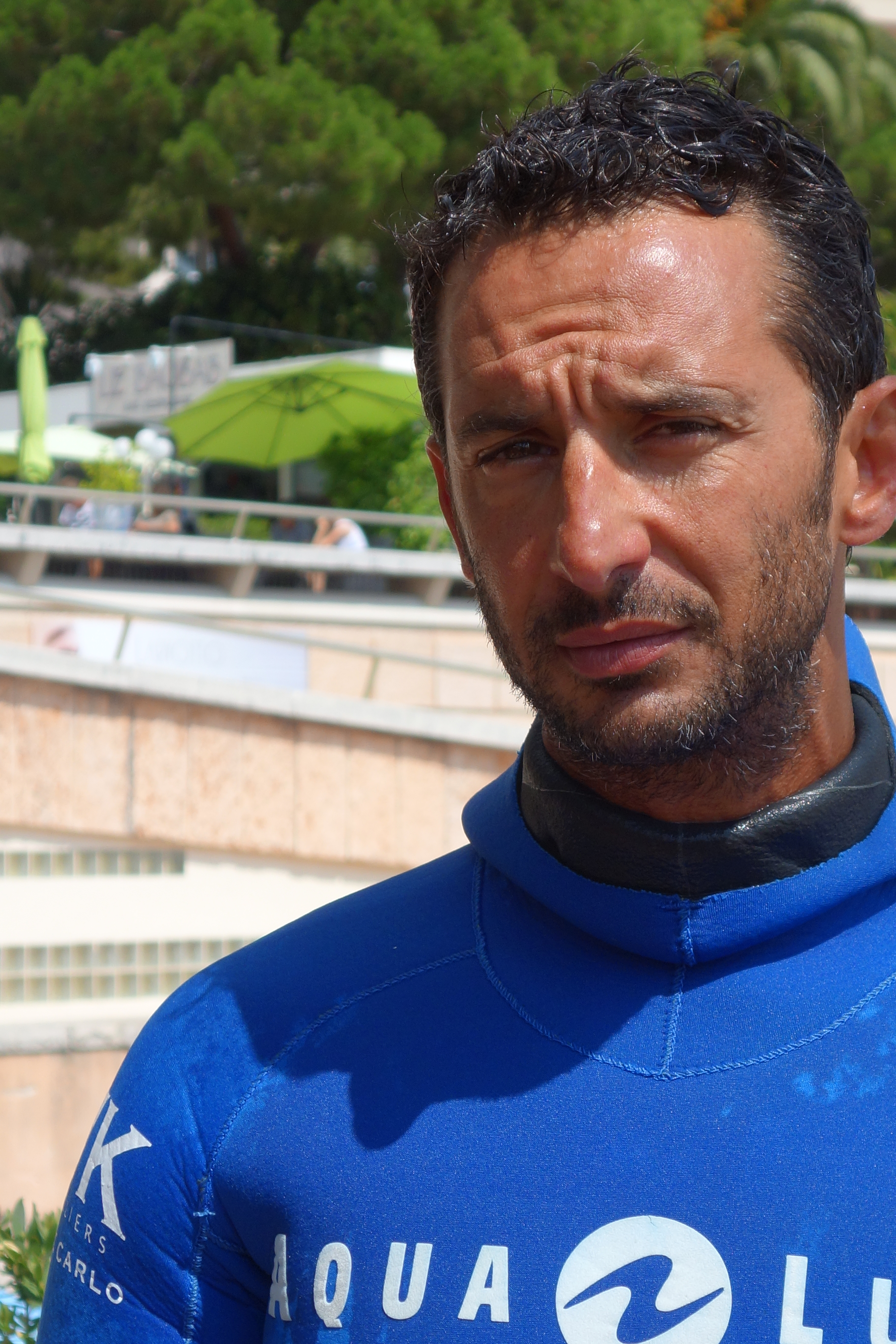
Pierre Frolla

Pierre Frolla (born 14 February 1975) is a Monegasque freediver. He is a triple world record holder in Free Immersion (including -80 meters on 17 August 2001 in Monaco).

In 1998, Pierre took his first French record in variable weight, improving the time of Loic Leferme by 2 meters (-82m).

In 2000, he took his second World record, -73m in Free Immersion. Following this competition, Leferme and Frolla travelled around the world with VM Production to produce a movie called The Fish-Men, a 52-minute production by France Television. The movie took one year and included Frolla's third world record of -80 meters, set in 2001.

Frolla is today a member of the Champions for Peace, a group of 54 elite athletes who promote peace in the world through sport, created by Peace and Sport, a Monaco-based international organization.
