= Constant weight apnea =

Freediving discipline

Constant weight (CWT) is a freediving discipline recognised by AIDA, the International Association for the Development of Apnea, in which the freediver descends and ascends using their monofin and/or with the use of their arms without pulling on the rope or changing their ballast; only a single hold of the rope to stop the descent and start the ascent is allowed. Constant weight is one of the eight disciplines considered for international competition, the others being constant weight bi-fins (CWTB), constant weight without fins (CNF), static apnea (STA), dynamic apnea without fins (DNF), dynamic with fins (DYN), free immersion (FIM), and dynamic apnea bi-fins (DYNB).

== Current World Record Holders ==
- men: Alexey Molchanov (Russia), 136 metres in 4 minutes 37 seconds. (2023-08-21)
- women: Alessia Zecchini (Italia), 123 metres (2023-07-18)
