= Guillaume Néry =

French freediver

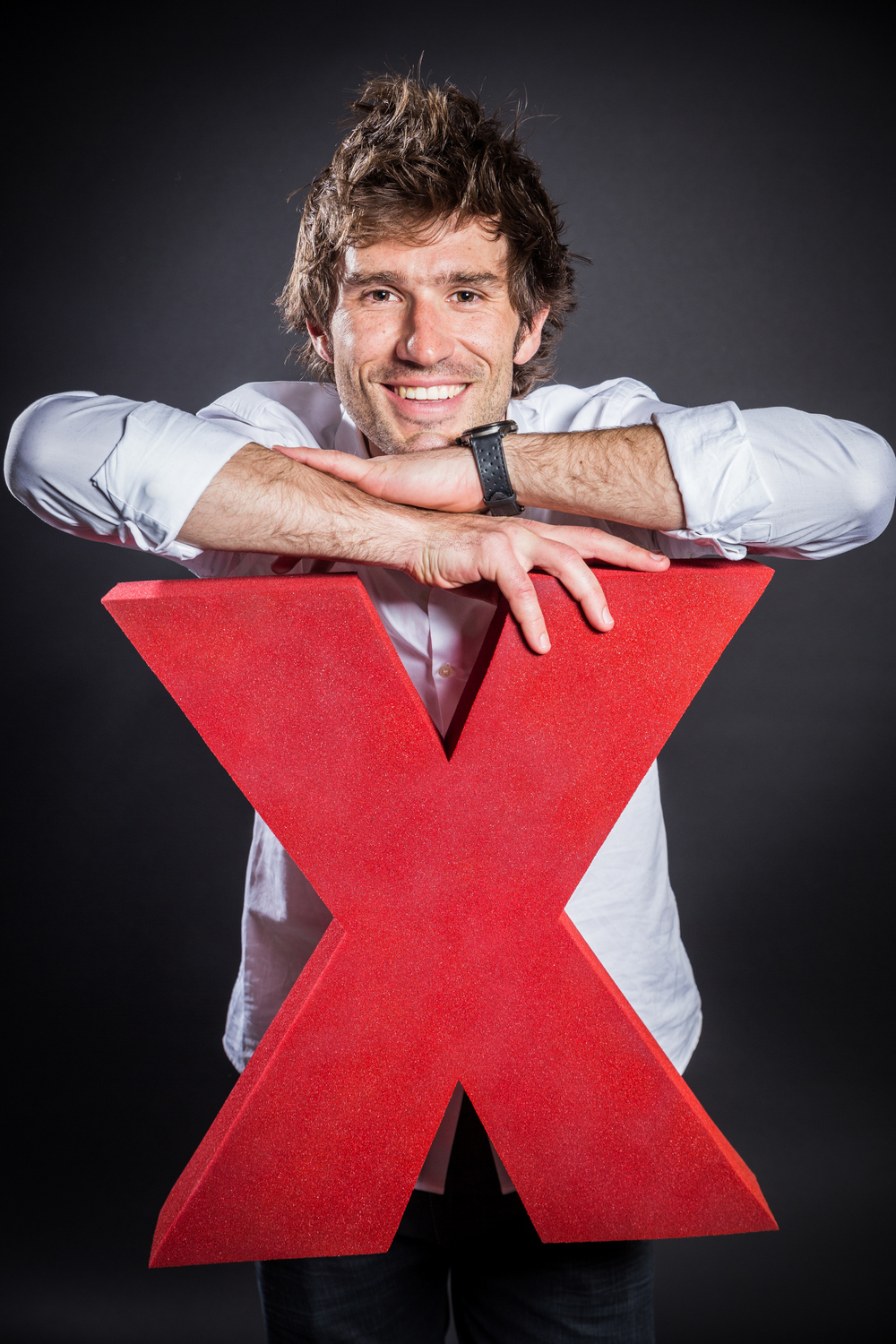
- Born: July 11, 1982 (age 44)
- Occupation: Free diver
- Notable work: Free Fall, Narcosis, Ocean Gravity
- Website: https://guillaumenery.com/

Guillaume Néry (born 11 July 1982) is a French free diver, who holds multiple world records in freediving.

== Sports career ==
Néry grew up in Nice, by the Mediterranean sea, and discovered freediving by accident when he was 14 years old. He then decided to join a freediving club, where he began to specialise in the constant weight discipline, using fins and without the use of a sled. At 19 years old, he joined the France national team and set a French constant weight national record of -82 meters (which also matched the world record at the time). The following year, he reached -87 meters in constant weight, becoming the youngest world record holder in the history of freediving.

In 2004, Néry travelled to Reunion Island, where he set another world record of -96m. In 2005, while training for the first freediving world championships organized in Nice, Néry reached -100m during a training session. The same year, he reached -105m, which was Jacques Mayol's last world record, set in 1983 in the No Limits discipline (going down with a sled, and coming up with a balloon filled with air). In 2006, Néry reached -109m.

In 2007, his friend Loïc Leferme died during a training dive.

In July 2008, he broke the constant weight world record for the fourth time with -113 meters. Two months later, with the French freediving team (with Morgan Bourc'his and Christian Maldamé) he became Team World Champion in Egypt. It was the first gold medal for the French Team in a freediving world championship. In 2011, Néry won the constant weight AIDA freediving World Champion title, in Kalamata, Greece, the last title that was still missing in his career, with a dive to -117 meters.

On 8 September 2015, during a pre-competition leading up to the individual world championships in Cyprus, Néry broke his own personal best and set the second deepest dive in history to -126m, two meters away from the world record, held by his friend Alexey Molchanov. He then decided to tackle the world record two days later, on the last day of this pre-competition, 5 days before the start of the World Championships.

On 10 September 2015, Néry made an attempt to dive to -129m, but the judges and organizers made a mistake when setting the dive line, meaning that he actually dived down to -139m. He had a black-out a few meters from the surface and suffered a lung barotrauma. The accident forced him to pull out of the world championships, and he subsequently retired from competition.

== Records ==
AIDA records of Guillaume Nery:

- 2001: French record: -82 m / constant weight / Nice (France) - team vice world champion - Ibiza/ Spain
- 2002: World record: -87 m / constant weight / Nice (France)
- 2004: World record: -96 m / constant weight / Reunion Island (France)
- 2006: World record: -109 m / constant weight / Nice (France) - 3rd at the team world championships - Hurghada (Egypt)
- 2008: World record: -113 m / constant weight / Nice (France) - Team world champion - Sharm El Sheikh (Egypt)
- 2009: 3rd at the individual world championships / constant weight without fins (-78m) - Bahamas 2010: French record: -115 m / constant weight / Bahamas
- 2011: Individual world champion in constant weight and French record with a dive to -117m in Kalamata (Greece)
- 2012: French record: -123 m / constant weight / Bahamas - team vice world champion - Nice (France)
- 2013: French record: -125 m / constant weight / Kalamata (Greece)
- 2015: French record: -126 m / constant weight / Cyprus

== Filmmaking ==
In 2010 Néry and his ex- partner Julie Gautier directed a short film called Free Fall, which was watched more than 30 million times. It showed him swimming into Dean's Blue Hole in The Bahamas. Between 2011 and 2012, Néry and Gautier made another short film, Narcosis, directed by Julie Gautier and released in 2014.

In 2014, during a trip to Polynesia, the couple started their third short film, Ocean Gravity, at Rangiroa atoll. In 2016, Néry released another movie, Haven, shot on The Haven, one of the biggest shipwrecks in the Mediterranean, off the coast of Genoa. The same year he appeared in Attention - A Life in Extremes, a documentary about extreme sports.

Néry appeared (alongside Alice Modolo) in Naughty Boy and Beyoncé's music video of the song "Runnin' (Lose It All)", released on 18 September 2015.

In 2019, Néry and Gautier released the short film One Breath Around the World. Filming took place in multiple countries, including Mexico, Japan, Finland, the Philippines, and Mauritius.

== See also ==
- Francisco Ferreras
- Audrey Mestre
- Scuba diving
