= Abdelatif Alouach =

Algerian freediver (born 1976)

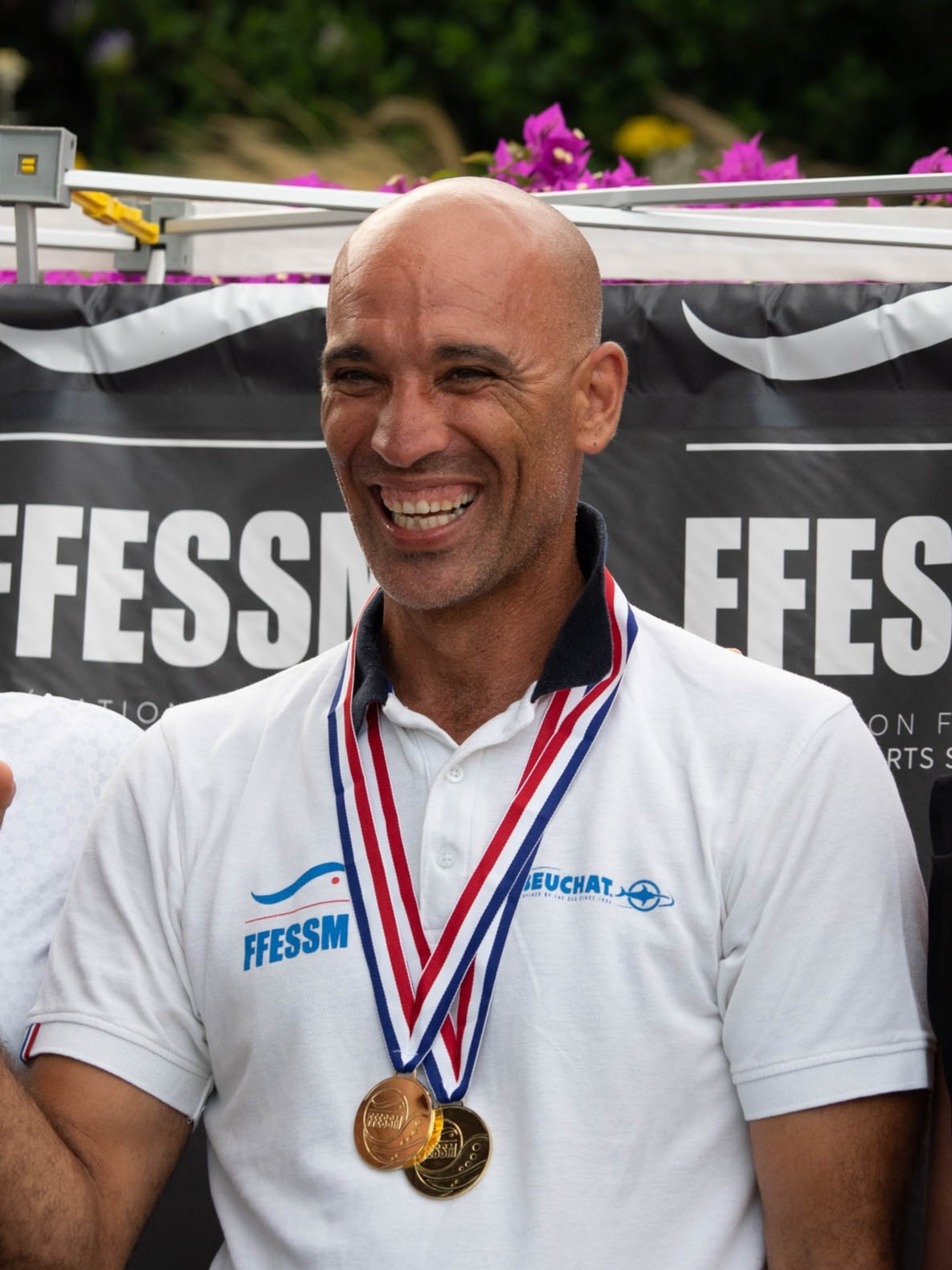

Personal information
- Nationality: Algeria
- Born: 9 August 1976 (age 49) Algiers, Algeria
- Website: alouach-abdelatif.com

Sport
- Sport: Freediving

Abdelatif Alouach, born August 9, 1976, in Algiers (Algeria) is an Algerian freediving champion and records holder, who has won several world championships in different freediving specialties. He grew up in Martigues, near Marseille, France. After having been a spearfisherman for many years, today he leads a dual career as a high-level sportsman and freediving instructor. He has been a member of the FFESSM's Freediving French team since 2018.

== Palmares ==
=== 2022 ===
Results	Discipline	Performance	Federation
1st – France Championship	CNF		
1st – France Championship	CWT		
France Record	CWT	112 m	
1st – Word Championship	CWT.B		AIDA
1st – Word Championship	CNF		AIDA
1st – Word Championship	CWT		AIDA
2nd – World Championship	FIM		AIDA

=== 2021 ===
Results	Discipline	Performance	Federation
1st – France Championship	CNF		
1st – France Championship	CWT.B		
World Record	CWT.B	115 m	
France Record	CNF	85 m	
France Record	CWT.B	111 m	
1st – Word Championship	CWT.B		CMAS
2nd – World Championship	CNF		CMAS
3rd – World Championship	FIM		AIDA
2nd – World Championship	CWT.B		AIDA
2nd – World Championship	FIM		AIDA
2nd – World Championship	CWT		AIDA

=== 2019 ===
Results	Discipline	Performance	Federation
2nd – France Championship	CNF		
2nd – France Championship	FIM		
France Record	CWT.B	103 m	
France Record	FIM	102 m	
France Record	FIM	100 m	
France Record	CNF	82 m	
2nd – World Championship	CNF		CMAS
2nd – World Championship	CWT.B		CMAS
2nd – World Championship	FIM		AIDA
2nd – World Championship	CNF		AIDA

=== 2018 ===
First membership of the FFESSM National French team

Results	Discipline	Performance	Federation
2nd – France Championship	CNF	66 m	
