= Skandalopetra diving =

Freediving using a stone weight at the end of a rope to the surface

Skandalopetra diving (Greek: σκανταλόπετρα) dates from ancient Greece, when it was used by sponge fishermen, and has been re-discovered in recent years as a freediving discipline. It was in this discipline that the first world record in freediving was registered, when the Greek sponge fisherman Stathis Chantzis dived to a depth of 83 m (272 ft) in July 1913. It consists of a variable ballast dive using a skandalopetra tied to a rope. A companion on a boat recovers the diver by pulling the rope up after the descent, and keeps a watch on the diver from the surface.

== Origins ==
A skandalopetra dive known to contemporary divers is that of Stathis Chantzis, a Greek sponge fisherman. On 14 July 1913, in the Karpathos port, Chantzis recovered the lost anchor of the Regina Margherita, a ship of the Italian Navy, at the depth of 83 metres (272 ft). His feat is considered the first depth record in apnea diving.

The skandalopetra, or simply petra (πέτρα), is a stone, usually of marble or granite, weighing between 8 and 14 kilograms (18 and 31 lb), with rounded corners and hydrodynamic shape. It was the only tool used by divers, since the time of Alexander the Great. The fishermen, naked, were secured to the stone with a thin cord. The skandalopetra itself was secured to the boat with the same rope. This link allowed fishermen to dive safely for centuries.

== Competitive ==
In recent times skandalopetra diving has become a discipline of competitive apnea. It is a team sport — the only true team event in freediving. Teams are formed by two athletes: one is the diver (βουτηχτής, voutichtis) and the other is the rope tender (κολαουζέρης, kolaouzeris). In modern skandalopetra competition, divers are allowed the use of a noseclip, but other equipment such as a wetsuit, mask or fins is not allowed.

In this discipline, there is no waste of energy, and activity is comparable to the descent in variable weight apnea diving. The athlete prepares for the dive while on the boat, holding the stone, then dives, remaining motionless and as vertical as possible. After reaching the maximum depth of the dive, the diver moves their feet onto the stone and is pulled to the surface by their companion. It is essential that the diver and assistant are co-ordinated; the latter should at all times know the depth of the diver, feel when they slow down to equalize, leaving the stone when it arrives at the bottom, and finally when it is the right time to pull the diver back up. During the descent the diver can handle the stone in different ways, serving as a drag brake, to steer, and as a ballast.

AIDA's no limits discipline is in a sense a contemporary version of skandalopetra diving; instead of a rock the diver uses a weighted sled running down a shotline, and the line attendant is replaced by inflated lifting bags.

== See also ==
- Ama – Japanese pearl divers
- Haenyeo – Female divers of Jeju, South Korea
- Sponge diving – Diving to gather natural sponges
