= AIDA Hellas =

National representative of AIDA International in Greece

- Formation: January 1, 2002; 24 years ago
- Type: Sports Organization (Non-Profit)
- Location: Greece
- Main organ: National Board of Directors
- Parent organization: AIDA International
- Website: www.aidahellas.gr

AIDA Hellas (AIDA, from French: Association Internationale pour le Développement de l'Apnée) is a Greek non-profit organization dedicated to the sport of freediving, officially established in 2002. It is the official national representative of AIDA International in Greece, responsible for the representation of Greek freediving community internationally. It aims to the development of freediving in Greece, organizing events like educational seminars and international level sport competitions, every year. Also, it sets standards for the national record attempts and the selection of the members of the national team for AIDA World Championships.

AIDA Hellas is currently supported by more than 100 members in Greece.

== Main Organs ==
National Board of Directors (5 members)
Responsible for planning and conduct educational seminars, international level sports competitions, national freediving championship and contact press and media.

National Technical Committee (3 members)
Responsible for setting standards for the selection of the members of the National Team for AIDA World Championships.

Both annually elected by the National Assembly.
