= Attention – A Life in Extremes =

- Directed by: Sascha Koellnreitner
- Written by: Sascha Koellnreitner
- Produced by: Carl Hollmann
- Cinematography: Viktor Schaider
- Edited by: Jörg Achatz
- Music by: Anna Müller
- Release date: September 26, 2014
- Running time: 90 minutes
- Country: Austria
- Language: German English French

Attention – A Life in Extremes is a 90-minute documentary film, which explores the phenomenon of extreme sports from a personal and critical perspective. The documentary shows the lives of three athletes: French freediver and world champion Guillaume Néry, Austrian extreme cyclist Gerhard Gulewicz and Norwegian wingsuit flyer Halvor Angvik.

The film was directed by Austrian filmmaker Sascha Koellnreitner. Theatrical release in Austria, Germany and Switzerland will be in September 2014.

Attention - A life in Extremes is the first European documentary and the first Austrian film supporting Dolby Atmos.

== Synopsis ==
Three exceptional athletes in the demanding field of extreme sport are followed. They fly along cliffs, dive without oxygen into the depths of the sea, and prove the capabilities of the human body during the longest endurance bike race.

The movie follows these people in the attempt to find the limits of performance. We get to know their environment, their companions, but also listen to critical voices. We hear the desires and fears of the families and venture, through the inner circle of friends, into the psyche of the athletes.

== Background ==
With the help of the three protagonists "Attention - a Life in Extremes", tells the story of human achievement. The movie highlights the world of high performance sport, as well as other facets of those people who use their body and even risk it in order to draw something special from their existence.

The risks of the represented sports will be shown, and with the help of philosophers such as Paul Konrad Liessmann and psychologists such as Manfred Spitzer the extreme forms of sport are discussed.

== Production ==
The documentary was shot in the United States, France, Norway, Germany, Austria South Tyrol. The film crew accompanied Gerhard Gulewicz three times at the Race Across America, Guillaume Néry at its World Championships in Kalamata and Halvor Angvik on his flights at Monte Brento, Lauterbrunnen and throughout Norway.

The film was sponsored by the Österreichisches Filminstitut, ORF film & TV Agreement and the "Filmstandort Austria" (FISA).
