= Umberto Pelizzari =

Italian freediver

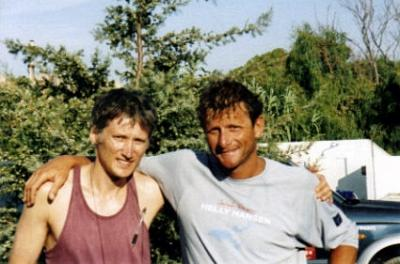
- Umberto Pelizzari in 2008
- Born: August 28, 1965 (age 59); Busto Arsizio, Italy
- Occupation(s): Professional freediver, lecturer, TV host

Umberto Pelizzari (born August 28, 1965) is an Italian freediver, widely considered among the best of all time. Of his era, he is the sole person to have established world records in all the then existing disciplines of freediving.

== Early life ==
Pelizzari was born in the Lombardian city Busto Arsizio. He debuted as a child in professional swimming, moving to freediving at age 19.

== Sportive achievements ==
At 1.89 metres (6 ft 2 in) and 84 kilograms (185 lb), In 1990 Pelizzari obtained the world record in the respected discipline Constant Weight with 65 metres (213 ft), while in the following year establishing his first record in the Variable Weight discipline with 95 metres (312 ft). On October 26 of the same year he pushed himself to 118 metres (387 ft) to set a new world record in the No Limits discipline.

All through the 1990s Pelizzari became famous for his sportive rivalry with the time's other world top freediver, Cuban Francisco "Pipin" Ferreras, originally a close training friend around 1990. Particularly in No-Limits, Pelizzari and Ferreras pushed each other deeper and deeper, and subsequently Pelizzari enhanced his measures to establish round markers in Constant Weight with 80 metres (260 ft), and in No Limits with 150 metres (490 ft), both these at the same event in October 1999.

The rivalry of Pelizzari and Ferreras became the focus of the 2001 IMAX production Ocean Men: Extreme Dive, directed by renowned under water photographer Bob Talbot.

Pelizzari was one of a handful of instigators behind the respected freediving organization AIDA which formed in 1994. Twice, in 1996 and 2001, Pelizzari became AIDA World Champion with the Italian national team. In 2001, Pelizzari concluded his athletic career with a Variable Weight record of 131 metres (430 ft) and retired thereafter.

== Post-athletic life ==
Pelizzari is currently professor at the Scuola Superiore Sant'Anna di Pisa and a TV host. He has also formed the freediving training agency Apnea Academy which sees much respect in freediving circuits, and co-authored the widely used Manual of Freediving with his former trainer Stefano Tovaglieri.
