= British Freediving Association =

British affiliate to AIDA International

The British Freediving Association (BFA, also known as AIDA-UK) is an organisation established in the United Kingdom during 1999 to promote the safe practice of both competition and recreational freediving. It is the British affiliate of AIDA International. The BFA is the sole body that selects teams for international competitions conducted by AIDA International and ratifies any UK record attempts. It has an inland training centre at Vobster Quay in Somerset.

The British Freediving Association organises UK Freediving pool and depth competitions every year. The Great Northern pool competition was hosted by ApneistsUK who have hosted the Pool Championships in 2010, 2011, 2012, 2013 and 2014. The last depth competition was 2012.

The organisation has a small membership, with 132 members recorded in October 2009.

== See also ==
- AIDA International – Worldwide rule- and record-keeping body for competitive breath-hold events
