= Nordic Deep =

Freediving competition in Lysekil, Sweden

Nordic Deep is the warmest coldwater freediving competition in the world. Located in Lysekil, Sweden. The depth is >90m.
