= Loïc Leferme =

French freediving record breaker

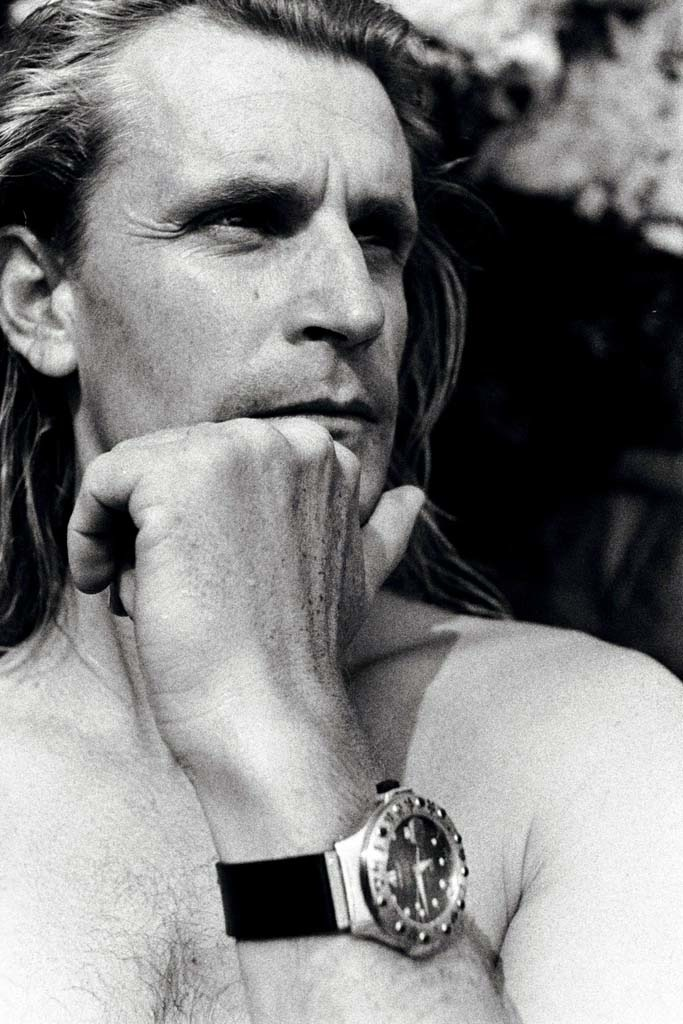
- Born: 28 August 1970; Malo-les-Bains
- Died: 11 April 2007 (aged 36); Villefranche-sur-Mer
- Occupation: freediver
- Children: 2

Loïc Leferme (28 August 1970 – 11 April 2007) was a French diver who was the world free diving record holder until 2 October 2005, when he was surpassed by Herbert Nitsch. Loic was also a founder of AIDA in 1990 with Roland Specker and Claude Chapuis in Nice. In 2002 he set the world free diving record without any breathing apparatus at 162 meters (531 ft). His first world record was 137 meters (449 ft), set in 1999. On 30 October 2004, he extended his own world record to 171 meters (561 ft) in the no-limits free-diving category. The premier advocate of this type of freediving which has come to be known as Chapuis Style Freediving.

He died during a private training session in Villefranche-sur-Mer when his equipment failed and he did not reach the surface in time. He was in training for a planned record attempt in July 2007.
