= Francisco Ferreras =

Cuban freediver also known as "Pipin"

Francisco Rodriguez
- Born: January 18, 1962 (age 64); Matanzas, Cuba
- Other name: Francisco "Pipin" Ferreras
- Occupation: Professional Freediver
- Spouses: Audrey Mestre 1999–2002, Juscelina Cacau Melo 2012

Francisco Rodriguez, better known as Francisco 'Pipin' Ferreras (born January 18, 1962) is a Cuban free-diver known for his achievements in deep free diving and his relationship with his wife, Audrey Mestre.

== Life ==
Ferreras was born in Matanzas, on the northern coast of Cuba, and began to practice free-diving at the age of 5. "Pipin" was his nickname from childhood, and years later he added Ferreras.

He began his underwater career in the little known sport of spearfishing. Pipin was introduced to the sport of free diving by some Italians who were visiting Cuba. They immediately recognized his talent. He fell in love with the sport and soon realized that, while spearfishing and diving for black coral, he routinely went as deep as the free diving champions. He decided to start competing in the sport and established his first world record at the age of 27. That was only the first of the 21 different world records he has set. From the late 1980s and onward he made a name of himself in the so-called "No-Limits"' discipline of freediving where he established his first known world record of 112 meters (367 ft) depth in November 1989. Shortly thereafter he defected to Italy and later migrated to Florida, United States. Through the 1990s he established a long series of World Records, often in close rivalry with Italian Umberto Pelizzari. During this phase, Ferreras' last logged record dive reached a depth of 162 meters (531 ft) in January 2000, 12 meters (39 ft) deeper than Pelizzari's deepest record.

The rivalry of Ferreras and Pelizzari became the focus of the 2001 IMAX production Ocean Men: Extreme Dive, directed by renowned under water photographer Bob Talbot.

In 1996, Ferreras established the sports association International Association of Freedivers (IAFD) in direct opposition to the organization AIDA, but this had limited sportive success and closed in 2004. All of Ferreras' record dives of this era were conducted within the ambit of IAFD.

== Relationship with Audrey Mestre ==
Ferreras had two defunct marriages behind him when in 1996, he met French-born Mexican-national Audrey Mestre who was also a freediver herself. In 1999 they married, and quickly the two became a regular record-breaking couple in the sport of freediving, dividing men and women's records between them.

On October 12, 2002, Mestre died during an early attempt to break the 160 meters (520 ft) no-limits world record that Tanya Streeter had established a few weeks before on August 17, 2002 (it was at the time both men and women's official AIDA record), in a setup that did not match common freediving safety standards. Much of the diving community critique went to Ferreras who had hurried an underfunded organisation for this new record attempt that was previously planned at a later date, notably with too few safety divers, lacking proper rescue equipment, with no doctors at sea and shore. In a no-limits freedive, the standard diving method is holding on to a weighted sled to the target depth, and there open a pressurized air tank that fills a large inflatable balloon which carries the freediver back to the surface. On Mestre's fatal dive, this air tank was empty when Mestre reached her target depth of 171 meters (561 ft). Ferreras was in charge of Mestre's air tank and did not allow any of the team to check that the tank had been charged. Mestre was not recovered to the surface until nine minutes into her dive. She had a pulse at the surface, but there were no medical doctors available to treat her and minutes were wasted with Ferreras attempting to resuscitate her in the water. It was Ferreras who dove from the surface in scuba gear and recovered Mestre's passed-out body.

A year after her death, Ferreras completed a no-limits dive to match Mestre's depth of 171 meters (561 ft).

== Relationship with Nina Ferreras ==
On June 21, 2012, in Miami, Florida, Pipin married Juscelina Cacau Melo, a Canadian former South Beach model, also known in the diving world as Nina Ferreras.

== The Dive ==
After Audrey's death, Ferreras produced a book, ghost-written by Linda Robertson, The Dive.

In 2004, James Cameron acquired the movie rights and was to co-produce and possibly direct the film, with the script written by Dana Stevens. Martin Campbell was later announced to direct with J. Michael Straczynski writing the script. Oscar-winning actress Jennifer Lawrence was announced in January 2015 as being cast to play Audrey Mestre. Francis Lawrence, director of The Hunger Games, would replace Campbell as director. Stevens also returned to provide rewrites. The film was scheduled to be released in 2017 but by September 2022 nothing has been announced.

ESPN Films produced a documentary entitled "No Limits - The Audrey Mestre Documentary", written and directed by Alison Ellwood that covers the sport of no limits diving, Audrey Mestre's diving and her relationship with Pepin Ferreras and his management of his wife's fatal dive. That documentary can be found on YouTube.

== Records established ==
During his career, Francisco "Pipin Ferreras" Rodriguez has established a number of IAFD records (his own sports association that he created in opposition to AIDA), which presents a total of 21 registered world records and 41 overall world records.

Constant weight ( descent and ascent without auxiliaries )

On 1990 – 63 meters. On 1992 – 68 meters.

Variable weight ( descent with ballast of 30 kg and lift arms )

On 1990 – 92 meters. On 1993 – 96 meters.

Tilting absolute "no limits " ( descent with ballast from the free weight and lift with ball )

On 1989 – 112 meters. On 1991 – 115 meters. On 1992 – 120 meters. On 1993 – 125 meters. On 1994 – 126 meters. On 1994 – 127 meters. On 1995 – 128 meters. On 2000 – 162 meters. On 2003 – 170 meters.

Ferreras' last record setting dive was to 171 meters in 2003. He refused to go any deeper at the time, as he only wanted to match his late wife's (Audrey Mestre) last and deepest dive, in honor of her memory.
