= Audrey Mestre =

French world record-setting freediver

- Born: 11 August 1974; Saint-Denis, Seine-Saint-Denis, Île-de-France
- Died: October 12, 2002 (aged 28); Bayahibe, Dominican Republic
- Occupations: Marine biologist, professional free-diver
- Spouse: Francisco Rodriguez aka. Francisco "Pipin" Ferreras 1999-2002

Audrey Mestre (11 August 1974 – 12 October 2002) was a French world record-setting freediver.

== Early life ==
Mestre was born in Saint-Denis, Seine-Saint-Denis, to a family of snorkeling and scuba diving enthusiasts. She was still in her teens when her family moved to Mexico City and, fluent in the Spanish language, she eventually studied marine biology at a university in La Paz, Mexico.

== Relationship with Francisco "Pipín" Ferreras ==
In 1996 her interest in underwater sports led to her meeting free-diver Francisco "Pipín" Ferreras. They developed a relationship and Mestre soon moved to Miami, Florida to live with Ferreras. There, she took up serious free-diving and with Ferreras as her instructor was soon reaching record depths. In 1999, the two diving aficionados got married and the following year, off the coast of Fort Lauderdale, Audrey Mestre broke the female world record by free diving to a depth of 125 meters (410 ft) on a single breath of air. A year later she broke her own record, by descending to 130 meters (427 ft).

== Death ==
In October 2002, Mestre died in an early attempt to break the 160 meters NLT (No Limit) free-diving AIDA International's world record that Tanya Streeter had established a few weeks before on August 17, 2002 (at that time this was both men and women's official AIDA record). Prior to Streeter's dive, the record was 154 meters, held by Loïc Leferme (France) in 2001. Just two months later, on October 20, 2002, Loïc Leferme reclaimed the record for men with a dive to 162 meters.

On October 4, 2002, with a dive team under her husband's supervision, she made a practice dive off Bayahibe Beach in the Dominican Republic to a record depth of 166 meters (545 ft). After more deep dive practices, on October 12 she prepared to attempt a dive to 171 meters. On reaching 171 meters she opened the valve on the air tank to inflate the lift bag which would raise her rapidly to the surface but the cylinder had no air in it. A rescue diver arrived and inflated the lift bag with his air supply but the bag did not rise fast enough due to insufficient inflation, a strong current, and the riser rope being non-vertical. A dive that should have been no more than three minutes resulted in her remaining underwater for more than eight and a half minutes. By the time her husband put on scuba gear and dived down to bring her unconscious body to the surface it was too late and she was pronounced dead at a hospital on shore.

The dive was controversial and heavily criticized as the setup did not match common freediving safety standards. Much of the diving community's critique targeted her husband Ferreras, who had hurried an underfunded organization for this record attempt. The attempt had been previously planned for a later date, and had too few safety divers, not enough proper rescue equipment, and no doctors at sea or shore. Ferreras was in charge of Mestre's lift bag air tank and did not allow any members of the team to check that the tank had been filled. Mestre was not recovered to the surface until nine minutes into her dive. She had a pulse at the surface, but there were no medical doctors available to treat her and minutes were wasted with Ferreras attempting to resuscitate her in the water. A 2003 article, written by Gary Smith for Sports Illustrated, titled "Rapture of the Deep," chronicled the dramatic rise and ultimate tragedy of Mestre. An ESPN documentary film written and directed by Alison Ellwood in 2013 included video footage of the incident and interviews with crew members and staff.

== Awards and accolades ==
Audrey Mestre was cremated, her ashes scattered at sea. In 2002, she was inducted posthumously into the Women Divers Hall of Fame, and in August 2004 a book that tells her story was written by her husband and published under the title The Dive: A Story of Love and Obsession (ISBN 0-06-056416-4).

In 2013, Mestre's life and career were chronicled in ESPN's No Limits as part of their Nine for IX series.
