= Sponge diving =

Diving to gather natural sponges

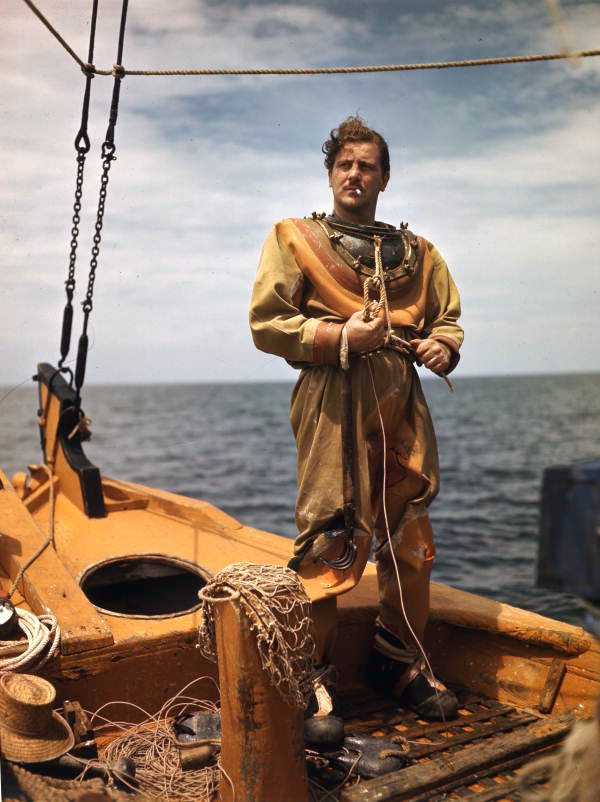
Sponge diver putting on his diving suit in Tarpon Springs, Florida.

Sponge diving is underwater diving to collect soft natural sponges for human use.

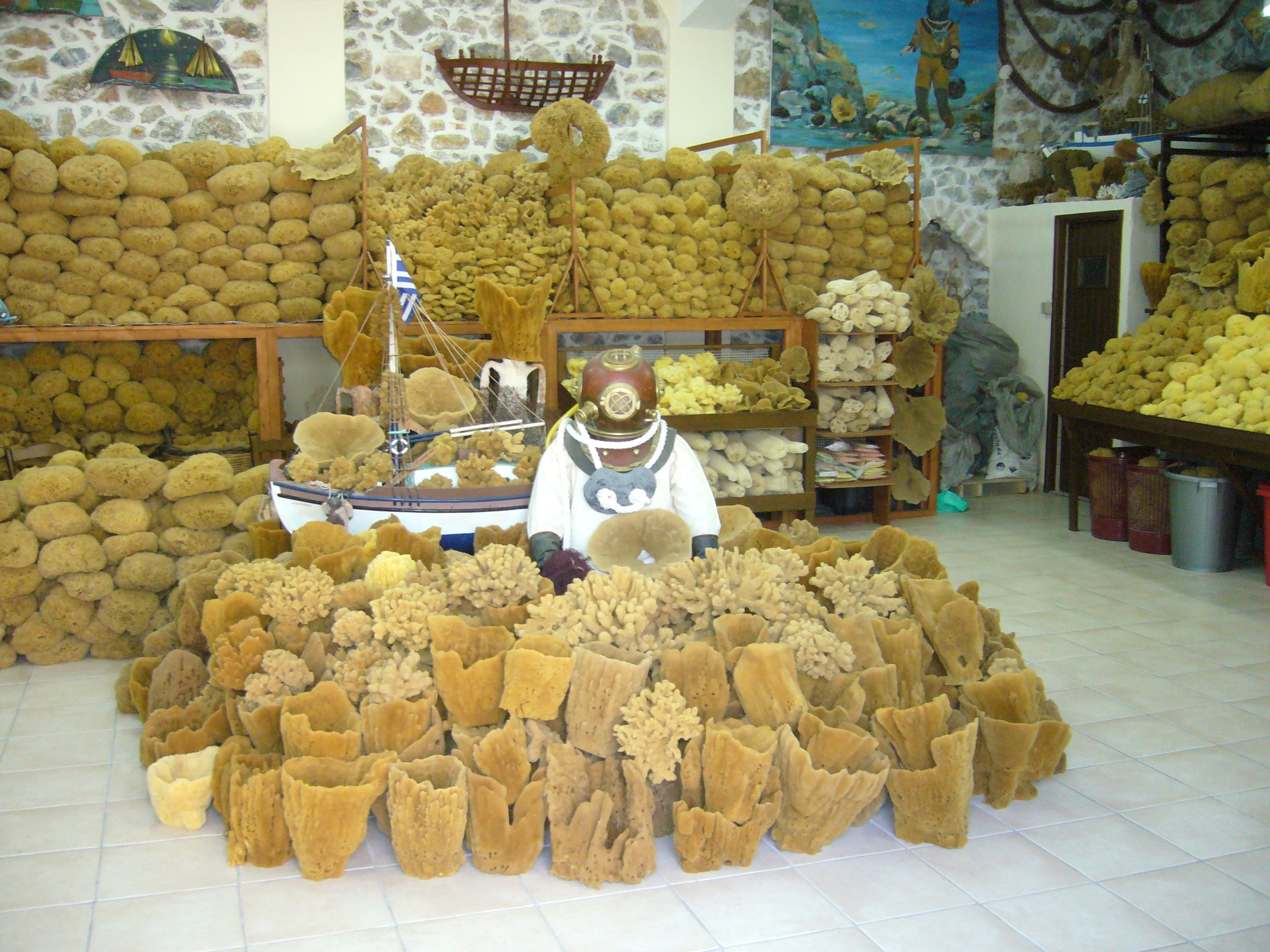
Display of natural sponges for sale on Kalymnos in Greece

== Background ==
Most sponges are too rough for general use due to their structural spicules composed of calcium carbonate or silica. But two genera, Hippospongia and Spongia, have soft, entirely fibrous skeletons. These two genera are most commonly used by humans.

It is unknown when exactly the sponge became an article of use. In Ancient Greek writings, Homer and Plato mentioned the sponge as an object used for bathing. Through trading, Europeans used soft sponges for many purposes including padding for helmets, portable drinking utensils and municipal water filters. Until the invention of synthetic sponges, they were used as cleaning tools, applicators for paints and ceramic glazes, and discreet contraceptives. However, by the mid-20th century, over-fishing had brought both the animals and the industry close to extinction.

Many objects with sponge-like textures are now made of substances not derived from poriferans. Synthetic "sponges" include: personal and household cleaning tools, breast implants, and contraceptive sponges.

== History ==
In Kalymnos, only 18% of the steep volcanic land could be cultivated, so the main occupations were trading, boat building and sponge fishing, which perhaps was the oldest occupation on the island. Diving for sponges brought social and economic development to the island: the freediving method was originally used. Kalymnos was the main centre of sponge production in the Aegean, and sponge diving is still a traditional albeit less common occupation of the Greeks on the island, with related exhibitions, along with other local folklore, and three museums about the occupation.

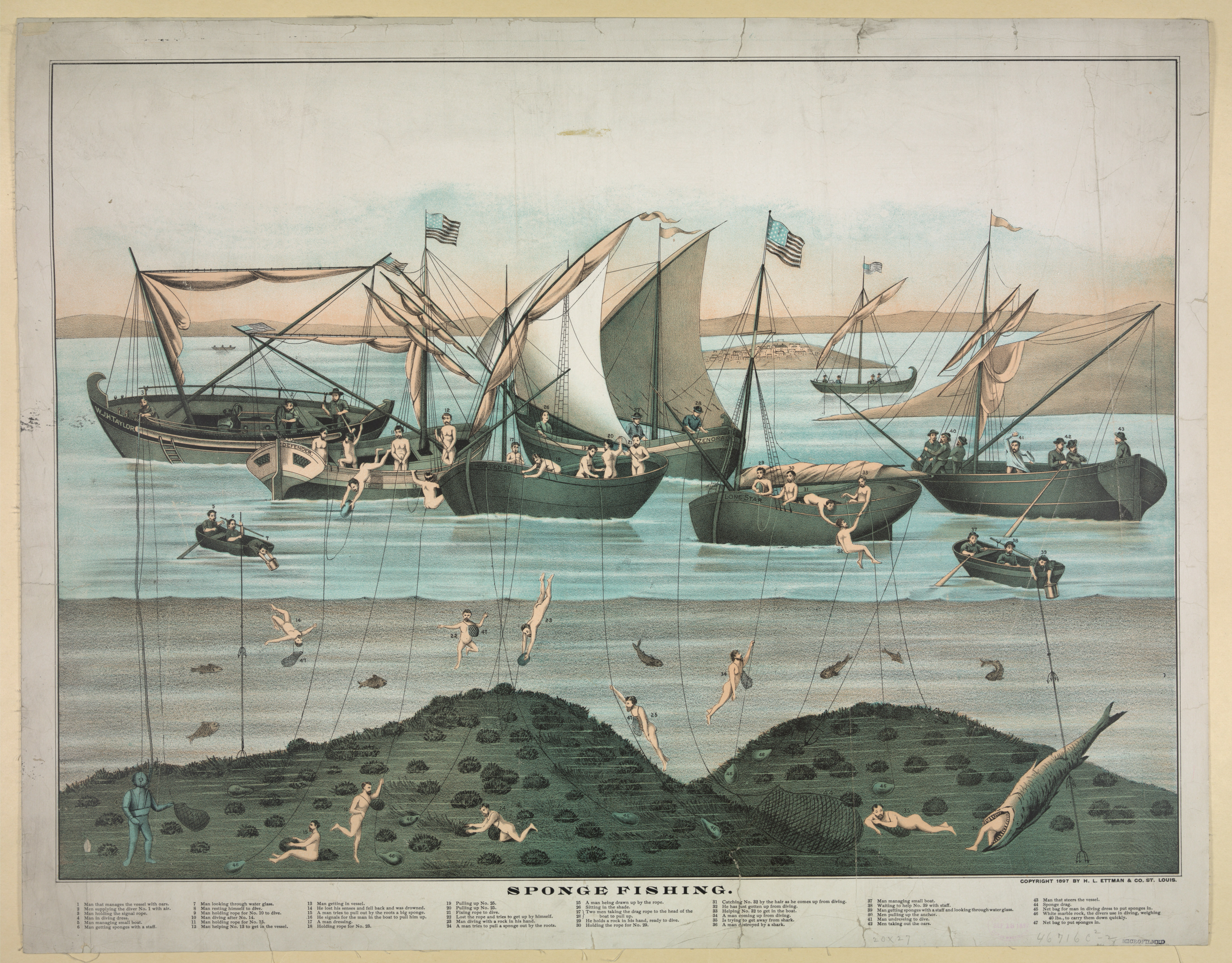
1897 schematic of commercial sponge diving

When sponge diving, the crew went out into the Mediterranean Sea in a small boat, and used a cylindrical box with a glass bottom to search the sea floor for sponges. When one was found, a diver went overboard to get it. Freediving, he was usually naked and carried a 15 kilograms (33 lb) skandalopetra, a rounded stone tied on a rope to the boat, to take him down to the bottom quickly. The diver then cut the sponge loose from the bottom and put it into a net bag. Depth and bottom time depended on the diver's lung capacity. They often went down about 30 metres (100 ft) for up to 5 minutes.

When the Greek sponge divers started using surface supplied standard diving suits (locally called scaphandro) in 1865 the death and injury rate from decompression sickness was extremely high as the procedures for safe decompression were as yet unknown. Some estimates put the death toll at around 10,000 Mediterranean divers in the first 50 years of surface supplied diving.

French Navy physician Alfred Le Roy de Mericourt reported that in 1867, the suppliers of the diving suits reported that out of 24 divers using 12 scaphandros, 10 died during the season. By 1868 the Italian doctor Alphonse Gul observed that three divers would share a suit, and of the thirty divers at Kalymnos, two died and two were paralysed that year. The improvement in fatality rate was ascribed to the reduced daily diving time resulting from sharing the suits.
