= Nanja van den Broek =

Dutch diver

Nanja van den Broek (born 4 November 1975) is a Dutch world record holder freediver in the discipline Variable Weight.

== Freedive career ==
Nanja van den Broek started freediving in 2001 and in her first competition she immediately set two national records, in the disciplines static and dynamic with fins.

On 31 May 2014, she was the first Dutch male or female to make a freedive to -100 meters (in the discipline No Limits). On 18 October 2015, she set a new world record in the discipline Variable Weight with a dive to -130 meters. She was the first to break a record of the late Natalia Molchanova. This record is also her 30th national record.
