= Alexey Molchanov =

Russian freediver (born 1987)

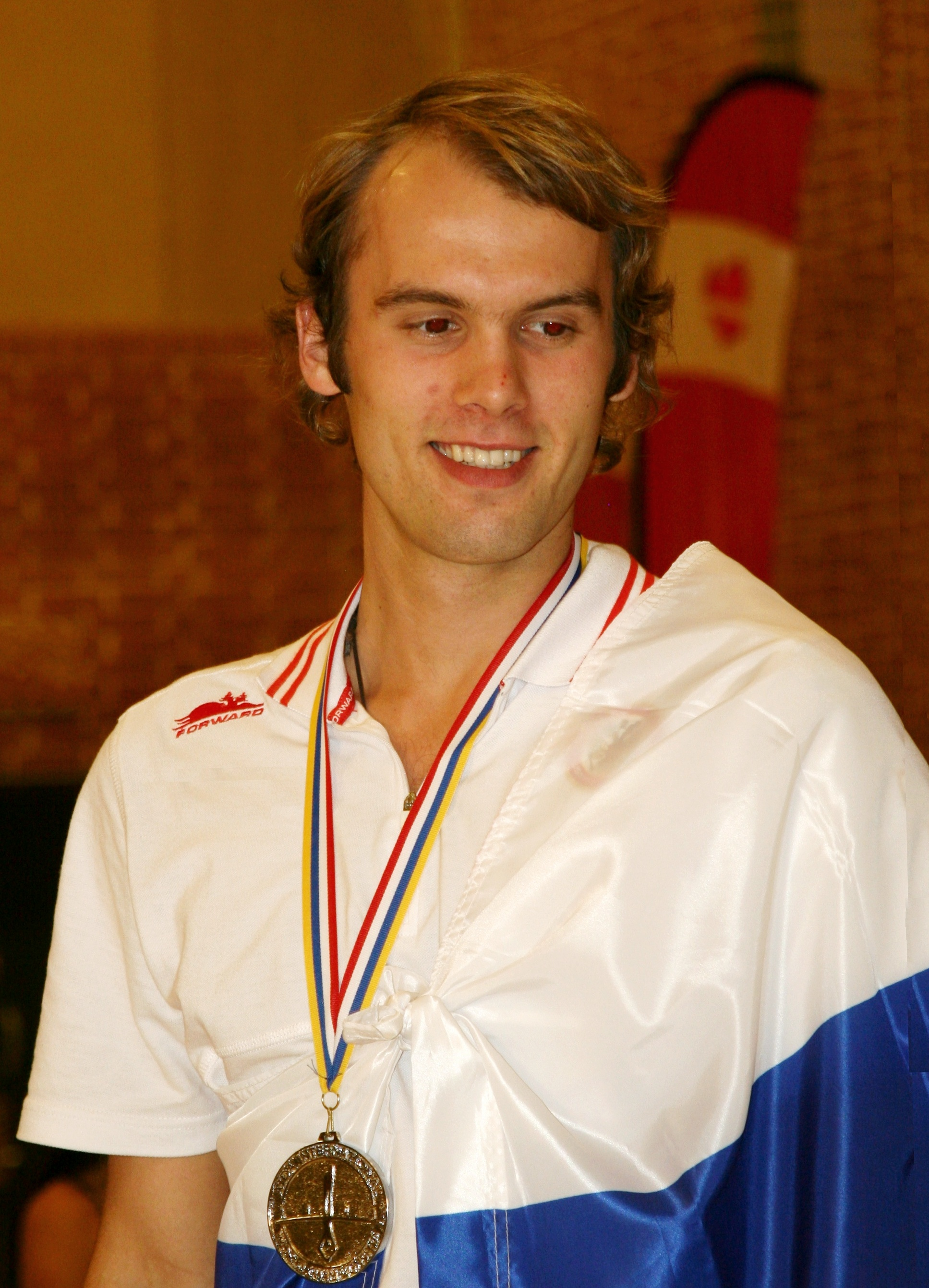

Personal information
- Nationality: Russian
- Born: 6 March 1987 (age 39) Volgograd, Russia

Sport
- Sport: Freediving
Medal record
Men's freediving
World Games
Silver medal – second place	2025 Chengdu	DYN
World Championships
Bronze medal – third place	Lausanne 2005	STA
Bronze medal – third place	Lausanne 2005	DYN
Silver medal – second place	Lausanne 2005	DNF
Silver medal – second place	AIDA World Championship (Maribor 2007)	DYN
Silver medal – second place	AIDA World Championship (Maribor 2007)	DNF
Silver medal – second place	4th AIDA Individual World Championship	CNF
Silver medal – second place	Aarhus 2009	STA
Silver medal – second place	Bahamas 2009	CWT
Gold medal – first place	Kalamata, Greece 2013	CWT
Gold medal – first place	Sardinia, Italy 2014	CWT
Bronze medal – third place	Kalamata, Greece 2016	CWT
Gold medal – first place	Limassol, Cyprus 2015	CNF
Gold medal – first place	Limassol, Cyprus 2015	CWT
Gold medal – first place	Kaş, Turkey 2018	CWT
Gold medal – first place	Kaş, Turkey 2018	FIM
Gold medal – first place	Roatán, Honduras 2019	CNF
Gold medal – first place	Roatán, Honduras 2019	CWTB
Gold medal – first place	Roatán, Honduras 2019	CWT
Gold medal – first place	Roatán, Honduras 2019	FIM
Gold medal – first place	Sharm El-Sheikh, Egypt 2020	CWTB
Gold medal – first place	Limassol, Cyprus 2021	CWTB
Gold medal – first place	Limassol, Cyprus 2021	FIM
Gold medal – first place	Limassol, Cyprus 2021	CWT
Gold medal – first place	Kaş, Turkey 2021	CWT
Gold medal – first place	Kaş, Turkey 2021	FIM
Gold medal – first place	BonAbyss 2023	VWT
Gold medal – first place	BonAbyss 2023	VWT
Gold medal – first place	AIDA Oceanquest Philippines 2023	CWTB
Gold medal – first place	10th Outdoor French CMAS Championship	CWT
Gold medal – first place	Vertical Blue 2023	FIM
Gold medal – first place	Vertical Blue 2023	CWT
Gold medal – first place	Roatán, Honduras	CWT
Gold medal – first place	Roatán, Honduras	CNF
Gold medal – first place	Roatán, Honduras	CWTB
Gold medal – first place	AIDA World Championship Limassol 2023	CWTB
Gold medal – first place	AIDA World Championship Limassol 2023	CWT
Gold medal – first place	33rd AIDA World Championship, Corsica 2024	CWTB
Gold medal – first place	33rd AIDA World Championship, Corsica 2024	CWT
Gold medal – first place	8th CMAS Freediving World Championship, Kalamata 2024	CWT
Gold medal – first place	8th CMAS Freediving World Championship, Kalamata 2024	CNF
Gold medal – first place	8th CMAS Freediving World Championship, Kalamata 2024	CWTB
Silver medal – second place	UNU AIDA Tampa Bay Challenge 2024	DYN
Gold medal – first place	The World Games Series, Chengdu 2025	DYN
Vertical Blue
Gold medal – first place	Bahamas 2017	CWT
Gold medal – first place	Bahamas 2018	CWT
Gold medal – first place	Bahamas 2018	FIM
Gold medal – first place	Bahamas 2021	FIM
Gold medal – first place	Bahamas 2021	CWT
Gold medal – first place	Bahamas 2021	CNF
Gold medal – first place	Bahamas 2021	CWTB
Gold medal – first place	Bahamas 2023	FIM
Gold medal – first place	Bahamas 2023	CWT

Alexey Olegovich Molchanov (born 6 March 1987) is a Russian free diver. He is multiple world champion in freediving, the current world record holder in various freediving disciplines, president of the Freediving Federation, head of the Natalia Molchanova Freediving School, ambassador for the Lake Baikal Foundation, and the founder and equipment designer for the Molchanovs freediving brand. He is the son of Natalia Molchanova, a multiple world champion and freediving record holder.

== Career ==
Alexey Molchanov set his first freediving world record in 2008, swimming 250 meters underwater in a pool with a monofin on a single breath. Since then, he has focused on depth disciplines and competing in open water.

In 2012, he set a world record in Sharm El-Sheikh, Egypt, diving to 125 meters with a monofin. Later that year, he broke his own record by diving to 126 meters in Dean's Blue Hole in the Bahamas. At the 2013 AIDA World Championship in Kalamata, Greece, he set a new world record of 128 meters. In 2016, he improved it to 129 meters in Baia, and in 2018, he achieved 130 meters in the Bahamas, once again surpassing his own mark. This achievement was featured in the Netflix sports documentary series Religion of Sports. In 2021, during the Vertical Blue competition, he extended the record to 131 meters. In August 2023, at the CMAS World Championship, Molchanov reached a depth of 136 meters, setting another absolute depth record in competitive freediving, a performance he confirmed in September under AIDA rules.

Originally a competitive swimmer, Alexey began freediving in his teens when his mother, Natalia Molchanova, was already a champion. She developed a unique instructional method that helped establish her as one of the greatest competitive freedivers in history and contributed significantly to the sport's popularity in Russia. Following in her footsteps, Alexey not only leads the Freediving Federation but also founded Molchanovs, a company that provides education and manufactures freediving gear.

== Personal life ==
From 2016 to 2024, he was married to Elena Molchanova (née Sokolova), a Russian swimmer, Universiade champion (2013), and participant in the 2008 Summer Olympics and 2012 Summer Olympics. She holds the title of International Master of Sports of Russia.

Children: Maksim Alexeyevich Molchanov (born 17 February 2021).

== Personal bests ==
- STA (Static Apnea) — 8 minutes 33 seconds
- DYN (Dynamic Apnea with Monofin) — 300 meters
- DNF (Dynamic Apnea without Fins) — 200 meters
- CWT (Constant Weight with Monofin) — 136 meters
- CWTB (Constant Weight with Bi-Fins) — 126 meters
- CNF (Constant Weight without Fins) — 100 meters
- FIM (Free Immersion) — 133 meters
- CWTi (Constant Weight under Ice) — 90 meters
- VWT (Variable Weight) — 156 meters

== Filmography ==
- One Breath (2020)
- Religions of Sports (2018)
- Breath of the Deep (2024)
- Freediver (2024)

== Records and medals ==
Apnea	Date	Place	Event	Record	Stands as
DYN	19 April 2004	Moscow	freediving Russian Championship	158 m	Russian record
FIM	23 November 2004	Egypt	Open Swedish freediving competitions	66 m	Russian record
VWT	30 November 2004	Egypt	Registration of records in Blue Hole	76 m	Russian record
DNF	23 April 2005	Moscow	freediving Russian Championship	107 m	Russian record
DYN	24 April 2005	Moscow	freediving Russian Championship	171 m	Russian record
DYN	25 August 2005	Lausanne, Switzerland	first individual freediving World Championship	199 m	Russian record, bronze medal
STA	26 August 2005	Lausanne, Switzerland	first individual freediving World Championship	6 min. 31 sec.	Russian record
DNF	27 August 2005	Lausanne, Switzerland	first individual freediving World Championship	124 m	Russian record
DNF	27 August 2005	Lausanne, Switzerland	first individual freediving World Championship	131 m	Russian record, silver medal
CWT	1 September 2005	France, Nice	freediving World Championship	82 m	Russian record
CNF	7 November 2005	Egypt, Dahab	Triple Depth	52 m	Russian record
DYN	23 April 2006	Moscow	Russian Championship	200 m	Russian record
CNF	30 May 2006	Egypt, Dahab	Triple Depth	60 m	Russian record
CWT	7 December 2006	Egypt, Hurgada	Team World Championship	83 m	Russian record
DYN	9 December 2006	Egypt, Hurgada	Team World Championship	207 m	Russian record
STA	9 June 2007	Moscow	Russian championship	6 min. 59 sec.	Russian record
DYN	5 July 2007	Slovenia, Maribor	freediving World Championship	213 m	Russian record, silver medal
DNF	7 July 2007	Slovenia, Maribor	freediving World Championship	157 m	Russian record, silver medal
CNF	3 November 2007	Egypt, Sharm-el-Sheikh	4th individual freediving World Championship	65 m	Russian record, bronze medal
DYN	27 April 2008	Moscow	open Moscow Cup	222 m	Russian record
CWT	25 July 2008	Greece, Crete, Sugia	International freediving competition: Mediterranean Cup	91 m	Russian record
CWT	27 July 2008	Greece, Crete, Sugia	International freediving competition: Mediterranean Cup	101 m	Russian record
FIM	1 August 2008	Egypt, Dahab	International freediving competition	90 m	Russian record
STA	4 October 2008	Italy, Lignano-Sabbiadoro	European Cup	7min. 31sec.	Russian record
DYN	5 October 2008	Italy, Lignano-Sabbiadoro	European Cup	250 m	World Record, Historic Record
STA	20 August 2009	Danmark, Aarhus	5th Individual freediving World Championship	8 min. 02 sec.	Russian record
STA	21 August 2009	Danmark, Aarhus	5th Individual freediving World Championship	8 min. 31 sec.	Russian record, silver medal
CNF	25 September 2009	Egypt, Sharm-el-Sheikh	International competition Ruler of the depth	80 m	Russian record
CNF	27 September 2009	Egypt, Sharm-el-Sheikh	International competition Ruler of the depth	83 m	Russian record
CWT	1 December 2009	Bahamas, Long Island	6th individual freediving World Championship	102 m	Russian record
CWT	3 December 2009	Bahamas, Long Island	6th individual freediving World Championship	111 m	Russian record, silver medal
FIM	24 September 2011	Greece, Kalamata	7th individual freediving World Championship	100 m	Russian record
CWT	25 November 2012	Bahamas, Long Island		126 m	World record
FIM	29 November 2012	Bahamas, Long Island		107 m	Russian record
CNF	25 April 2013	Egypt, Dahab	Russian National Open Competition, 2013	85 m	Russian record
CNF	27 April 2013	Egypt, Dahab	Russian National Open Competition, 2013	90 m	Russian record, continental record
DNF	27 June 2013	Belgrade	Individual AIDA pool World Championships, 2013	195 m	Russian record
STA	29 June 2013	Belgrade	Individual AIDA pool World Championships, 2013	8:33	Russian record
CWT	19 September 2013	Kalamata	Kalamata Open, 2013	128 m	World record, gold medal
FIM	21 September 2013	Kalamata	Kalamata Open, 2013	110 m	Russian record
CNF	10 November 2013	Long Island, BHS	Vertical Blue, 2013	91 m	Russian record
FIM	16 November 2013	Long Island, BHS	Vertical Blue, 2013	112 m	Russian record
FIM	2 December 2014	Long Island, BHS	Suunto Vertical Blue, Deadmans Caye, 2014	114 m	Russian record
DYN	26 June 2015	Belgrade	Individual AIDA Pool World Championships 2015	258 m	Russian record
CNF	14 September 2015	Limassol	AIDA Individual World Championship 2015	85 m	Gold medal
CWT	16 September 2015	Limassol	AIDA Individual World Championship 2ool Championship 2015 — CMAS	8 m 15 sec	Russian record, gold medal
DYN-BF	15 June 2018	Lignano Sabbiadoro	10th Free Diving Indoor World Championship – CMAS	224,7 m	Russian record
CWT	18 July 2018	Bahamas	Vertical Blue 2018 — AIDA	130 m	World record, gold medal
FIM	24 July 2018	Bahamas	Vertical Blue 2018 — AIDA	125 m	World record, gold medal
CWT	4 October 2018	Kaş, Turkey	3rd FreeDiving World Championship Outdoor 2018 — CMAS	123 m	World record, gold medal
FIM	6 October 2018	Kaş, Turkey	3rd FreeDiving World Championship Outdoor 2018 — CMAS	116 m	World record, gold medal
CWT-BF	21 May 2019	Egypt, Dahab	Russian Open Depth Championship 2019 — AIDA	108 m	World record, gold medal
CWT-BF	5 August 2019	Roatán, Honduras	Caribbean Cup 2019 — AIDA	110 m	World record, gold medal
CNF	7 August 2019	Roatán, Honduras	Outdoor World Championship 2019 — CMAS	85 m	World record, gold medal
CWT	8 August 2019	Roatán, Honduras	Outdoor World Championship 2019 — CMAS	125 m	World record, gold medal
FIM	11 August 2019	Roatán, Honduras	Outdoor World Championship 2019 — CMAS	118 m	World record, gold medal
CWTB	12 September 2020	Krk, Croatia	Adriatic Depth Trophy Competition 2020	111 m	World record, gold medal
CWTB	26 November 2020	Egypt, Sharm-el-Sheikh	Aida Freediving World Competition — AIDA	113 m	World record, gold medal
FIM	13 July 2021	Bahamas	Vertical Blue 2021 – CMAS	126 m	World record, gold medal
CNF	15 July 2021	Bahamas	Vertical Blue 2021 – CMAS	87 m	World record
CWT	17 July 2021	Bahamas	Vertical Blue 2021 – CMAS	131 m	World record, gold medal
CNF	19 July 2021	Bahamas	Vertical Blue 2021 – CMAS	90 m	World record, gold medal
CWTB	22 July 2021	Bahamas	Vertical Blue 2021 – CMAS	118 m	World record, gold medal
CWTB	23 September 2021	Limassol, Cyprus	AIDA World Championship Limassol 2021	115 m	World record, gold medal
FIM	24 September 2021	Limassol, Cyprus	AIDA World Championship Limassol 2021	118 m	Gold medal
CWT	25 September 2021	Limassol, Cyprus	AIDA World Championship Limassol 2021	125 m	Gold medal
CWT	5 October 2021	Kaş, Turkey	5th CMAS Outdoor Freediving World Championships 2021	128 m	Gold medal
FIM	6 October 2021	Kaş, Turkey	5th CMAS Outdoor Freediving World Championships 2021	121 m	Gold medal
VWT	25 March 2023	Bonaire	BonAbyss2023 – AIDA	153 m	World record
VWT	28 March 2023	Bonaire	BonAbyss2023 – AIDA	156 m	World record
CWTB	26 May 2023	Philippines	AIDA Oceanquest Philippines	121 m	World record
CWT	30 June 2023	Villefranche-sur-mer	10th outdoor freediving French championship CMAS	133 m	World record
FIM	21 July 2023	Bahamas	Vertical Blue 2023 – AIDA	133 m	World record
CWT	22 July 2023	Bahamas	Vertical Blue 2023 – AIDA	133 m	World record
CWT	21 August 2023	Roatan, Honduras	CMAS 7th Freediving Depth World Championship	136 m	World record
CNF	24 August 2023	Roatan, Honduras	CMAS 7th Freediving Depth World Championship	100 m	World record
CWTB	25 August 2023	Roatan, Honduras	CMAS 7th Freediving Depth World Championship	124 m	World record
CWTB	24 September 2023	Limassol, Cyprus	AIDA World Championship Limassol 2023	123 m	World record
CWT	29 September 2023	Limassol, Cyprus	AIDA World Championship Limassol 2023	136 m	World record
CWTB	10 September 2024	Corsica	33rd AIDA Freediving World Championship	125 m	World record
DNF	29 March 2025	Chengdu, China	The World Games 2025 Freediving	200 m	Silver Medal
DYN	30 March 2025	Chengdu, China	The World Games 2025 Freediving	300 m	Russian record, Gold medal
CWTB	10 September 2024	Corsica	33rd AIDA Freediving World Championship	125 m	World record
DNF	29 March 2025	Chengdu, China	The World Games 2025 Freediving	200 m	Silver Medal
DYN	30 March 2025	Chengdu, China	The World Games 2025 Freediving	300 m	Russian record, Gold medal
CWTB	26 September 2025	Limassol, Cyprus	AIDA World Championship Limassol 2025	126 m	World record
FIM	19 August 2026	Roatan, Honduras	2026 CMAS World Championship	133 m	World record

Summary:

- STA – 8 min. 33 sec.
- DYN – 300 m
- DNF – 200 m
- CWT – 136 m
- CWTB — 126 m
- CNF – 100 m
- FIM – 133 m
- CWT ICE – 85 m
- VWT - 156 m

Clarification:

- STA = Static Apnea. Holding the breath as long as possible.
- DYN = Dynamic Apnea with fins. Diving as far as possible with the use of fins or a monofin.
- DNF = Dynamic Apnea without fins. Diving as far as possible without fins.
- CWT = Constant weight with fins. Diving as deep as possible with the use of fins or a monofin.
- CWT ICE = Constant weight with fins under the ice in cold water. Diving as deep as possible with the use of fins or a monofin.
- CNF = Constant weight without fins. Diving as deep as possible without fins.
- FIM = Free Immersion. Diving as deep as possible by pulling down and up the rope.
- VWT = Descent is assisted by a weighted sled sliding down a line, the ascent may be either by:

1.) pulling up along the line or swimming with or without fins under AIDA rules 2.) swimming with fins under CMAS rules.

== Personal bests ==
Discipline		Result	Accreditation
Time	STA	8:33min	AIDA
Distance	DNF	195m	AIDA
Distance	DYN	258m	AIDA
Depth	CNF	100m	CMAS
Depth	CWT	136m	CMAS, AIDA
Depth	CWT BF	124m	CMAS
Depth	FIM	133m	CMAS, AIDA
Depth	CWT ICE	85m	FF
Depth	VWT	156m	AIDA
