= AIDA International =

Worldwide rule- and record-keeping body for competitive breath-hold events

Association Internationale pour le Développement de l'Apnée - AIDA International
- Abbreviation: AIDA
- Formation: 1992
- Type: Sports Federation
- Headquarters: Geneve, Switzerland
- Region served: Worldwide
- Official language: French, English
- President: Saša Jeremić
- Affiliations: EUF
- Website: http://www.aidainternational.org

Association Internationale pour le Développement de l'Apnée (AIDA) (English: International Association for the Development of Apnea) is a worldwide rule- and record-keeping body for competitive breath holding events, also known as freediving. It sets standards for safety, comparability of Official World Record attempts and freedive education. AIDA International is the parent organization for national clubs of the same name. AIDA World Championships are periodically held.

== History ==
AIDA was founded on November 2, 1992, in Nice, France, by Frenchmen Roland Specker, Loïc Leferme and Claude Chapuis, with Specker as its first president. The AIDA Competitions started to take form in 1993. National clubs begin to form over all Europe in 1994–1995. AIDA became AIDA International in 1999.

- In 1999 Sébastien Nagel, of Switzerland, replaced Roland Specker as the president.
- Bill Strömberg, of Sweden, replaced Sébastien Nagel as president in 2005.
- Kimmo Lahtinen, of Finland, replaced Bill Strömberg as president in December 2009.
- Carla Sue Hanson, of the USA, replaced Kimmo Lahtinen as president in 2016.
- Alexandru Russu, of Romania, replaced Carla Sue Hanson as president in 2020.
- Saša Jeremić, of Serbia, replaced Alexandru Russu as president in 2024.

== AIDA World Championships ==
History of AIDA World Championships:

=== Team ===
- 1996: First AIDA Team World Championship in Nice, France, for national teams
- 1998: Second AIDA Team World Championship, Sardinia, Italy
- 2001: Third AIDA Team World Championship, Ibiza, Spain
- 2004: Fourth AIDA Team World Championship, Vancouver, British Columbia, Canada
- 2006: Fifth AIDA Team World Championship, Hurghada, Egypt
- 2008: Sixth AIDA Team World Championship, Sharm el-Sheikh, Egypt
- 2010: Seventh AIDA Team World Championship, Okinawa, Japan
- 2012: Eighth AIDA Team World Championship, Nice, France
- 2014: Ninth AIDA Team World Championship, Cagliari, Italy
- 2016: Tenth AIDA Team World Championship, Kalamata, Greece

=== Individual ===
- 2005: AIDA Individual World Championship, Villefranche-sur-Mer, France
- 2007: AIDA Individual World Championship, Sharm el-Sheikh, Egypt
- 2009: AIDA Individual World Championship, Dean's Blue Hole, Bahamas
- 2011: AIDA Individual World Championship, Kalamata, Greece
- 2013: AIDA Depth World Championship, Kalamata, Greece
- 2013: AIDA Pool World Championship, Belgrade, Serbia
- 2015: AIDA Depth World Championship, Limassol, Cyprus
- 2015: AIDA Pool World Championship, Belgrade, Serbia
- 2016: AIDA Pool World Championship, Turku, Finland
- 2017: AIDA Depth World Championship, Roatan, Honduras
- 2018: AIDA Pool World Championship, Belgrade, Serbia
- 2019: AIDA Depth World Championship, Villefranche sur Mer, France
- 2021: AIDA Depth World Championship, Limassol, Cyprus
- 2022: AIDA Pool World Championship, Burgas, Bulgaria
- 2022: AIDA Depth World Championship, Roatan, Honduras
- 2023: AIDA Pool World Championship, Jeju, South Korea
- 2023: AIDA Depth World Championship, Limassol, Cyprus
- 2024: AIDA Freediving World Championship, Kaunas, Lithuania
- 2025: AIDA Pool World Championship, Wakayama, Japan
- 2025: AIDA Depth World Championship, Limassol, Cyprus

== Qualifications and certifications ==
AIDA has a star system for grading its freediving certifications:

Freedive certifications

- AIDA 1 Star Freediver, 8m CWT, 1'15" STA, 25m DYN.
- AIDA 2 Star Freediver, 12m CWT, 2' STA, 40m DYN.
- AIDA 3 Star Freediver, 24m CWT, 2'45" STA, 55m DYN.
- AIDA 4 Star Freediver, 32m CWT, 3'30" STA, 70m DYN.

Speciality certifications

- Pool Competition Safety Freediver.
- Depth Competition Safety Freediver.
- Advanced Depth Competition Safety Freediver.
- Monofin Freediver.
- Advanced Monofin Freediver.
- Master Monofin Freediver.
- AIDA youth bronze dolphin.
- AIDA youth silver dolphin.
- AIDA youth gold dolphin.

AIDA has 3 levels of Instructor qualifications and certifications:

Instructor certifications

- AIDA Instructor, can teach up to 3 Star Freediver.
- AIDA Master Instructor, can teach up to 4 Star Freediver.
- AIDA Instructor Trainer, can teach all levels, and instructors.

== Records ==
AIDA recognized world records as of February 02, 2026.

=== Pool Disciplines ===
The AIDA recognized pool disciplines are static apnea (STA) and three separate dynamic apnea disciplines. Dynamic With Fins (DYN) which is done with monofins usually but bifins are also allowed, Dynamic With Bifins (DYNB) which uses bifins, and Dynamic Without Fins (DNF) does not allow fins to be used and divers usually use breast strokes and wall-kicks for propulsions.

Discipline	Gender	Name	Nationality	Result	Date
Static Apnea (STA)	Male	Stéphane Mifsud	France	11:35	2009-06-08
Static Apnea (STA)	Female	Heike Schwerdtner	Germany	09:22	2025-05-04
Dynamic With Fins (DYN)	Male	Ming Jin (William Joy)	China	319m	2025-11-09
Dynamic With Fins (DYN)	Female	Zsófia Törőcsik	Hungary	280m	2025-7-02
Dynamic Without Fins (DNF)	Male	Mateusz Malina	Poland	250m	2022-05-01
Dynamic Without Fins (DNF)	Female	Julia Kozerska	Poland	213m	2023-06-13
Dynamic With Bifins (DYNB)	Male	Guillaume Bourdila	France	298m	2025-06-28
Dynamic With Bifins (DYNB)	Female	Zsófia Törőcsik	Hungary	259m	2025-06-28

=== Sea Disciplines ===
Discipline	Gender	Name	Nationality	Result	Date
Constant Weight (CWT)	Male	Alexey Molchanov	Russia	136m	2023-09-29
Constant Weight (CWT)	Female	Alessia Zecchini	Italy	123m	2023-05-24
Constant Weight Without Fins (CNF)	Male	Petar Klovar	Croatia	103m	2025-05-26
Constant Weight Without Fins (CNF)	Female	Kateryna Sadurska	Ukraine	86m	2025-11-23
Constant Weight With Bifins (CWTB)	Male	Alexey Molchanov	Russia	127m	2025-12-01
Constant Weight With Bifins (CWTB)	Female	Alenka Artnik	Slovenia	111m	2023-07-30
Free Immersion (FIM)	Male	Petar Klovar	Croatia	135m	2023-09-27
Free Immersion (FIM)	Female	Sanda Delija	Croatia	103m	2025-05-04
Variable Weight (VWT)	Male	Alexey Molchanov	Russia	156m	2023-03-28
Variable Weight (VWT)	Female	Nanja Van Den Broek	Netherlands	130m	2015-10-18
No Limit (NLT) (no longer recognized)	Male	Herbert Nitsch	Austria	214m	2007-06-09
No Limit (NLT) (no longer recognized)	Female	Tanya Streeter	United States	160m	2002-08-17

== See also ==
- AIDA Hellas – National representative of AIDA International in Greece
- British Freediving Association – British affiliate to AIDA International
- Confédération Mondiale des Activités Subaquatiques – International organisation for underwater activities
