= Freediving =

Underwater diving without breathing apparatus

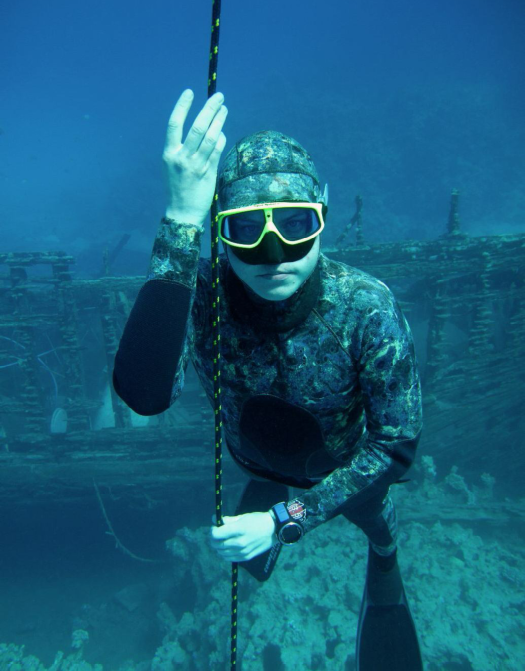
A freediver on the ocean floor

Freediving, free-diving, free diving, or breath-hold diving is a mode of underwater diving that relies on breath-holding (apnea) until resurfacing rather than the use of breathing apparatus such as scuba gear. Historically and colloquially, the term skin diving has been used interchangeably with freediving. However, in modern and recreational context, skin diving generally refers to recreational breath-hold diving at shallow depths to observe marine life, whereas freediving is recognized as a distinct discipline focusing on maximizing underwater breath hold duration, depths, or distance. Competitive freediving has a range of apnea disciplines; in which competitors attempt to attain great depths, times, or distances on a single breath.

Freediving is practiced for a wide variety of recreational, occupational, and sporting purposes. Activities include traditional fishing techniques, spearfishing, underwater photography, synchronised swimming, underwater football, underwater rugby, underwater hockey, underwater target shooting and mermaiding. In addition to the limits imposed by breath-holding, immersion in water and exposure to high ambient pressure also have physiological effects that further restricts the depths and duration achievable in freediving.

== Terminology and etymology ==
Historically, the terms freediving and skin diving were commonly used to describe underwater diving that was performed without surface-supplied breathing apparatus or scuba gear. In older diving literature, free diving was also used to refer to scuba diving, due to the freedom of movement compared with surface-supplied diving.

In modern diving instruction, the terminology has become more specialized. Diver training organization such as PADI distinguish between freediving and skin diving. PADI defines skin diving as a recreational activity similar to snorkeling but involving additional short breath-hold dives (around 5 to 10 metres deep) to take a closer look at marine life, whereas freediving is defined as breath-hold diving practiced as a discipline with the common focus on extending one's dive depth, breath-holding duration, or distance traveled underwater on a single breath.

== History ==
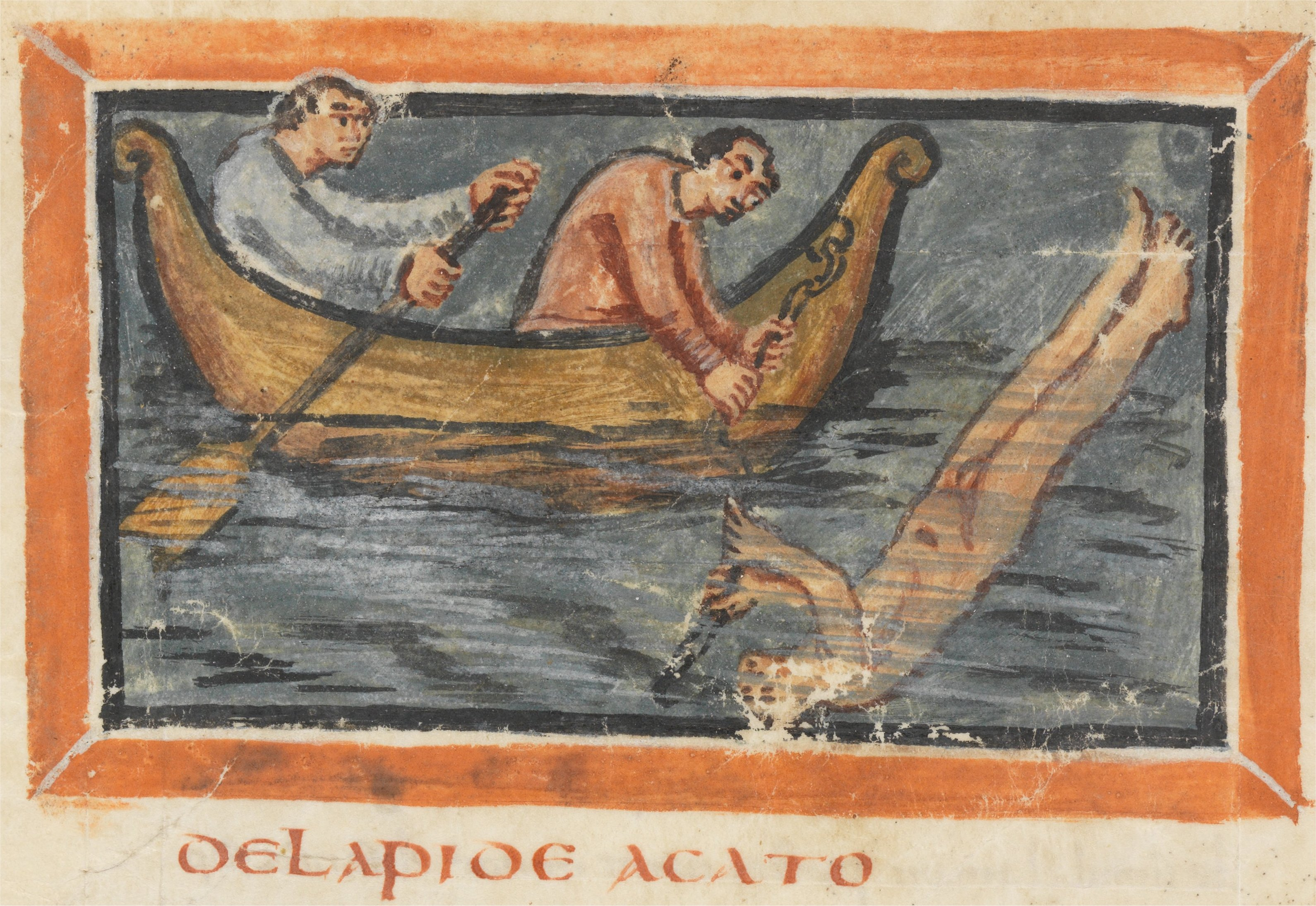
9th century illustration of a pearl diver

In ancient times freediving without the aid of mechanical devices was the only possibility, with the exception of the occasional use of reeds and leather breathing bladders. The divers faced the same problems as divers today, such as blacking out during a breath hold. Freediving was practiced in ancient cultures to gather food, harvest resources such as sponge and pearl, reclaim sunken valuables, and to help aid military campaigns. In Ancient Greece, both Plato and Homer mention the sponge as being used for bathing. The island of Kalymnos was a main centre of diving for sponges. By using weights (skandalopetra) of as much as 15 kilograms (33 lb) to speed the descent, breath-holding divers would descend to depths up to 30 metres (98 ft) to collect sponges. Harvesting of red coral was also done by divers.

The Mediterranean had large amounts of maritime trade. As a result of shipwrecks, particularly in the fierce winter storms, divers were often hired to salvage whatever they could from the seabed.

Divers were also used in warfare. Defenses against sea vessels were often created, such as underwater barricades, and hence divers were often used to scout out the seabed when ships were approaching an enemy harbor. If barricades were found, it was divers who were used to disassemble them, if possible. During the Peloponnesian War, divers were used to get past enemy blockades to relay messages as well as supplies to allies or troops that were cut off, and in 332 BC, during the Siege of Tyre, the city used divers to cut the anchor cables of Alexander's attacking ships.

In Japan, ama divers began to collect pearls about 2,000 years ago. For thousands of years, most seawater pearls were retrieved by divers working in the Indian Ocean, in areas such as the Persian Gulf, the Red Sea, and in the Gulf of Mannar (between Sri Lanka and India). A fragment of Isidore of Charax's Parthian itinerary was preserved in Athenaeus's 3rd-century Sophists at Dinner, recording freediving for pearls around an island in the Persian Gulf.

Pearl divers near the Philippines were also successful at harvesting large pearls, especially in the Sulu Archipelago. At times, the largest pearls belonged by law to the sultan, and selling them could result in the death penalty for the seller. Nonetheless, many pearls made it out of the archipelago by stealth, ending up in the possession of the wealthiest families in Europe. Pearling was popular in Qatar, Bahrain, Japan, and India. The Gulf of Mexico was also known for pearling. Native Americans harvested freshwater pearls from lakes and rivers like the Ohio, Tennessee, and Mississippi, while others dived for marine pearls from the Caribbean and waters along the coasts of Central and South America.

In 1940, Dottie Frazier pioneered freediving for women in the United States and also began teaching classes. It was also during this time that she began to design and sell rubber suits for Navy UDT divers.

== Freediving activities ==
=== Recreational hunting and gathering ===
==== Spearfishing ====
Spearfishing is an ancient method of fishing that has been used throughout the world for millennia. Early civilizations were familiar with the custom of spearing fish from rivers and streams using sharpened sticks.

Modern spearfishing makes use of elastic powered spearguns and slings, or compressed gas pneumatic powered spearguns, to strike the hunted fish. Specialised techniques and equipment have been developed for various types of aquatic environments and target fish. Spearfishing may be done using free-diving, snorkelling, or scuba diving techniques. Spearfishing while using scuba equipment is illegal in some countries. The use of mechanically powered spearguns is also outlawed in some countries and jurisdictions. Spearfishing is highly selective, normally uses no bait and has limited by-catch.

==== Collection of shellfish ====
Various cultures have collected shellfish by freediving for "possibly thousands" of years. One example is the historical recreational collection of abalone in South Africa, before illegal harvesting reduced stocks to levels which resulted in recreational collection being banned indefinitely. This did not completely stop illegal harvesting, because selling illegally harvested abalone remained lucrative.

=== Competitive breath-hold watersports ===
==== Aquathlon ====
Aquathlon (also known as underwater wrestling) is an underwater sport where two competitors wearing masks and fins wrestle underwater in an attempt to remove a ribbon from each other's ankle band in order to win the bout. The "combat" takes place in a 5-metre (16 ft) square ring within a swimming pool, and is made up of three 30-second rounds, with a fourth round played in the event of a tie. The sport originated during the 1980s in the former USSR (now Russia) and was first played at international level in 1993. It was recognised by the Confédération Mondiale des Activités Subaquatiques (CMAS) in 2008.

==== Competitive spearfishing ====
Competitive spearfishing is defined by the world governing body CMAS as "the hunting and capture of fish underwater without the aid of artificial breathing devices, using gear that depends entirely on the physical strength of the competitor." They publish a set of competition rules that are used by affiliated organisations.

==== Synchronised swimming ====
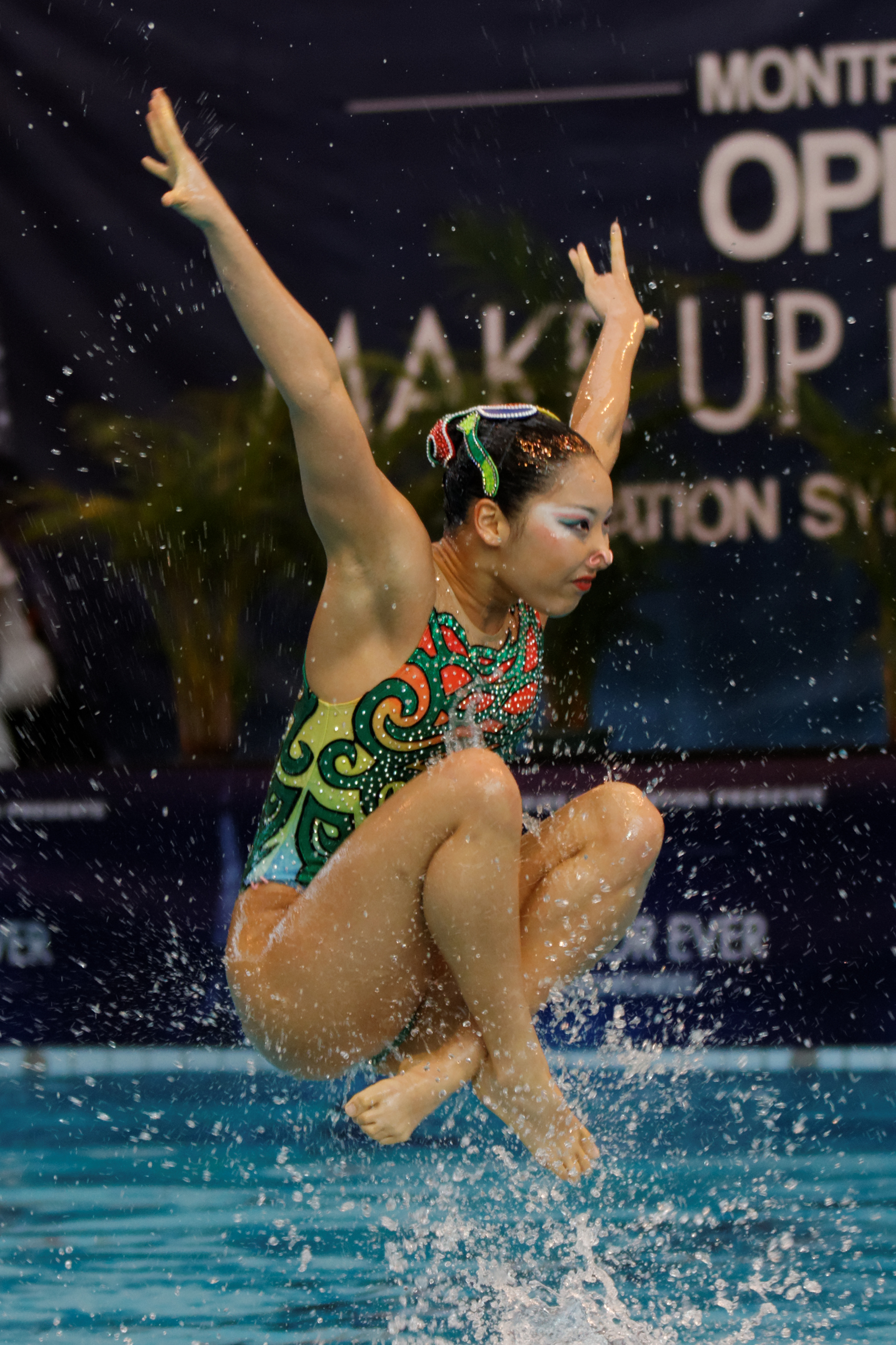
A member of the Japanese team is thrown up in the air by other members under the water during the team's free routine at the 2013 French Open.

Synchronized swimming is a hybrid form of swimming, dance, and gymnastics, consisting of swimmers (either solos, duets, trios, combos, or teams) performing a synchronized routine of elaborate moves in the water, accompanied by music. Synchronized swimming demands advanced water skills, and requires great strength, endurance, flexibility, grace, artistry and precise timing, as well as exceptional breath control when upside down underwater. During lifts swimmers are not allowed to touch the bottom.

Traditionally it was a women's sport, but following the addition of a new mixed-pair event, FINA World Aquatics competitions are open to men since the 16th 2015 championships in Kazan, and the other international and national competitions allow male competitors in every event. However, men are currently still barred from competing in the Olympics. Both USA Synchro and Synchro Canada allow men to compete with women. Most European countries also allow men to compete, and France even allows male only podiums, according to the number of participants. In the past decade, more men are becoming involved in the sport and a global biannual competition called Men's Cup has been steadily growing.

Swimmers perform two routines for the judges, one technical and one free, as well as age group routines and figures. Synchronized swimming is both an individual and team sport. Swimmers compete individually during figures, and then as a team during the routine. Figures are made up of a combination of skills and positions that often require control, strength, and flexibility. Swimmers are ranked individually for this part of the competition. The routine involves teamwork and synchronization. It is choreographed to music and often has a theme. Synchronized swimming is governed internationally by FINA (Fédération Internationale de Natation).

==== Underwater hockey ====
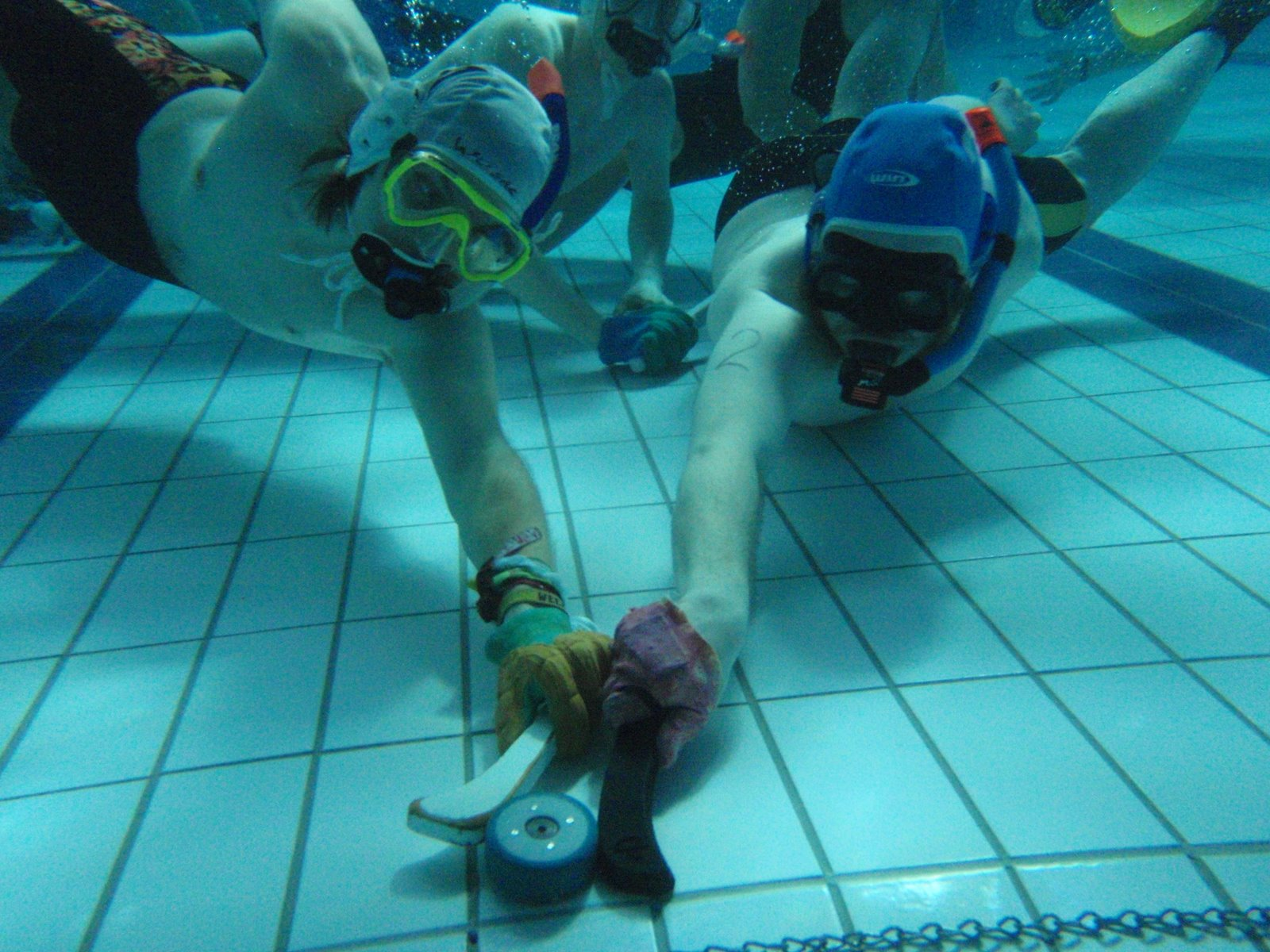
Two players compete for the puck in underwater hockey.

Underwater hockey (also called octopush, mainly in the United Kingdom) is a globally played limited-contact sport in which two teams compete to manoeuvre a hockey puck across the bottom of a swimming pool into the opposing team's goal by propelling it with a hockey stick. The sport originated in England in 1954 when Alan Blake, the founder of the newly formed Southsea Sub-Aqua Club, invented the game he called octopush to keep the club's members interested and active during the cold winter months, when open-water diving is limited. Underwater hockey is now played worldwide, governed by the Confédération Mondiale des Activités Subaquatiques (CMAS). The first Underwater Hockey World Championship was held in Canada in 1980, after a planned championship in 1979 was scuttled by international politics and apartheid.

==== Underwater football ====
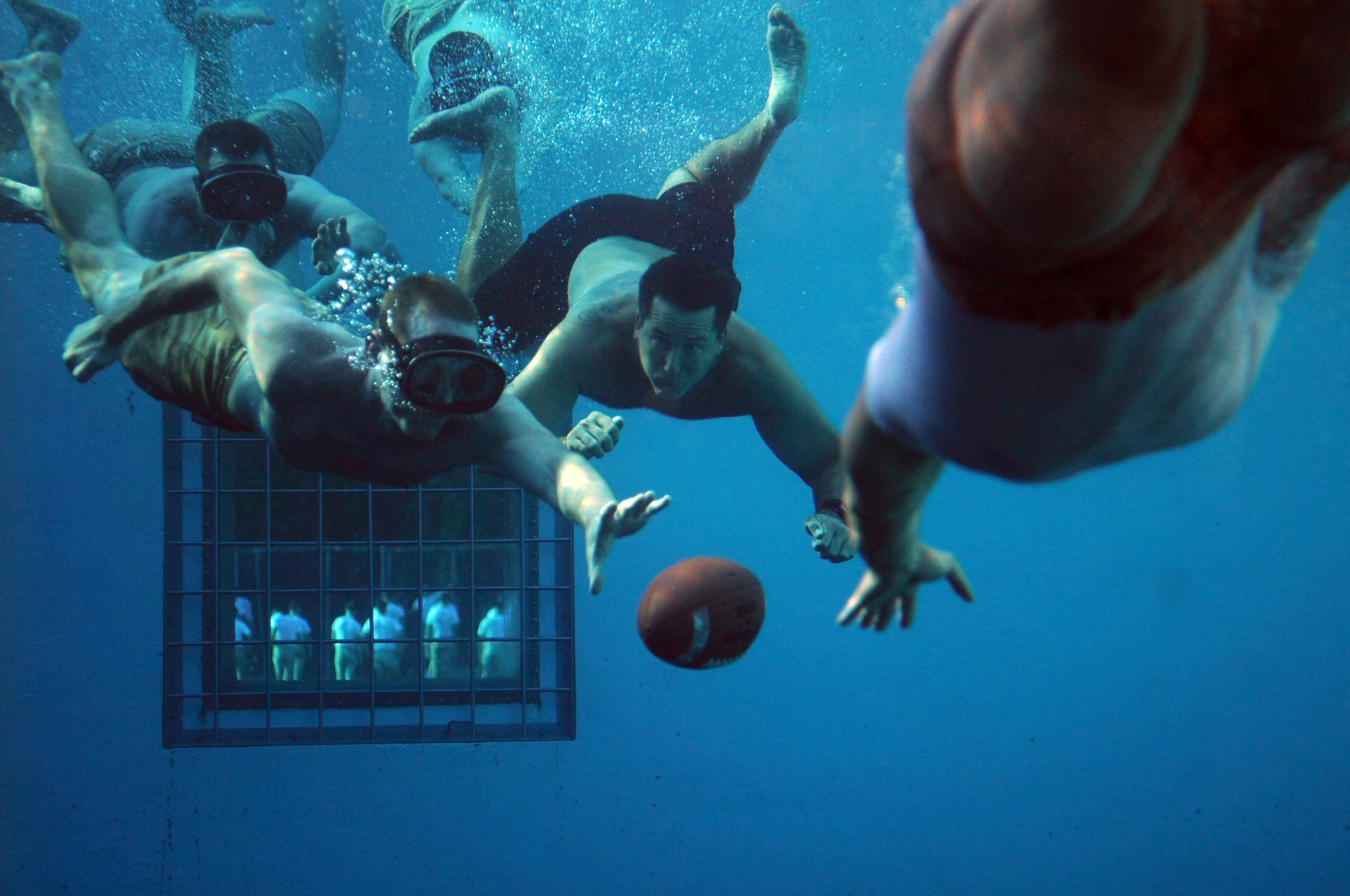
US Navy Students playing underwater football

Underwater football is a two-team underwater sport that shares common elements with underwater hockey and underwater rugby. As with both of those games, it is played in a swimming pool with snorkeling equipment (mask, snorkel, and fins). The goal of the game is to manoeuvre (by carrying and passing) a slightly negatively buoyant ball from one side of a pool to the other by players who are completely submerged underwater. Scoring is achieved by placing the ball (under control) in the gutter on the side of the pool. Variations include using a toy rubber torpedo as the ball, and weighing down buckets to rest on the bottom and serve as goals.

It is played in the Canadian provinces of Alberta, Manitoba, Newfoundland and Labrador, and Saskatchewan.

==== Underwater rugby ====
Underwater rugby is an underwater team sport. During a match, two teams try to score a negatively buoyant ball (filled with saltwater) into the opponents' goal at the bottom of a swimming pool. It originated from within the physical fitness training regime existing in German diving clubs during the early 1960s and has little in common with rugby football except for the name. It was recognised by CMAS in 1978 and was first played as a world championship in 1980.

==== Underwater target shooting ====
Underwater target shooting is an underwater sport that tests a competitors' ability to accurately use a speargun via a set of individual and team events conducted in a swimming pool using free diving or apnea technique. The sport was developed in France during the early 1980s and is currently practised mainly in Europe. It is known as Tir sur cible subaquatique in French and as Tiro al Blanco Subacuático in Spanish.

== Competitive apnea ==
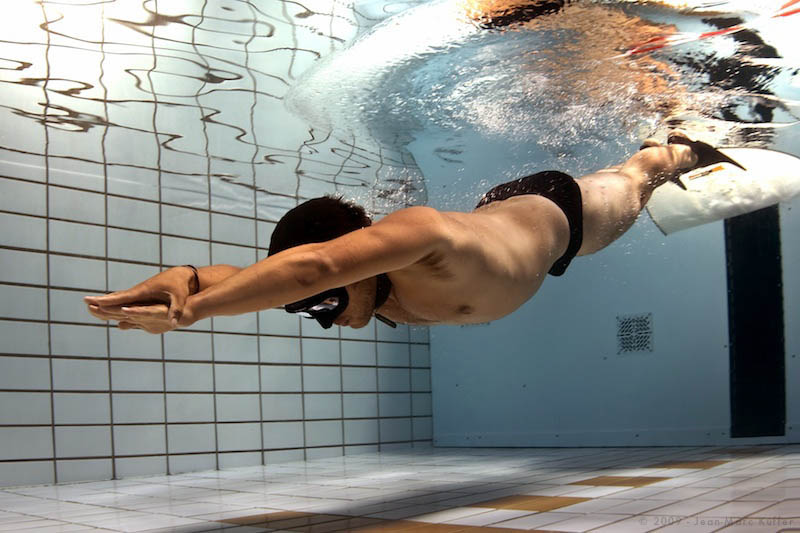
Monofin freediver

Competitive freediving is currently governed by two world associations: AIDA International and Confédération Mondiale des Activités Subaquatiques (CMAS). Historically, there were two more organisations that regulated freediving records and activities — International Association of Freedivers (IAFD) and Freediving Regulations and Education Entity (FREE). Each organization has its own rules on recognizing a record attempt which can be found on the organization's website. Alongside competitive disciplines, there are record disciplines — disciplines that are not held in competitions, that are just for setting world records. There is a third organization, Guinness, which in addition to AIDA and CMAS presides over record disciplines.

Almost all types of competitive freediving are individual sports based on the best individual achievement. Exceptions to this rule are the bi-annual AIDA Team World Championship, where the combined score of the team members makes up the team's total points, and Skandalopetra diving competitions held by CMAS, the only truly 'team' event in freediving for which teams are formed by two athletes: one acting as the diver (βουτηχτής, voutichtis) and the other acting as an assistant (κολαουζέρης, kolaouzeris).

=== Disciplines ===
There are currently eleven recognized disciplines defined by AIDA and CMAS, and a dozen more that are only practiced locally. All disciplines can be practiced by both men and women, and only CMAS currently distinguishes records in fresh water from those at sea. The disciplines of AIDA can be done both in competition and as a record attempt, with the exception of variable weight and no limits, which are both solely for record attempts. For all AIDA depth disciplines, the depth the athlete will attempt is announced before the dive; this is accepted practice for both competition and record attempts. Most divers choose monofin (MF) over bifins (BF) where there is a choice.

Discipline	Measurement	AIDA		CMAS		Description
Discipline	Measurement	open water	pool	open water	pool	Description
Constant weight apnea (CWT)	depth	✓	–	✓	–	Maximum depth following a guide line. The line to act solely as a guide and only a single hold of the rope to stop the descent and start the ascent is permitted. Dropping dive weights is not permitted. Both bi-fins and monofin are permitted and the technique is irrelevant.
Constant weight bi-fins (CWT BF, CWTB)	depth	✓	–	✓	–	As for CWT above but monofins are not permitted and the athlete is prohibited to use a dolphin kick for his / her propulsion.
Constant weight without fins (CNF)	depth	✓	–	✓	–	As for CWT above but no swimming aids such as fins are permitted. This discipline is the most recently recognised discipline having been recognised by AIDA since 2003.
Dynamic apnea without fins (DNF)	horizontal distance	–	✓	✓	✓	Maximum distance underwater, in a pool, no swimming aids such as fins are permitted (AIDA).
Dynamic apnea with fins (DYN)	horizontal distance	–	✓	✓	✓	Maximum horizontal distance on one breath in a pool. Monofin or bi-fins are permitted and the technique is irrelevant.
Dynamic apnea with bifins (DYN BF, DYNB)	horizontal distance	–	✓	–	✓	Same as DYN above but monofins are not permitted and the athlete is prohibited to use a dolphin kick for his / her propulsion.
Free immersion apnea (FIM)	depth	✓	–	✓	–	Maximum depth following a vertical line. The line may be used to pull down to depth and back to the surface. No ballast or fins are permitted. It is known for its ease compared with the Constant Weight disciplines, while still not permitting the release of weights.
Jump blue (JB, also the cube)	horizontal distance	✗		✓	–	Maximum distance covered around a 15-metre square at a depth of 10 metres. Monofin, bi-fins or no fins are all permitted. Sled may be used for descent.
No-limits apnea (NLT)	depth	✓	–	✗		Any means of breath-hold diving to depth and return to the surface is permitted provided that a guideline is used to measure the distance. Most divers use a weighted sled to descend and an inflatable bag to ascend. New attempts are not recognised due to the level of danger presented to divers
Skandalopetra	depth & min. time	✗		✓	–	The only true team event in freediving. Diver 1 descends, usually assisted by a stone or marble slab attached to a rope, while Diver 2 waits on the surface. Diver 1 reaches the target depth and is hauled to the surface by Diver 2 using only muscle power. No diving mask, suit or fins are permitted, only nose clip.
Static apnea (STA)	max. time	✓	✓	✓	✓	Timed breathhold endurance while floating on the surface or standing on the bottom. Usually in a pool.
Static apnea with pure oxygen (STA O_{2})	max. time	✗		✗		Timed breathhold endurance, pre-breathing 100% oxygen for up to 30 minutes prior to the breathhold is permitted. Usually in a pool. Although no longer recognised by either AIDA or CMAS there were three instances of records being approved by AIDA.
Speed-endurance apnea (S&E apnea)	min. time	✗		–	✓	Shortest time over a fixed, underwater distance. An endurance sub-discipline is swum in fractions of a pool length alternating apnoea swimming with passive recovery at the intervals. Disciplines are SPE – 100m speed apnoea, END 16x50 – 800m and END 8x50 – 400m endurance apnoea.
Variable weight apnea without fins (VNF)	depth	✗		✓	–	Descent is assisted by a weighted sled sliding down a line, the ascent may be by pulling up along the line or swimming without fins.
Variable weight apnea (VWT)	depth	✓	–	✓	–	Descent is assisted by a weighted sled sliding down a line, the ascent may be either by: 1.) pulling up along the line or swimming with or without fins under AIDA rules 2.) swimming with fins under CMAS rules.

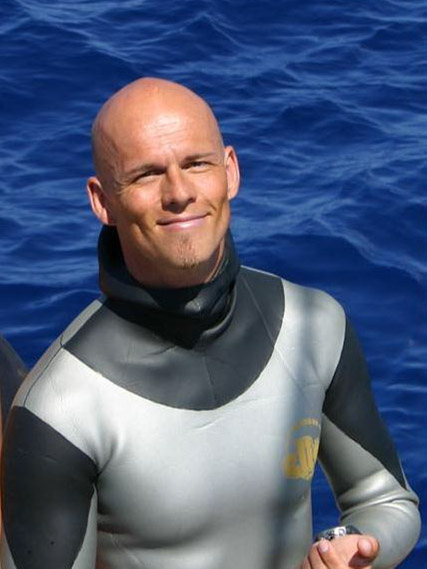
Herbert Nitsch, World Record Holder Freediver

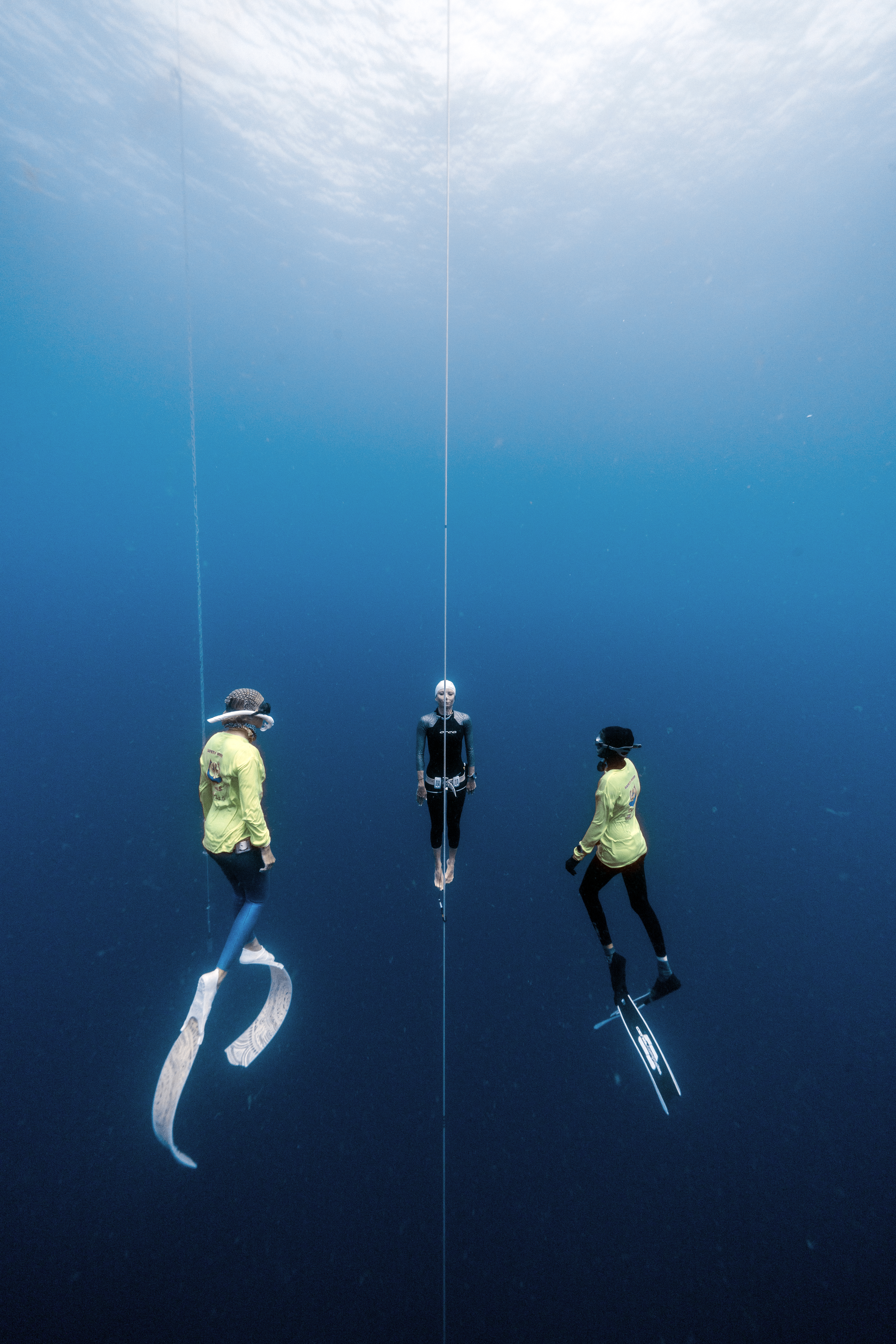
Deep-Sea World Cup Camotes Islands, Philippines; Constant Weight No-fins (CNF); Agata Załęcka 2025

Overview of the above disciplines

Discipline	Aids permitted		Weight change permitted?
Discipline	Descent	Ascent	Weight change permitted?
CNF	None or weight	None	No
CWT	BF / MF and/or weight	BF / MF	No
CWT BF	BF and/or weight	BF	No
DNF	–	–	–
DYN	–	–	–
DYN BF	–	–	–
FIM	Rope or none	Rope or none	No
JB	Sled and/or BF / MF or none	BF / MF or none	Sled only
NLT (No Limit) (Only AIDA)	Any	Any	Yes
Skandalopetra	Stone	Hauled up	Yes
STA	–	–	–
STA O_{2}	–	–	–
S&E Apnoea	–	–	–
VNF (only CMAS)	Sled	Rope or none	Yes
VWT	Sled	BF / MF or rope	Yes

=== World records ===
==== CMAS recognized world records ====
As of 1 January 2024, the CMAS recognized world records are:

Discipline		Gender	Depth [m]	Distance [m]	Time	Name/Country	Date	Place
Static apnea	STA	Men	–	–	10:45.000	Branko Petrović (SRB)	2017-11-11	Subotica, Serbia
Static apnea	STA	Women	–	–	08:53.150	Veronika Dittes (AUT)	2017-06-15	Cagliari, Italy
Dynamic apnea with fin	DYN	Men	–	321.43	–	Mateusz Malina (POL)	2022-06-15	Belgrade, Serbia
Dynamic apnea with fin	DYN	Women	–	275.36	–	Mirela Kardašević (CRO)	2022-06-15	Belgrade, Serbia
Dynamic apnea with fin	under ice	Men	–	175	–	Arthur Guérin-Boëri (FRA)	2017-03-11	Lake Sonnanen, Finland
Dynamic apnea with fin	under ice	Women	–	140	–	Valentina Cafolla (CRO)	2024-02-23	Lake Anterselva, Italy
Dynamic apnea with fin	open water	Men	–	200	–	Sertan Aydin (TUR)		
Dynamic apnea with fin	open water	Women	–		–			
Dynamic apnea with bifins	DBF	Men	–	274.70	–	Guillaume Bourdila (FRA)	2022-06-13	Belgrade, Serbia
Dynamic apnea with bifins	DBF	Women	–	250.00	–	Mirela Kardašević (CRO)	2022-06-13	Belgrade, Serbia
Dynamic apnea without fins	DNF-50	Men	–	236	–	Guillaume Bourdila (FRA)	2019-06-19	Istanbul, Turkey
Dynamic apnea without fins	DNF-50	Women	–	210	–	Julia Kozerska (POL)	2022-06-12	Belgrade, Serbia
Dynamic apnea without fins	DNF-25	Men	–	220.70	–	Vanja Peles (CRO)	2021-03-28	Sisak, Croatia
Dynamic apnea without fins	DNF-25	Women	–	206.20	–	Mirela Kardasevic (CRO)	2021-03-28	Sisak, Croatia
Speed 100 m.	SPE	Men	–	–	00:30.350	Malte Striegler (GER)	2018-06-15	Lignano, Italy
Speed 100 m.	SPE	Women	–	–	00:35.860	Vera Yarovitskaya (RUS)	2017-06-15	Cagliari, Italy
Endurance	END16x50	Men	–	–	09:10.030	Max Poschart (GER)	2019-06-19	Istanbul, Turkey
Endurance	END16x50	Women	–	–	10:41.120	Evgeniia Kozyreva (RUS)	2021-06-23	Belgrade, Serbia
Endurance	END8x50	Men	–	–	03:05.720	Mikhail Drozdov (RUS)	2019-06-22	Istanbul, Turkey
Endurance	END8x50	Women	–	–	04:10.190	Chiara Zaffaroni (ITA)	2023-05-10	Kuwait
Endurance	END4x50	Men	–	–				
Endurance	END4x50	Women	–	–	01:33.860	Chiara Zaffaroni (ITA)	2023-05-11	Kuwait
Jump blue apnea with fins	at sea	Men	–	201.61	–	Arthur Guérin-Boëri (FRA)	2015-10-09	Ischia, Italy
Jump blue apnea with fins	at sea	Women	–	190.48	–	Alessia Zecchini (ITA)	2015-10-09	Ischia, Italy
Jump blue apnea with fins	fresh water	Men	–	170	–	Alfredo Leonidas Rosado Estrada (ECU)		
Jump blue apnea with fins	fresh water	Women	–	132.92	–	Gilda Rivadeneria Montalvo (ECU)		
Constant weight with fins	at sea	Men	136	–	–	Alexey Molchanov (RUS)	2023-08-23	Roatan, Honduras
Constant weight with fins	at sea	Women	122	–	–	Alenka Artnik (SLO)	2021-07-21	Long Island, Bahamas
Constant weight with fins	fresh water	Men	80	–	–	Michele Tomasi (ITA)		
Constant weight with fins	fresh water	Women	57	–	–	Tanya Streeter (UK)	1998-12-28	Ocala, Fl, USA
Constant weight with bifins (CWT BF)	at sea	Men	124	–	–	Alexey Molchanov (RUS)	2023-08-25	Roatan, Honduras
Constant weight with bifins (CWT BF)	at sea	Women	106	–	–	Alenka Artnik (SLO)	2021-09-30	Kaş, Turkey
Constant weight with bifins (CWT BF)	fresh water	Men	75	–	–	Michele Tomasi (ITA)		
Constant weight with bifins (CWT BF)	fresh water	Women		–	–			
Constant weight without fins	at sea	Men	100	–	–	Alexey Molchanov (RUS)	2023-08-23	Roatan, Honduras
Constant weight without fins	at sea	Women	78	–	–	Kateryna Sadurska (UKR)	2023-08-24	Roatan, Honduras
Constant weight without fins	fresh water	Men	65	–	–	Michal Rišian (CZE)	2016-07-10	Weyregg, Austria
Constant weight without fins	fresh water	Women	–	–	–	–	–	–
Free immersion apnea	at sea	Men	132	–	–	Petar Klovar (CRO)	2022-10-04	Kaş, Turkey
Free immersion apnea	at sea	Women	72	–	–	Alessia Zecchini (ITA)	2021-07-17	Long Island, Bahamas
Variable weight apnea monofin	at sea	Men	131	–	–	Homer Leuci (ITA)	2012-09-11	Soverato, Italy
Variable weight apnea monofin	at sea	Women	116	–	–	Lena Balta (SER)	2022-06-25	Sharm el Sheik, Egypt
Variable weight apnea bifins	at sea	Men	130	–	–	William Winram (SWI)	2021-10-21	Sharm el Sheik, Egypt
Variable weight apnea bifins	at sea	Women	-	–	–			
Variable weight apnea without fins (VNF)	at sea	Men	140	–	–	William Winram (SWI)	2023-12-11	Sharm el Sheik, Egypt
Variable weight apnea without fins (VNF)	at sea	Women	106	–	–	Şahika Ercümen (TUR)	2023-10-17	Hatay, Turkey
Skandalopetra	at sea	Men	112	–	–	Andreas Güldner (GER)	2014-06-26	Red Sea, Egypt
Skandalopetra	at sea	Women	68.9	–	–	Karol Meyer (BRA)	2012	Bonaire, Caribbean

==== AIDA recognized world records ====
As of 26 July 2023, the AIDA recognized world records are:

Discipline	Gender	Depth [m]	Distance [m]	Time	Name	Date	Place
Static apnea (STA)	Men	–	–	11 min 35 sec	Stéphane Mifsud (FRA)	2009-06-08	Hyères, Var, France
Static apnea (STA)	Women	–	–	9 min 22 sec	Heike Schwerdtner (GER)	2025-05-04	Stockholm, Sweden
Dynamic apnea with fins (DYN)	Men	–	316.53	–	Mateusz Malina (POL)	2019-06-22	Turku, Finland
Dynamic apnea with fins (DYN)	Women	–	280	–	Zsófia Törőcsik (HUN)	2025-07-02	Wakayama, Japan
Dynamic apnea with bifins (DYNB)	Men	–	298	–	Guillaume Bourdila (FRA)	2025-06-28	Wakayama, Japan
Dynamic apnea with bifins (DYNB)	Women	–	208	–	Kardasevic Mirela (CRO)	2019-03-07	Moscow, Russia
Dynamic apnea without fins (DNF)	Men	–	250	–	Mateusz Malina (POL)	2022-05-01	Dębica, Poland
Dynamic apnea without fins (DNF)	Women	–	213	–	Julia Kozerska (POL)	2023-06-13	Seogwipo, South Korea
Constant weight apnea (CWT)	Men	133	–	–	Alexey Molchanov (RUS)	2023-07-22	Dean's Blue Hole, Long Island Bahamas
Constant weight apnea (CWT)	Women	123	–	–	Alessia Zecchini (ITA)	2023-04-24	Camotes Island, Philippines
Constant weight apnea with bifins (CWTB)	Men	126	–	–	Alexey Molchanov (RUS)	2025-09-26	Limassol, Cyprus
Constant weight apnea with bifins (CWTB)	Women	111	–	–	Alenka Artnik (SVN)	2023-07-30	Dean's Blue Hole, Long Island Bahamas
Constant weight apnea without fins (CNF)	Men	103	–	–	Petar Klovar (CRO)	2025-05-26	Sharm el-Sheikh, Egypt
Constant weight apnea without fins (CNF)	Women	73	–	–	Alessia Zecchini (ITA)	2016-04-26	Dean's Blue Hole, Long Island Bahamas
Free immersion apnea (FIM)	Men	133	–	–	Alexey Molchanov (RUS)	2023-07-21	Dean's Blue Hole, Long Island Bahamas
Free immersion apnea (FIM)	Women	103	–	–	Sanda Delija (HRV)	2025-05-04	Mabini, Philippines
Variable weight apnea (VWT)	Men	156	–	–	Alexey Molchanov (RUS)	2023-03-28	Bonaire, Caribbean
Variable weight apnea (VWT)	Women	130	–	–	Nanja van den Broek (NED)	2015-10-18	Sharm el-Sheikh, Egypt
No Limit apnea (NLT)	Men	214	–	–	Herbert Nitsch (AUT)	2012-06-06	Santorini, Greece
No Limit apnea (NLT)	Women	160	–	–	Tanya Streeter (UK)	2002-08-17	Turks and Caicos

Discipline	Gender	Points	Team / Individual	Date	Place
AIDA team	Men	840.6	CRO; Goran Čolak, Božidar Petani, Veljano Zanki	2012-09-16	Nice, France
AIDA team	Women				
AIDA team	Men	313.3	William Trubridge (NZL)	2010-07-06	Okinawa, Japan
AIDA team	Women				

==== Guinness recognized world records ====
The following table only includes those disciplines that are modifications of existing AIDA or CMAS disciplines and Guinness-exclusive (as it recognizes and inherits some AIDA/CMAS records) or Guinness-conceived (CMAS and AIDA do/did sanction at some time) disciplines.

As of 25 February 2018:

Discipline	Gender	Depth [m]	Distance [m]	Time	Name	Date	Place
STA O2	Men	–	–	24:11	Budimir Šobat (CRO)	24 February 2018	Zagreb
STA O2	Women	–	–	18:32	Karol Meyer (BRA)	10 July 2009	Florianopolis
DYN under ice	Men	–	175	–	details under CMAS world records		
DYN under ice	Women	–	125	–	details under CMAS world records		
DNF under ice	Men	–	84	–	Nik Linder (GER)	Feb 2013	Weissensee
DNF under ice	Women	–		–			
DNF under ice (no diving suit)	Men	–	81	–	David Vencl (CZ)	Feb 2021	Lahošť lake
DNF under ice (no diving suit)	Women	–	50	–	Johanna Nordblad (FIN)	Mar 2015	Päijänne
NLT under ice	Men	65	–	–	Andreas Pap (SRB)	Feb 2013	Weissensee
NLT under ice	Women		–	–			

== Recreational ==
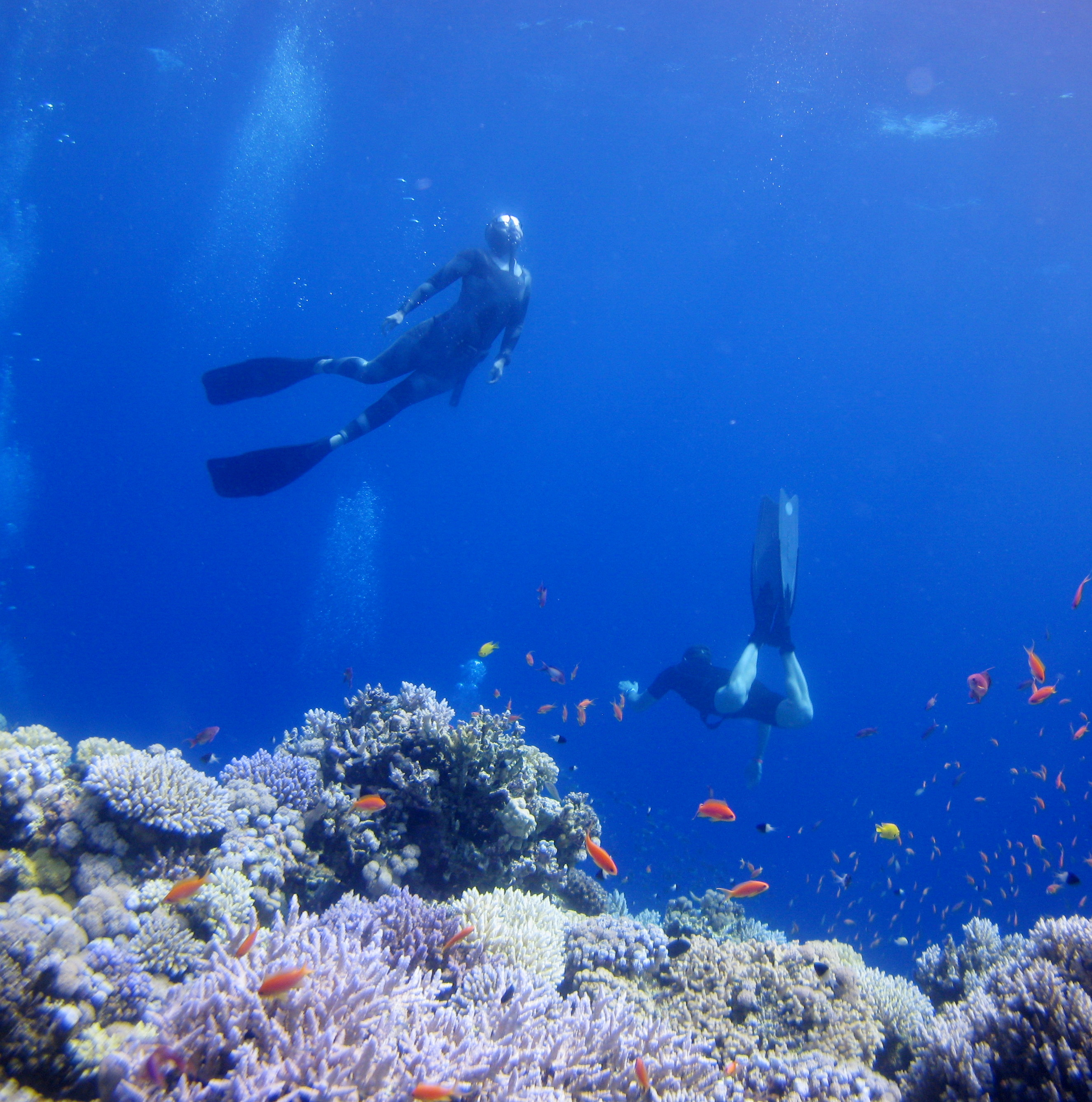
Recreational freediving at the Blue Hole in the Red Sea

Freediving as a recreational activity is widely practiced and differs significantly from scuba diving. Although there are risks to all freediving activities, it can be acceptably safely practiced at a wide range of skill levels from the average snorkeler to the professional freediver. Compared to scuba diving, freediving offers:

- Freedom from cumbersome equipment and short preparation times.
- Low cost.
- It is quiet and does not disturb fish, the noise of breathing and bubbles can be quite loud on open circuit scuba though rebreathers are much quieter.
- Mobility and speed, but for a much more limited period.
- No decompression stops required for deep dives, although it is possible to get decompression sickness, or taravana, from repetitive deep free-diving with short surface intervals. This is balanced against much shorter dive times.
- The lack of exhaled air bubbles gives better visibility during ascent.
- Accessibility, if the site can be walked to it can, potentially, be dived.
- Appropriately skilled and fit freedivers can go as deep, or deeper than, recreational scuba divers, the depth being limited only by the willingness to accept the risks; scuba diving is restricted by the level of certification.

Freshwater springs and other caves, often with excellent visibility, have been freedived but with greater risks. Diving into water with restricted access to the surface is very different from diving in open water. The time available to a freediver to solve problems underwater before hypoxia sets in is severely restricted in comparison with scuba, and scuba diving under an overhead is not recommended without an independent emergency gas supply.

== Physiology ==
Human physiology of freediving is the physiological influences of the underwater environment on the human breath hold ambient pressure diver, and adaptations to operating underwater. It, therefore, includes the range of physiological effects generally limited to human freediving. Several factors influence the diver, including immersion, exposure to the water, the limitations of breath-hold endurance, variations in ambient pressure, and sensory impairment. All of these may affect diver performance and safety.

Immersion affects fluid balance, circulation and work of breathing. Exposure to cold water can result in the harmful cold shock response, the helpful diving reflex and excessive loss of body heat. Breath-hold duration is limited by oxygen reserves, the response to raised carbon dioxide levels, and the risk of hypoxic blackout, which has a high associated risk of drowning.

Large or sudden changes in ambient pressure have the potential for injury known as barotrauma. Metabolically inactive gases are absorbed by the tissues and may have narcotic or other undesirable effects, and must be released slowly to avoid the formation of bubbles during decompression.

The underwater environment also affects sensory input, which can impact on safety and the ability to function effectively at depth.

=== Recent human adaptation ===
In addition to general adaptations within the human species, freediving is an example of an activity that has been directly affected by recent human evolution. The Bajau, or "Sea Nomads," have engaged in freediving for thousands of years, and natural selection has led to larger spleen sizes. This serves as an oxygen reservoir when diving. It is hypothesized that other isolated diving populations globally may have experienced the same selection.

== Techniques ==
Breath-holding ability, and hence dive performance, is a function of on-board oxygen stores, scope for metabolic rate reduction, efficient oxygen utilization, and hypoxia tolerance. Athletes attempt to accomplish this in various ways. Some divers use "packing", which increases lung volume beyond normal total lung capacity. In addition, training is allocated to enhance blood and muscle oxygen stores, to a limited extent. Most divers rely on increasing fitness by increasing CO_{2} tolerance and lung capacity. Simple breath-holding practice is highly effective for the build-up of tolerance to CO_{2} and to some degree increased lung capacity. In an interview on the radio talk show Fresh Air, journalist James Nestor, author of the book Breath: The New Science of a Lost Art, stated: "Some divers have a lung capacity of 14 liters, which is about double the size for a typical adult male. They weren't born this way. ... They trained themselves to breathe in ways to profoundly affect their physical bodies."

Before competition attempts, freedivers perform a preparation sequence, which usually consists of physical stretching, mental exercise and breath exercise. It may include a succession of variable length static apnea and special purging deep breaths. Results of the preparation sequence are slower metabolism, lower heart and breathing rates, lower levels of carbon dioxide in the bloodstream, and overall mental equilibrium.

=== Lung packing ===
Technically known as glossopharyngeal insufflation, lung packing or buccal pumping is a technique for inflating the lungs beyond their normal isobaric total capacity, which is used to delay the compression of the lungs at by hydrostatic pressure, allowing a greater depth to be reached, and provide a slightly larger reserve of oxygen for the dive. After full normal inspiration, the diver fills the mouth with air, with the glottis closed, then opens the glottis and forces the air from the mouth into the lung, then closes the glottis to hold in the air. This is repeated several times. Lung packing can increase the volume of air in the lungs by up to 50% of vital capacity. The pressure induced will reduce the volume of blood in the chest, which will increase the space available for air. The gas in the lungs is also compressed. Pressures of about 75 millimetres of mercury (100 mbar) have been reported. Lung packing has been associated with short-term haemodynamic instabilities, which might contribute toward triggering blackout.

=== Recovery breathing ===
Also known as hook breathing. This is a technique used by free divers on surfacing to reduce the risk of surface blackout. A partial exhalation is made, followed by a quick inhalation; then the diver closes the airway and pressurises for a few seconds as if about to cough. This behavior is repeated a few times over the first 30 seconds or so on the surface. The aim is to keep thoracic pressure slightly raised to artificially raise arterial oxygen partial pressure or prevent it from dropping in the critical seconds until newly oxygenated blood can reach the brain and thereby prevent surface blackout. This is the same technique used by pilots during high-g maneuvers, as well as by mountaineers at high altitude.

== Training ==
There is no requirement by law that free-divers are required to do formal freediving training or be certified, but due to the risks inherent to the sport, freediving without knowledge or training can pose a greater risk to life. The free-diving courses contain three components: theory studies, confined water sessions generally conducted in a swimming pool, and open water sessions in the ocean or other large body of fresh or salt water.

Training for breathhold endurance can take many forms, some of which can be performed on land. One training exercise is the apnea walk. This consists of a preparation "breathe-up", followed by a short (typically 1 minute) breath hold taken at rest. Without breaking the hold, participants then begin walking as far as possible until it becomes necessary to breathe again. Some athletes can do close to 400 meters in training this way.

This form of training is good for accustoming muscles to work under anaerobic conditions, and for tolerance to carbon dioxide build-up in the circulation. It is also easy to gauge progress, as increasing distance can be measured.

=== Certification ===
There are several training agencies that provide certification in freediving at various levels from beginner to instructor. Some, like AIDA and Molchanovs, are focused exclusively on freediving, particularly competitive aspects, while others, like PADI and SSI, are primarily international recreational scuba training agencies that have branched out into recreational freediving. All of these agencies will provide instruction and practical training in aspects of safety, basic freediving physiology theory and practical techniques.

== Safety ==
Freedivers are encouraged by certification and sporting organisations to dive only with a 'buddy' who accompanies them, observing from in the water at the surface, and ready to dive to the rescue if the diver loses consciousness during the ascent. This is only reasonably practicable if the water clarity allows observation, and the buddy is capable of safely reaching the diver. In poor visibility the diver can clip onto the downline with a buddy line. Signals can be transmitted on the downline and it can be used to find the diver. Spearfishers can use a surface marker buoy for the same purpose. Due to the nature of the sport, the risks of freediving can be reduced by strict adherence to safety measures as an integral part of the activity, but cannot be eliminated. Competition rules may require all participants to be certified and adept in rescue and resuscitation.

=== Hazards, consequences and risk ===
The most obvious hazard is lack of access to air for breathing – a necessity for human life. This can result in asphyxia from drowning if the diver does not reach the surface while still capable of holding their breath and resuming breathing. The risk depends on several factors, including the depth, duration and shape of the dive profile.

Latent hypoxia is a specific hazard of deeper freedives. This effect can cause hypoxic blackout during surfacing.

Freediving blackout, breath-hold blackout, or apnea blackout is a class of hypoxic blackout, a loss of consciousness caused by cerebral hypoxia towards the end of a breath-hold (freedive or dynamic apnea) dive, when the swimmer does not necessarily experience an urgent need to breathe and has no other obvious medical condition that might have caused it.

Blackouts can be provoked by hyperventilating just before a dive, or as a consequence of the pressure reduction on ascent, or a combination of these. This is because the urge to breathe is primarily driven by rising carbon dioxide (CO_{2}) levels rather than falling oxygen levels. Hyperventilation just before a dive significantly reduces carbon dioxide levels in the blood which delays the body's warning signals to breathe and can mislead the brain into feeling comfortable despite oxygen levels dropping to dangerous levels. For this reason, freedivers are strongly advised not to hyperventilate before a dive.

Blackouts are more likely to occur when divers ascend to the surface compared with descending or while at depth. This is because pressure lowers when a diver ascend, which causes partial pressure in their lungs to drop. This can rapidly reduce oxygen levels available to the body and if oxygen levels drops below what the brain requires to be conscious, blackouts can occur within seconds. Safety guidelines advises divers to keep within their limits, be aware of their body signals, and to ascend slowly.

Freedivers can develop reduced carbon dioxide (CO_{2}) sensitivity as an adaptation to repeated breath-holding exercises. This allows them to better tolerate higher CO_{2} concentrations and delay the urge to breathe, which improves their breath-hold performance. However as reduced CO_{2} sensitivity also delays respiratory warning signals, it means conditioned divers must rely on disciplined limits and safety practices to avoid hypoxic blackouts. Empirically, victims are often established practitioners of breath-hold diving, are fit, strong swimmers and have completed many dives before without previous problems.

Divers and swimmers who black out or grey out underwater will usually drown unless rescued and resuscitated within a short time. This blackout has a high fatality rate, and figures from Australia indicate that it mostly involves males younger than 40 years, but is generally avoidable. Risk cannot be quantified, but is clearly increased by any level of hyperventilation.

Freediving blackout can occur on any dive profile: at constant depth, on an ascent from depth, or at the surface following ascent from depth and may be described by a number of terms depending on the dive profile and depth at which consciousness is lost. Blackout during a shallow dive differs from blackout during ascent from a deep dive in that blackout during ascent is precipitated by depressurisation on ascent from depth while blackout in consistently shallow water is a consequence of hypocapnia following hyperventilation.

There is also a wide range of environmental hazards possible specific to the site and water and weather conditions at the time of diving, and there may be other hazards specific to the freediving activity, such as spearfishing.

Failing to respond to physiological warning signals, or crossing the mental barrier by strong will, may lead to blackout underwater or on reaching the surface. Trained freedivers are well aware of this and competitions must be held under strict supervision and with competent first-aiders on standby. However, this does not eliminate the risk of blackout.

=== Competition safety ===
Following the deaths of two freedivers in competitions, AIDA has a system set up for monitoring and if necessary, recovering competitors who lose consciousness underwater. As of 2022 the incidence of adverse events in depth competitions varies between 3 and 4% of competition dives. This rate is considered relatively low and is expected during competitions where divers push their breath-hold limits. Almost all of these divers are successfully assisted and recover completely. There is a much lower incidence of more serious injuries.

==== Safety divers ====
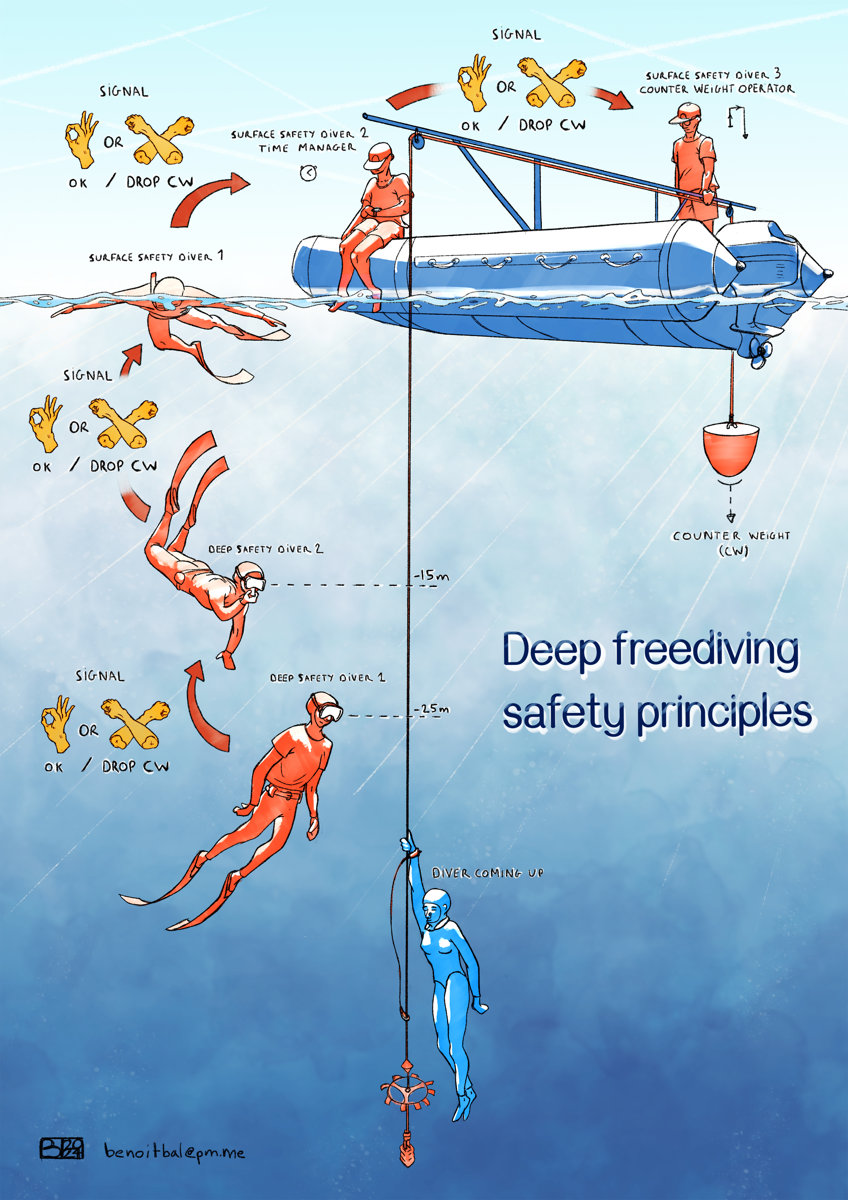
Deep safety principles for freediving with counter weight

The safety team is usually made up of volunteers, or paid staff in some major events, and is supervised by the Chief of Safety. Each competitor is monitored by a team of breath-hold safety divers who will descend in time to meet the competitor during their ascent, and monitor them for the rest of the ascent. They will intervene if necessary, typically by securing the competitor's airway and swimming them up to the surface. The first safety diver will meet the competitor at somewhere around 1/3 to 1/4 of the target depth, usually with a maximum of 30m. The second will meet them about 10m shallower, and a third will be on standby in case of an emergency. The work can be challenging as many dives are done in a day, so the team of safety divers is usually rotated to ensure that they are not overtasked. Scuba divers and scooter freedivers may also be part of the safety team.

In case of a deeper incident, the competitor is clipped to the downline for the duration of the dive, which can be rapidly raised by the surface support team, which includes a medical support group.

=== Statistics and notable accidents ===
Nicholas Mevoli, a diver from New York died on 17 November 2013 after losing consciousness on surfacing from a 3-minute 38 second dive to a depth of 72 metres (236 ft) during an official record attempt in the "constant weight without fins" event. He had previously reached greater depths and longer times in other disciplines.

On 22 July 2017, Irish safety diver Stephen Keenan died during a dive in Dahab, Egypt. He was the safety diver for Italian freediver Alessia Zecchini, who was attempting to swim through the Arch of the Blue Hole. For reasons that remain unclear, Keenan began his descent approximately 20 seconds later than planned, causing him to miss the scheduled meeting point with Zecchini. He eventually reached her and assisted her ascent to the surface. Shortly afterward, Keenan lost consciousness and was later found floating face down in the water.

== Fiction and documentaries ==
=== Documentaries ===
- Ocean Men (2001) is a documentary film about the art and science of freediving, featuring two of its most outstanding exponents: Francisco "Pipín" Ferreras and Umberto Pelizzari.
- My Pilot, Whale (2014) is a short documentary film directed by Alexander and Nicole Gratovsky, demonstrating direct communication between a human and free pilot whales in the open ocean. The entire underwater part was shot without underwater breathing equipment; both the operator and the person appearing in the frame are freediving.
- My Octopus Teacher (2020) is a nature documentary. Filmmaker Craig Foster captured most of the footage used in the film while freediving.
- The Deepest Breath (2023) is a feature-length documentary written and directed by Laura McGann about Italian freediver Alessia Zecchini and Irish safety diver Stephen Keenan.

=== Fiction ===
- In the film Mission: Impossible – Rogue Nation, Tom Cruise plays super spy Ethan Hunt fighting the forces of evil, and goes freediving in a scene to expose the villains.
- The Pearl by John Steinbeck (1947) is a novel about a poor pearl diver, Kino, who finds the 'Pearl of Heaven', which is exceptionally valuable, changing his life forever. The novel explores themes of man's nature as well as greed and evil.
- In South Sea Adventure (1952) by Willard Price the Hunt brothers, marooned on a coral island, use free diving to collect both pearls and fresh water.
- In Ian Fleming's (1964) James Bond novel You Only Live Twice, the character Kissy Suzuki is an ama diver. This connection was also mentioned in the film version.
- Man from Atlantis was a 1970s TV series which featured a superhero with the ability to breathe underwater and freedive in his own special way.
- The Big Blue (1988) is a romantic film about two world-class freedivers, a heavily fictionalized depiction of the rivalry of freedivers Jacques Mayol and Enzo Maiorca.
- In the movie Phoenix Blue (2001), protagonist Rick is a musician who freedives competitively.
- The children's novel The Dolphins of Laurentum by Caroline Lawrence (2003), which takes place in ancient Rome, describes the applications of freediving (sponge and pearl diving) and its hazards, as one of the principal characters, as well as the main antagonist, try to beat each other to a sunken treasure.
- The Freediver (2004) is a film about a talented female freediver who is discovered and brought to an island, where she is trained by an ambitious scientist to break a freediving world record currently held by an American woman.
- In the film Into the Blue (2005) starring Jessica Alba, a group of divers find themselves in deep trouble with a drug lord after they come upon the illicit cargo of a sunken airplane in the Caribbean. Jessica Alba is an accomplished freediver, and did much of the underwater work; some other stunts were performed by Mehgan Heaney-Grier.
- In Greg Iles' novel Blood Memory (2005), the main character Cat Ferry is an odontologist and a freediver.
- H_{2}O: Just Add Water Series 3 added a freediver (Will Benjamin played by Luke Mitchell) as a regular. Freediving is featured in some episodes.
- The Greater Meaning of Water (2010) is an independent film about competitive constant weight freediving, focusing on the 'zen' of freediving.
- In the Canadian television series Corner Gas, the character Karen Pelly (Tara Spencer-Nairn) competed in static apnea, ranking fifth in Canada with a personal best of over six minutes.
- In the American television series Baywatch episode "The Chamber" (Session 2, Episode 17), the character Mitch Buchannon rescues a diver trapped 90 feet below the ocean surface, but almost dies while suffering the effects of decompression sickness; decompression sickness is extremely implausible following freediving exposure to this depth.
- In the book Hornblower and the Atropos, CS Forester's character Horatio Hornblower is tasked by the Royal Navy to retrieve sunken treasure with the help of freediving Sinhalese pearl divers
- In the film One Breath (2020), based on the biography of the “queen of freediving,” world champion Natalia Molchanova.
- In the film Sous emprise (2022), based on two freedivers, Roxana Aubry and Pascal Gauthier, as well as their love story.
- In the film Avatar: The Way of Water (2022), the Metkayina Clan of the Na'vi have adapted to freediving and have built their entire culture around it, which they teach to the Sully family.
- In the film Black Panther: Wakanda Forever (2022), a Mayan priest freedives and discovers a mutated plant that is used to mutate his tribe into merpeople.

== See also ==
- British Freediving Association – British affiliate to AIDA International
- Nordic Deep – Freediving competition in Lysekil, Sweden
- Vertical Blue – Freediving competition in the Bahamas at Dean's Blue Hole
- Skandalopetra diving – Freediving using a stone weight at the end of a rope to the surface
- Audrey Mestre – French world record-setting freediver
- Snorkeling – Swimming while inhaling through a snorkel
- Ear clearing - the process of equalising the middle ear cavity to the ambient pressure required during underwater descent.
