= 2026 in Croatia =

- Decades: 2000s; 2010s; 2020s
- See also: Other events of 2026; Timeline of Croatian history

Events in the year 2026 in Croatia.

== Incumbents ==
- President: Zoran Milanović
- Speaker of the Parliament: Gordan Jandroković
- Prime Minister: Andrej Plenković

== Events ==
=== January ===
- 2 January – Two people die in a house fire in Glina.
- 6 – 12 January – Heavy snowfall affects Croatia, disrupting travel and causing numerous injuries. In Zagreb, hundreds of people are treated for fracture related injuries caused by icy conditions and an orange level weather warning is issued for the Zagreb region. A red weather warning is issued for the Osijek region. In Knin, several villages are left without electricity and the start of classes in primary schools is postponed.
- 7 January – Blessed Miroslav Bulešić Hospice is opened in Pula.
- 9 January – The maternity hospital in Sinj is closed due to a low number of births.
- 12 January – A woman dies of carbon monoxide poisoning in Zaprešić.
- 29 January – Tomislav Ćorić is voted in as the new Minister of Finance by a vote of 76-52 in the Croatian Parliament. His predecessor, Marko Primorac becomes the vice president of the European Investment Bank.
- 31 January – Marko Kovač and Vlado Razum are consecrated as auxiliary bishops of Zagreb in the Zagreb Cathedral by archbishop Dražen Kutleša.

=== February ===
- 1 February – The Croatian men's handball team wins a bronze medal at the European Championship in Scandinavia.
- 3 February – Up to 50,000 people gather at the Ban Jelačić Square in Zagreb to celebrate the Croatian men's handball team's silver medal.
- 6-15 February – Croatia participates at the Milano-Cortina Winter Olympics with 14 competitors in four sports.
- 7 February – The Croatia national futsal team wins bronze at the European championship.
- 18 February – The final identification of nine victims from the Croatian War of Independence, four of whom are Croatian defenders, is carried out at the Faculty of Medicine in Zagreb.
- 21 February – Demonstrations in Zagreb against a planned chicken farms complex near Sisak.
- 23 February – A boat carrying migrants capsizes along the Una River near Hrvatska Kostajnica, killing a passenger.
- 27 February
  - The student dormitory of the Polytechnic in Bjelovar opens.
  - A worker dies at a construction site in the Zagreb neighborhood of Sveta Klara.
  - Croatian soldiers Stjepan Boni and Zvonimir Miljak are buried in Antunovac and at the Vukovar Memorial Cemetery, 36 years after their disappearance during the Croatian War of Independence and nine days after their exhumation.
- 28 February – A 17-year-old boy dies after being hit by a train in a tunnel at the main railway station in Split.

=== March ===
- 1 March – The Croatian Police's anti-explosive service removes a World War II anti-ship mine weighing 500 kg (1,100 lb), with more than 300 kg (660 lb) of explosives, from Rovinj's Lone Bay.
- 2 March
  - Employees of the Institute for Social Work in Split and Kaštela start a "white strike" (bijeli štrajk) due to a "lack of professional staff and administrative burden".
  - A German EMC anti-ship mine from World War II weighing 500 kg (1,100 lb) is found at a construction site in Pazin.
  - Fourteen people are injured in a fire at Bilice prison in Split.
  - Shooters Josip Sikavica, Miran Maričić and Petar Gorša win bronze in the team competition of the European Championship in Yerevan.
- 3 March
  - An earthquake measuring 3.1 on the Richter scale hits the Sisak area at 5:46 a.m. (CET).
  - The 17th Croatian Contingent (HRVCON) with 50 soldiers deploys to NATO's Forward Land Forces in Poland from the barracks in Knin.
  - Mayor of Nova Gradiška Vinko Grgić resigns.
  - Fourteen Croatian pilgrims return from the Holy Land by charter flight at Zagreb Airport amid the Israel-US attack on Iran.
  - USKOK arrests 19 suspects for corruption, two of whom are high-ranking officials of the HEP power company.
  - Croatian free diver Vitomir Maričić receives recognition from the World Apnea – AIDA International for the best free diver in 2025 by international ranking, while compatriot Petar Klovar finishes second.
  - Shooter Josip Sikavica becomes the European champion in the solo air rifle at the 2026 European Shooting Championships in Armenia.
- 4 March
  - An earthquake with an epicenter near Siverić (Drniš) measuring 3.9 on the Richter scale is recorded at 1:23 a.m. (CET)
  - The Ministry of Foreign Affairs deploys four Croatia Airlines' aircraft to evacuate Croatian citizens in the United Arab Emirates due to the 2026 Iran war.
- 6-15 March – Croatia participates at the Winter Paralympics in Milan-Cortina with five competitors in two sports.
- 10 March
  - Stjepan Lakušić is re-elected as rector of the University of Zagreb.
  - A worker dies at a construction site in Tučepi.
- 11 March – Fifty years of the play San i ludilo ('Dream and Madness') by Teatar &TD, adaptation of Tin Ujević's poetry.
- 12-16 March – WTT Feeder 2026, international table tennis competition in Varaždin Arena.
- 13 March – Pope Leo XIV appoints Msgr. Leopoldo Girelli as apostolic nuncio in Croatia.
- 14 March – The National Shrine of Saint Joseph is proclaimed as a basilica minor at the Holy Mass celebrated by archbishop Dražen Kutleša.
- 24 March
  - As part of archaeological research in the area of the City Market in Vinkovci, archaeologists find 22 Roman graves.
  - During her official visit to Croatia, the President of North Macedonia, Gordana Siljanovska-Davkova, meets with President Zoran Milanović and Prime Minister Andrej Plenković.
- 25 March – A worker dies in a quarry near Petrinja after being run over by a machine loading crushed stone.
- 26 March – The bodies of two unknown males are found in the Paovo forest area, near the village of Soljani.
- 30 March – The Croatia national under-19 football team qualifies for the UEFA Championship in Wales.
- 31 March – A natural disaster is declared in Jastrebarsko.

=== April ===
- 5-6 April – One person dies in a house fire in Peščenica.
- 6 April – One person dies in Hum Košnički near Desinić following an accident with a kubura.
- 7-8 April – The Directorate for Detainees and Missing People of the Ministry of Croatian Veterans exhumes the remains of 11 people killed at the end of World War II in the Split-Dalmatia County, nine of which are found in the Medviđa cave on Biokovo, near Zagvozd.
- 9 April – An informal meeting of foreign ministers of the EU MED9 member states in Split.
- 9-12 April – Gymnastic DOBRO World Cup 2026 in Gradski vrt Hall in Osijek, with gymnasts from 51 countries.
- 12 April – The Croatian women's handball team qualifies for the European Championship in December.
- 13-14 April – A wildfire breaks out in the protected ornithological reserve Orepak near Vid in the Neretva valley.
- 13-15 April – Split Open, international wheelchair tennis tournament, in Firule Tennis Centre in Split.
- 13 April – Taekwondoka Klara Uglešić wins a silver medal at the World Junior Championship.
- 17 April – Judoka Iva Oberan wins a bronze medal at the European Championship in Tbilisi.
- 21 April – One person dies in an explosion at an underpass in Split.
- 22 April – A foreign national is found dead in Staro Selo Topusko.
- 26 April–3 May – Mediterranean Bowling Championships in Zaprešić.
- 26 April – Boxer Gabrijel Veočić wins a silver medal at the World Cup in Brazil.
- 27 April – At the "Depth Quest" competition in Mabini, Philippines, Croatian freediver Petar Klovar sets two world records (FIM and CWTB), Vitomir Maričić wins first place overall, Sanda Delija sets a national record (CWTB), and Toma Čelar wins the award for the greatest improvement.
- 28-29 April – Three Seas Initiative's 11th Summit in Dubrovnik, with 1,600 state, financial and corporative representatives from 45 countries participating.
- 28 April
  - Croatia and Bosnia-Herzegovina sign an agreement to build the Southern Interconnection gas pipeline connecting Bosnia with the LNG terminal in Krk.
  - A mass grave with the remains of more than 50 victims from World War II and the post-war period is found in the Golubinka cave on Sopanj hill, in Šibenik-Knin County.
- 29 April – International Democracy Union's Forum with 250 party representatives from around 50 countries is held in Zagreb.

=== May ===
- 2-3 May – Around 12,000 young Catholics from Croatia, Bosnia and Herzegovina and the Croatian diaspora participate at the 13th Croatian Catholic Youth Meeting in Požega organized by the Diocese of Požega.
- 5 May – A magnitude 4.1 earthquake hits near Kopački rit.
- 7-10 May – Jumping World Cup in Samobor.
- 10-13 May – Coptic Pope Tawadros II makes an official visit to Croatia; holding services in Zagreb at the "Day of Coptic-Catholic friendship" and meeting with foreign minister Gordan Grlić-Radman, prime minister Andrej Plenković and speaker of parliament Gordan Jandroković, as well as with president Zoran Milanović. He also meets with Croatian Catholic prelates archbishop Dražen Kutleša, bishop Vjekoslav Huzjak and others.
- 12 May – A memorial for 15 children killed in the Siege of Dubrovnik is opened in Gruž.
- 13 May – The Directorate for War Veterans and Military Heritage of Slovenia repatriates in the Dobrava Memorial Park near Maribor the remains of around 500 Croatian victims of World War II and the post-war period, men aged 18 to 40, exhumed from 2013 to 2017 from five locations in Slovenia (Košnica pri Celju, Trebče, Podstenice/Rugarski klanc and Cerklje ob Krki).
- 15-22 May – European Sailing Championship in ILCA 6 and ILCA 7 in Kaštela.
- 20-24 May – Croatia wins eight medals at the European Karate Championships in Frankfurt.
- 23 May – The remains of 36 people (35 men and one woman) killed after World War II are buried in Možđenec, Novi Marof.

=== June ===
- 4 June – A light aircraft that originated from Austria crashes near Medulin, killing four people.
- 10 June – A natural disaster is declared in Štrigova due to a hailstorm.
- 13 June
  - A ceremonial parade in Velika Gorica, with more than 300 firefighters from 40 volunteer fire departments, held on the occasion of the 150th anniversary of the Velika Gorica Voluntary Fire Department.
  - A boy drowns in the Drava between Pušćine and Gornji Hrašćan.
- 23–28 June – ŠRC Jarun hosts:
  - 11th Men's Beach Handball World Championships
  - 11th Women's Beach Handball World Championships.
- 26 June – A drowns in Jarun lake in Zagreb.

=== July ===
- 3 July – The Croatian women's youth handball team wins the bronze medal at the Open European Championship in Sweden.
- 4 July
  - The Croatian youth water polo team wins the gold medal at the World Championship in Portugal; captain Nikola Batoš is named goalkeeper of the tournament, and coach Hrvoje Koljanin coach of the tournament.
  - The Croatian U16 national field hockey team wins the bronze medal at the EuroHockey U16 5s Championship in Turkey; Leon Hercigonja is named as the MVP of the tournament, and Patrik Horvat as the best goalkeeper of the championship.
- 5 July – Around 3,600 karatekas from 75 countries participate at the World Karate Federation's youth camp in Poreč.
- 6 July – The 66th Musical Evenings at St Donatus opens at the Roman forum in Zadar with concert of Symphonic orchestra and choir of the Croatian Radiotelevision.
- 21 July
  - The anti-explosives unit of the Croatian Police destroys a 150 kg (330 lb) World War II aircraft bomb in Batina through a controlled explosion.
  - The bodies of three drowned Egyptian nationals are found in the Sava river near Okunšćak.
- 22 July – The Ministry of Health and the Bosnian-Herzegovinian Federal Ministry of Health sign an "Agreement on cooperation in emergency medicine".
- 25-31 July – 3rd World Women's U16 Water Polo Championship at the ŠRC Mladost in Zagreb.

=== August ===
- 3-9 August – 3rd World Men's U16 Water Polo Championship at the ŠRC Mladost in Zagreb. Croatian team becomes world champions by defeating Spain in the final.
- 10-16 August – Croatia competed at the 27th European Athletics Championships in Birmingham with 16 athletes; Sara Kolak won gold in javelin throw and Marino Bloudek silver in 800 m race.
- 13-15 August – A wildfire breaks out near Lokva Rogoznica during the wildfire season and reaches areas near Split and Omiš, killing one person, injuring 43 and displacing around 2,500 others.
- 13-18 August – Both 37th Men's and 36th Women's European Artistic Gymnastics Championships were held in Arena Zagreb, with 625 gymnasts from 43 countries participating.
- 21 August–3 September – Croatia participated at the XXth Mediterranean Games in Taranto with 111 sportsmen, winning 39 medals.

=== September ===
- 31 August–6 September – 1st World 4×4 Water Polo Championship held in Dubrovnik; Croatian male squad won bronze medal, with player Roko Plicarić proclaimed as the MVP of the tournament.
- 5 September – Tens of thousands of people participate in the Walk for Lika, Walk for Croatia protest in Zagreb over the illegal disposal of toxic waste in the Lika region.
- 10 September – A student and a janitor are stabbed at a high school in Zagreb.
- 19-20 September – Fifth National meeting of Croatian Catholic families hosted by Archdiocese of Đakovo-Osijek held in Osijek and Aljmaš, presided by msgr. Đuro Hranić.
- 22–26 September – 11th CRO Race: 120 cyclist from 19 teams participated, cycling through 12 Croatian cities.

=== October ===
- 7 October – MED9 summit in Split: Croatian prime minister Andrej Plenković hosted European Commission's president Ursula von der Leyen, European Council's president António Costa, princes Albert II of Monaco and Hussein of Jordan, among others.
- 9–10 October – 46th EOC's & IOC's Olympic Solidarity Forum held in Split.
- 25 October – Gymnast Illia Kovtun wins silver medal in parallel bars at the 54th World Championship in Rotterdam, first medal for Croatia in this discipline at the World Championships.
- 31 October-13 November – Croatia competed at the IVth Summer Youth Olympics in Dakar, Senegal with 19 sportsmen in 8 sports, winning record seven medals, four of which were won by swimmer Ana Bobanović.

=== November ===
- 11–14 November – World Championship in bocce in Rijeka; Croatia won six medals.

== Deaths ==
=== January ===
- 2 January
  - Nikša Stančić, 88, historian
  - Tomislav Sabljak, 92, writer
- 9 January
  - Josip Oslić, 73, philosopher
  - Miroslav Sinčić, 89, writer
- 15 January – Ante Grgurević, 51, basketball player
- 23 January – Dalibor Brun, 76, singer

=== February ===
- 15 February – Goran Sukno, 66, water polo player
- 25 February – Katja Marasović, 65, conservator

=== March ===
- 14 March – Lovorka Čoralić, 58, historian
- 16-17 March – Zlatko Šimenc, 88, water polo player
- 26 March – Drago Balvanović, 90, prelate

=== April ===
- 5 April – Vlatko Cvrtila, 61, geopolitical analyst
- 8 April – Srećko Bogdan, 70, footballer
- 17 April – Franjo Plavšić, 80, toxicologist
- 22 April – Mijo Kovačić, 89, painter

=== May ===
- 21 May – Julienne Bušić, 77, American-born writer, hijacker (TWA Flight 355) and activist

=== June ===
- 25 June – Dražen Pinević, 62, sports journalist

=== July ===
- 2 July – Miroslav Pribanić, 81, handballer
- 29 July – Zlatko Žagmešter, 84, handballer

=== August ===
- 8 August – Ivo Šlaus, physicst
- 18 August - Vedrana Rudan, journalist, novelist and social commentator

=== September ===
- 2 September – Ivan Gudelj, 66, footballer
- 13 September – Nedjeljko Frančula, 89, carthographer
- 15 September – Malkica Dugeč, 91, writer
- 24 September – Boris Sakač, 82, IT expert

=== October ===
- 31 October – Mišo Kovač, 85, singer

=== November ===
- 3 November – Marin Srakić, 89, Catholic prelate
- 10 November – Željko Matuš, 92, footballer

== Holidays ==
- 1 January – New Year's Day
- 6 January – Epiphany
- 5 April – Easter Sunday
- 6 April – Easter Monday
- 1 May – Labour Day
- 30 May - Statehood Day
- 4 June – Feast of Corpus Christi
- 22 June – Anti-Fascist Struggle Day
- 5 August – Victory and Homeland Thanksgiving Day
- 15 August – Assumption Day
- 1 November – All Saints' Day
- 18 November – Remembrance Day
- 25 December – Christmas Day
- 26 December – Saint Stephen's Day

== See also ==
- 2026 in the European Union
- 2026 in Europe
