= Mandy-Rae Cruickshank =

Canadian world champion freediver and record holder

- Born: May 10, 1974 (age 51); Canada
- Occupation: Professional diver
- Known for: Freediving record holder
- Spouse: Kirk Krack
- Children: 1

Mandy-Rae Cruickshank (born May 10, 1974, in Canada) is a world champion free-diver and record-holder from Vancouver, British Columbia.

Cruickshank holds several Canadian and world records. She set the women's world record for constant ballast by diving to a depth of 88 metres (289 ft) on one breath, in April 2007 in the Cayman Islands. On April 8, 2005, Cruickshank set the new world record in the Constant Weight without fins discipline, free-diving to 50m. On April 11, 2005, she set the new world record in the Free Immersion discipline, diving to 74m by pulling herself down and up a line.

As captain of the Canadian free-diving team at the 2004 AIDA World Freediving Championships, the women's team (consisting of Cruickshank and teammates Jade Leutenegger and Jessica Apedaile) took first place.

In May 2006 she was the subject of media attention as one of stage magician David Blaine's Drowned Alive show safety divers (as a member of the Performance Freediving Team). Along with Martin Štěpánek she dove into Blaine's water-filled sphere to rescue him from drowning during his failed 9-minute breath-holding stunt.

She was also cast in the 2009 documentary film The Cove.

Cruickshank was inducted into the Women Divers Hall of Fame in 2009.

== Records and statistics ==
=== Personal best performances ===
- Static: 6 minutes, 25 seconds
- Dynamic: 131.0 m
- Dynamic without Fins: 100 m
- Constant Ballast: 88.0 m
- Constant Ballast without Fins: 52.0 m
- Free Immersion 74.0 m
- No Limits: 136.0 m

=== Canadian records held ===
- 10 records

=== World records held ===
- 6 records

apnea	Record	Date	Location
CNF	41 m	9 January 2003	Vancouver, BC
