= Herbert Nitsch =

Austrian freediver and world record holder

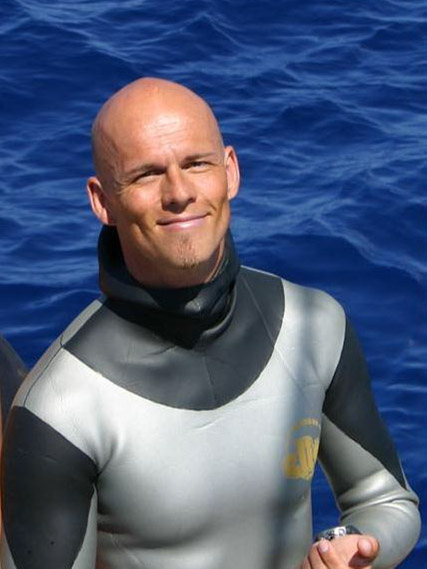
- Nitsch in 2012
- Born: 20 April 1970 (age 56); Austria
- Occupations: World Record Holder Free-diver and Air pilot

Herbert Nitsch (born 20 April 1970) is an Austrian freediver, the current freediving world record champion, and "the deepest man on earth" having dived to a depth of 253.2 meters (831 feet).

Nitsch has held 33 world records across eight freediving disciplines recognised by AIDA International and one in the traditional Greek discipline of Skandalopetra.

== Competitive freediving ==
During his career, Nitsch has held 32 world records across eight AIDA-recognised disciplines: Dynamic Apnea, Dynamic apnea without fins, Static Apnea, Constant Weight, Constant Weight without Fins, Free Immersion, Variable Weight, and No-Limits. Currently AIDA is no longer involved in No-Limits events.

=== Dynamic Apnea and Dynamic without Fins ===
Nitsch's first Dynamic Apnea record made in January 2001 was also the first world record with a monofin. Prior to that, bi-fins (stereo fins) were used. His last Dynamic Apnea record of 183 m (600 ft) set in 2002, was bested by Tom Sietas.

During Nitsch's first Dynamic without Fins record of 131 m (430 ft), he introduced the neckweight (a weighted thick necklace, which he made by filling a bicycle innertube with lead pallets). The neckweight allowed him to swim more horizontally and hydrodynamically underwater compared to a weight belt around the waist. Tom Sietas beat Nitsch's last 2001 distance of 134 m (440 ft).

=== Constant Weight and Constant Weight without Fins ===
Nitsch also held the world record in the Constant Weight event, which is considered by many to be the classic free-diving discipline: the diver descends next to a line, not using the line and unaided by a sled, and must maintain a constant weight, meaning that no weight can be dropped for the return to the surface.

Nitsch exceeded the then world record depth in 2006 when he dived to a depth of 110 m (361 ft), but failure to complete the strict surfacing protocols within the allotted time meant that the dive was disqualified.

In Hurghada, Egypt, in December 2006, he set a Constant Weight world record dive of 111 m (364 ft), exceeding Guillaume Néry's previous record by 2 m.

In April 2009 he set a Constant Weight world record Vertical Blue competition at the Dean's Blue Hole in the Bahamas of 114 m (374 ft) and 120 m (394 ft). In 2010 he improved this to respectively 123 m (404 ft) and 124 m (407 ft) at the same location.

His record of 66 m (217 ft) for Constant Weight without Fins, set in 2004, was beaten by 14 m in 2005 by Czech free-diver, Martin Štěpánek.

In October of 2007, he set the Constant Weight without Fins record to 83 m (272 ft) during The Triple Depth in Dahab, Egypt, and went on to push the Constant Weight record to 112 m (367 ft) during the World Championships in Sharm. Herbert also won the AIDA Individual World Championships.

=== Static Apnea ===
Nitsch set a time of 9 mins 4 secs for the world Static Apnea record in December 2006 when he held his breath underwater in a swimming pool in Hurgada.

=== Free Immersion and Variable Weight ===
Nitsch dove to a Free Immersion world record of 100 m (328 ft) in September 2003 (the first freediver to reach this depth in a competition), but his record was bettered by a dive of 101 m by Carlos Coste of Venezuela in October the same year and then twice improved upon by Štěpánek.

During the 2009 Vertical Blue competition at the Dean's Blue Hole in the Bahamas in April, Nitsch set the Free Immersion world record at 109 m (358 ft), which he improved later that year to 112 m (367 ft), and in 2010 to 114 m (374 ft) and 120 m (394 ft) on the last day of the competition, beating by 6 m the previous record that he had set a few days earlier. He used his arms only in the last 40 m (131 ft) of this ascent, with a total dive time of 3:58.

In December of 2009 at the Dean's Blue Hole in the Bahamas, Nitsch broke three world records in three subsequent days: Variable Weight at 142 m (466 ft); Free Immersion at 112 m (367 ft); and Constant Weight at 123 m (404 ft).

=== Retirement ===
During his last competition before retiring from competitive freediving, in April 2010 at Vertical Blue again at the Dean's Blue Hole in Bahamas, Nitsch set another three world records. He landed two subsequent ones in Free Immersion at 114 m (374 ft) and 120 m (394 ft), and a world record in Constant Weight at 124 m (407 ft).

Nitsch focused solely on the No Limit discipline after this, in which the record attempts fall outside of regulated competition.

== No Limit freediving ==
Nitsch holds the No-Limits record and the title of "Deepest man on Earth" in which the diver uses a weighted sled to descend as far as possible and uses an air-filled balloon or other buoyancy device to return to the surface.

=== World record ===
Nitsch set the No Limit world record in Spetses, Greece in June 2007 when he descended to 214 m (702 ft), beating his own subsequent records of respectively 172 m (564 ft),183 m (600 ft), and 185 m (607 ft).

=== Later attempt and serious injury ===
In 2012, Nitsch returned to the "No Limit" category in the waters off Santorini, Greece, with a project labeled "Extreme 800", aiming for a depth of 244 m (801 ft).

Following extensive training using an innovative torpedo-type sled design of very high descend and ascend speed, on 6 June 2012, Nitsch managed to reach a depth of 253.2 meters (831 ft), a Guinness World Record, but ten minutes after the dive he began experiencing serious symptoms of decompression sickness. Nitsch temporarily fell asleep due to nitrogen narcosis during the last part of the ascent (as opposed to through oxygen starvation), and woke up prior to reaching the surface. Following a planned post-dive decompression, breathing medical oxygen at a shallow depth, he signaled to his support team that he felt much weaker than normal and his condition was assessed as critical enough to require an air transfer to a pre-alerted decompression chamber in Athens, where he received treatment. He incurred multiple brain strokes due to severe decompression sickness. He subsequently received extensive decompression treatment in Germany.

The initial prognosis was that he would need home care and be unable to walk without assistance. However, through extensive rehabilitation, he made a strong recovery. He still has balance and coordination problems on land, but does not experience them underwater. He continues to deep free-dive.

== Other career ==
Nitsch also worked as a pilot and Captain for Tyrolean Airways for fifteen years. He flew full-time from 1995 until 2008, and thereafter part-time until late 2010.

== Awards and honors ==
The asteroid 295471 Herbertnitsch, discovered by Italian amateur astronomer Vincenzo Casulli in 2008, was named in his honor. The official naming citation was published by the Minor Planet Center on 27 August 2019 (M.P.C. 115895).

== Official records ==
Nitsch remains to date the only person that achieved world records across all of AIDA's eight freediving disciplines, in addition to the one he had set in the Greek discipline of Skandalopetra.

apnea	Federation	Record	Date	Location
DNF	AIDA	131 m (430 ft)	27 January 2001	Geneva
DYN	AIDA	170 m (558 ft)	24 February 2001	Geneva
CWT	AIDA	72 m (236 ft)*	16 June 2001	Millstätter See
CWT	AIDA	86 m (282 ft)	11 October 2001	Ibiza
DYN	AIDA	172 m (564 ft)	10 November 2001	Berlin
DNF	AIDA	134 m (440 ft)	24 November 2001	Wiesbaden
DYN	AIDA	181 m (594 ft)	2 February 2002	Vienna
FIM	AIDA	92 m (302 ft)	27 February 2002	Austria
DYN	AIDA	183 m (600 ft)	16 November 2002	Berlin
FIM	AIDA	100 m (328 ft)	5 September 2003	Millstätter See
CWT	AIDA	95 m (312 ft)	5 September 2003	Millstätter See
CNF	AIDA	50 m (164 ft)	6 September 2003	Millstätter See
CNF	AIDA	62 m (203 ft)	11 September 2004	Spetses (Greece)
CNF	AIDA	66 m (217 ft)	12 September 2004	Spetses
NLT	AIDA	172 m (564 ft)	2 October 2005	Žirje (Croatia)
NLT	AIDA	183 m (600 ft)	28 August 2006	Žirje
CWT	AIDA	111 m (364 ft)	9 December 2006	Hurghada (Egypt)
STA	AIDA	9 min 04 sec	13 December 2006	Hurghada
NLT	AIDA	185 m (607 ft)	13 June 2007	Spetses
NLT	AIDA	214 m (702 ft)	14 June 2007	Spetses
CNF	AIDA	83 m (272 ft)	21 October 2007	Dahab (Egypt)
CWT	AIDA	112 m (367 ft)	1 November 2007	Sharm (Egypt)
CWT	AIDA	114 m (374 ft)	4 April 2009	Long Island (Bahamas)
FIM	AIDA	109 m (358 ft)	6 April 2009	Long Island (Bahamas)
CWT	AIDA	120 m (394 ft)	11 April 2009	Long Island (Bahamas)
SKA		107 m (351 ft)	26 June 2009	Lindos (Greece)
VWT	AIDA	142 m (466 ft)	7 December 2009	Long Island (Bahamas)
FIM	AIDA	112 m (367 ft)	8 December 2009	Long Island (Bahamas)
CWT	AIDA	123 m (404 ft)	9 December 2009	Long Island (Bahamas)
FIM	AIDA	114 m (374 ft)	19 April 2010	Long Island (Bahamas)
CWT	AIDA	124 m (407 ft)	22 April 2010	Long Island (Bahamas)
FIM	AIDA	120 m (394 ft)	25 April 2010	Long Island (Bahamas)
NLT	Guinness WR	253.2 m (831 ft)	6 June 2012	Santorini

72m = AIDA Lake Record; after 2001-12-31 AIDA International no longer separated the records achieved in a lake from those in the sea.

== Personal bests ==
Discipline		Result	Accreditation
Time	STA	9:04 min	AIDA
Distance	DNF	138 m	AIDA
Distance	DYN	183 m	AIDA
Depth	CNF	83 m	AIDA
Depth	CWT	124 m	AIDA
Depth	FIM	120 m	AIDA
Depth	VWT	142 m	AIDA
Depth	NLT	253.2 m 214 m	Guinness WR; AIDA
Depth	SP	107 m	

== Filmography ==
Documentaries and TV

- 2017: Herbert Nitsch, The Deepest Man On Earth, by UPROXX – Video on YouTube
- 2016: Supertalent Mensch: Körperbeherrscher, by Terra X – Video on YouTube
- 2013: Back from the Abyss / Züruck as der Tiefe, the multiple award-winning documentary by Red Bull Media House - Trailer Back from the Abyss: Video on Vimeo and Video on YouTube
- 2012: La Dernière Frontière, by Camera Lucida - Video on YouTube
- 2011: The man who can hold his breath for nine minutes – Inside the Human Body: First to Last, by BBC One- Video on YouTube
- 2009: Apnoetauchen: Neun Minuten ohne einen Atemzug, by Focus Online – Video on YouTube
- 2009: Stefan Raab by TV Total Video on Vimeo
- 2009: Aeschbacher by SRF Video on Vimeo

Publicity

- 2017: Hyundai Fuel Cell Car Unveiling, by Hyundai - Video on Vimeo and Video on YouTube
- 2011: Extreme 800, by Breitling - Video on YouTube

== See also ==
- Physiology of freediving
