= Cayman Islands freediving records =

The national freediving records for the Cayman Islands are maintained by the Cayman Islands Freediving Association (CFA).

Freediving records can be set in any of 6 categories:

- Constant weight
- Static apnea
- Dynamic apnea
- Free immersion
- Variable weight
- No-limits

Record attempts are generally made during competitions or at special events. Variable weight and no-limits are not competitive disciplines and so attempts in these categories need to be specially arranged.

== Records and achievements ==
Date	Discipline	Record	Holder	Competition	Association	Location Set
14 May 2017	FIM	51 M	Richard Collett	Deja Blue 8	AIDA	Grand Cayman
14 May 2017	CWT	51 M	Richard Collett	Deja Blue 8	AIDA	Grand Cayman
15 May 2017	DNF	106 M	Richard Collett	Deja Blue 8	AIDA	Grand Cayman
18 May 2017	CNF	51 M	Richard Collett	Deja Blue 8	AIDA	Grand Cayman
19 May 2017	STA	5:48	Richard Collett	Deja Blue 8	AIDA	Grand Cayman
20 May 2017	FIM	54 M	Richard Collett	Deja Blue 8	AIDA	Grand Cayman
20 May 2017	DYN	146 M	Richard Collett	Deja Blue 8	AIDA	Grand Cayman
21 May 2017	CWT	54 M	Richard Collett	Deja Blue 8	AIDA	Grand Cayman
6 May 2018	CWT	62 M	Richard Collett	Deja Blue 9	AIDA	Grand Cayman
7 May 2018	FIM	64 M	Richard Collett	Deja Blue 9	AIDA	Grand Cayman
7 May 2018	DYN	153 M	Richard Collett	Deja Blue 9	AIDA	Grand Cayman
11 May 2018	CNF	55 M	Richard Collett	Deja Blue 9	AIDA	Grand Cayman
2 June 2018	STA	6:17	Richard Collett	South Florida Apnea Challenge	AIDA	Miami, FL
2 June 2018	DNF	114 M	Richard Collett	South Florida Apnea Challenge	AIDA	Miami, FL
3 June 2018	DYN	166 M	Richard Collett	South Florida Apnea Challenge	AIDA	Miami, FL
18 May 2019	CWTB	55 M	Richard Collett	Rotan School of Freediving	Cayman Islands Freediving Association	Rotan, Honduras
22 May 2019	CWTB	60 M	Richard Collett	Rotan School of Freediving	Cayman Islands Freediving Association	Rotan, Honduras
22 May 2019	FIM	65 M	Richard Collett	Rotan School of Freediving	Cayman Islands Freediving Association	Rotan, Honduras

The first official competition dive to a depth of beyond 200 ft occurred on 6 May 2018 - CWT - Richard Collett
