= Dave Mullins (freediver) =

New Zealand freediver and world record-holder

Dave Mullins is a New Zealand freediver and world record-holder.

On 21 September 2007 Mullins improved on the then existing Dynamic apnea World record of 225 m held by Stig Severinsen, breaking it by 1 minute (226 meters in a time of 3:38). On 23 September 2007 Mullins improved on his own world record by 18 m of 244 meters in a time of 4:02.

In August 2008 Mullins equaled the world record for Dynamic apnea Dynamic No Fins (SNF), previously set by Tom Sietas of Germany at 213 meters which they held until September 2010. Then, on Monday 27 September 2010 Mullins executed a DNF swim of 218 meters on a single breath to claim the world record as his alone. Dave's record-setting 218 meter DNF took 4 minutes and 11 seconds. Dave also holds the New Zealand national record in this category at 232 meters (his personal best, though not registered as a world record).

On 10 September 2008 during the Sharm 2008 Freediving World championships, Dave once again broke his own Dynamic world record at 248 meters. This was surpassed by Alexey Molchanov of Russia at 250 meters. Mullins surpassed this on 25 September 2010 with a 265-meter swim while holding his breath for 4:01.

Dave set the New Zealand Constant Weight diving record in April 2008 to 108 meters at the Vertical Blue Invitational, Long Island, Bahamas.

In 2017, Mullins won a gold medal at the world championships in Roatan, Honduras, plunging to a new national record depth of 126 metres.

The achievement in the constant weight with fins category beat his previous best of 125m, which was set in 2013.
