= 2025 in Croatia =

- Decades: 2000s; 2010s; 2020s
- See also: Other events of 2025; Timeline of Croatian history

Events in the year 2025 in Croatia.

== Incumbents ==
- President: Zoran Milanović
- Prime Minister: Andrej Plenković

== Events ==
=== January ===
- 8 January – 2 February – Croatia co-hosted 2025 World Men's Handball Championship with Denmark and Norway. Croatia won silver medal.
- 12 January – 2024–25 Croatian presidential election (second round): Incumbent president Zoran Milanović wins a second term in office with 74% of the vote.
- 24 January – A nationwide shopping boycott is held by consumer groups in protest over inflation.

=== February ===
- 3 – 9 February – 2025 Men's and Women's FIH Indoor Hockey World Cup
- 11 February – A magnitude 4.6 earthquake hits Zadar County, injuring several people.
- 14 February – Thirteen people are arrested on suspicion of membership in a criminal network that illegally imported and disposed of at least 35,000 tons hazardous waste from Italy, Slovenia and Germany into Croatia.

=== May ===
- 18 May – 2025 Croatian local elections (first round)

=== June ===
- 1 June – 2025 Croatian local elections (second round)

=== July ===
- 3 July – The municipal court of Bjelovar convicts Kresimir Pahoki for carrying out the Daruvar shooting which killed six people in 2024 and sentences him to 50 years' imprisonment.

=== November ===
- 13 November – An Air Tractor AT-802 aircraft belonging to the Turkish General Directorate of Forestry crashes near Senj, killing the pilot.
- 14 November – Croatia qualifies for the 2026 FIFA World Cup after defeating the Faroe Islands 3-1 at the 2026 FIFA World Cup qualification in Rijeka.
- 17 November – A fire destroys the Vjesnik Tower in Zagreb.
- 30 November – Rallies against the far-right are held in Zagreb, Rijeka, Pula, and Zadar with an estimated attendance of 10,000.

=== December ===
- 1 December – Nine people are arrested in Rijeka following clashes between demonstrators on 30 November.
- 11 December – A boat carrying migrants capsizes along the Sava River in Slavonski Brod on the border with Bosnia, killing one passenger.
- 23 December — A court in Zagreb sentences a 20-year old suspect in a December 2024 school stabbing in the city that left one child dead and four people injured to the maximum penalty of 50 years' imprisonment.

== Holidays ==
- 1 January – New Year's Day
- 6 January – Epiphany
- 20 April – Easter Sunday
- 21 April – Easter Monday
- 1 May – Labour Day
- 30 May - National Day
- 19 June – Feast of Corpus Christi
- 22 June – Anti-Fascist Struggle Day
- 5 August – Victory and Homeland Thanksgiving Day
- 15 August – Assumption Day
- 1 November – All Saints' Day
- 18 November – Remembrance Day
- 25 December – Christmas Day
- 26 December – Saint Stephen's Day

2025 was also celebrated as the 1100th Anniversary of the Croatian Kingdom in Croatia.

== Art and entertainment ==
- List of Croatian submissions for the Academy Award for Best International Feature Film

== Deaths ==
- 18 April – Nikola Pokrivač, 39, footballer.

== See also ==
- 2025 in the European Union
- 2025 in Europe
