= Goran Čolak =

Croatian free-diver and world record holder

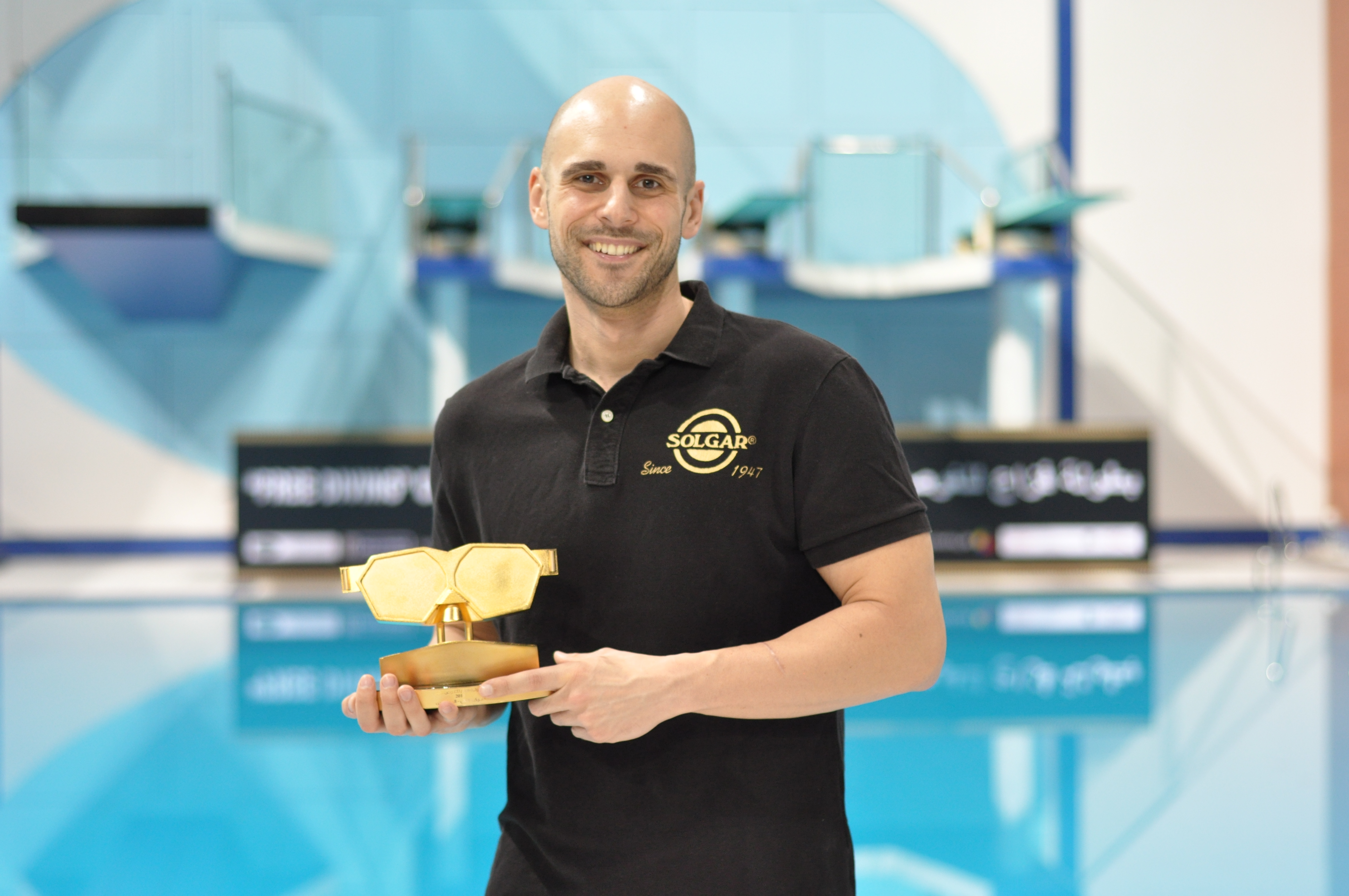
Čolak after one of his Dubai wins, 2013

Goran Čolak (born 24 April 1983 in Zagreb) is a Croatian free-diver.

== Career ==
Čolak started his amateur free diving career in 2006 when he entered his first competition, the Submania Cup in Zagreb. Less than one year later, he won his first Croatian championship and broke several national records. Čolak turned professional in 2011 and joined the exclusive group of free diving professionals around the world.

Čolak was the 2009 Confédération Mondiale des Activités Subaquatiques (CMAS) World Champion and world record holder in a joint event with AIDA International (AIDA), the strongest free diving organization in the world. Čolak dove 244 m in dynamic apnea with fins and won CMAS and overall first place, breaking the CMAS world record.

Čolak was the 2011 CMAS World Champion in dynamic apnea with fins, with a 250 m swim, setting a new CMAS world record, his fourth CMAS world record in his short career. On October 16, 2011, he became the AIDA International world champion in the same event (AIDA World Championship in Lignano, Italy), and set the new AIDA world record of 273 m, surpassing the previous record of 265 m held by Dave Mullins. At the same event he won two gold medals, one silver medal and set a new world record.

Čolak won the 2012 AIDA Team World Championship, held in Nice, France with Veljano Zanki and Božidar Petani as his teammates. This was first appearance and first gold medal for the Croatian team at a team World Championships. In addition to gold medal the Croatian team set the new all-time best in points with 840.6 points, beating the previous record of 839 points set by the Denmark team at Okinawa in 2010.

Čolak competed in 2013 Belgrade Pool World Championship, and won all three gold medals from each of the pool disciplines and set one world record. Goran Čolak won the dynamic apnea without fins finals with a 206 m dive, the dynamic apnea with fins with a 281 m dive, which beat his current world record of 273 m set in 2011. On the third day he won his third gold medal in static, holding his breath for 8 minutes and 59 seconds. Čolak was dominating the Belgrade World Championship from the very beginning to the end, winning every qualification heat and every final. His results in qualifications were 182 m in DNF, 250 m in DYN and 8:34 min in STA.

Čolak competed in 2013 at CMAS World Games in Kazan, Russia. He again broke a Croatian national record in static apnea to 9:18 min and won bronze medal. At the same competition he won two silver medals in dynamic apnea with fins (260 m) and dynamic apnea without fins (194 m). Čolak was the only male athlete who won medals in all three disciplines in Kazan.

Čolak announced an AIDA WR attempt in Belgrade from 21 to 27 November 2013. He succeeded on the first day with a 225 m dive, adding 7 m to the old record that was held by Dave Mullins from New Zealand.

Čolak was a member of Croatian national team at AIDA Team World Championship in Sardinia 2014. He was the most successful athlete of the entire competition in overall points. He set two Team WCh records, one in static (9:13 min), and one in dynamic with fins (250 m). Unfortunately, Croatian team finished fourth, after two other members, Bozidar Petani and Bruno Segvic earned two disqualifications or red cards in dynamic with fins and constant weight.

Čolak competed in 2014 CMAS European championship in Spain (Tenerife), as a member of Croatian national team. He broke CMAS and overall World Record in dynamic apnea with fins, with a 288 m swim, adding 23 m to the CMAS WR (previously held by Aleksandr Kostyshen from Russia) and 7 m to the overall AIDA and CMAS WR (which was his own 281 m AIDA dive from 2013). He also won a gold medal in that discipline. He also won a silver medal in static apnea.

In 2015, Čolak took part at his third Individual AIDA Pool World championship, Belgrade, Serbia. He won one silver (STA), and one bronze medal (DNF), making this the first AIDA WCh where he did not win medals in all the disciplines. Čolak also announced that, at this point, he would start moving from pool to the depth disciplines.

At 2015 AIDA depth World championship, which was held in Limassol Cyprus, Čolak had his depth debut. He broke all three depth national records with dives to 71 m in CNF, 108 m in CWT and 98 m in FIM. He was awarded silver medal for his Constant weight dive to 108 m and was an overall winner of the Championship. For the first time AIDA awarded the overalls. The award is called "Natalia Molchanova award", in honor of the late Natalia Molchanova, the most successful female freediver of all time. Čolak became the first person who received this award.

Later in 2015, Čolak took part at the first CMAS depth World championship in Ischia, Italy. He competed in Constant weight (CWT), same discipline where he won silver medal earlier that year at AIDA World championship in Cyprus with a dive of 108 m. This time he dove 110 m, winning the gold medal and setting the new CMAS World record.

In 2016, Čolak competed at AIDA individual World championship in Turku, Finland. As the only athlete representing Croatia he managed to win one silver medal in static with the time of 9:14 min. Later that year he suffered some medical issues with the kidney stone and DCS during the depth training in Croatia. This forced him to finish the 2016 season and focus on recovery and next season.

In June 2017, Čolak competed at CMAS European pool championship in Cagliari, Italy. He competed in all 4 free diving disciplines winning three gold medals and one silver medal. Gold medals were as follows: Dynamic no fins with 206 m and new WR for 50 m pool, Static with the time of 9:58.66 min (new CMAS national record) and Dynamic with fins with the distance of 279 m. One silver medal was for Dynamic with BiFins with the distance of 244 m.

In October 2017, Čolak competed at CMAS European depth championship in Kas, Turkey. He competed in all 3 depth disciplines winning silver medal on the first day in CWT with a dive to 113 m, second day he won the gold in CNF with a dive to 83 m, and the third day he was DQ in CWT Bi fins for a rope pull, during a (silver medal) dive to 105m.

During 2018 CMAS World Championship in Lignano, Italy, Čolak won two gold medals. One in Static (9:03min) and the second one in Dynamic with monofin (279 m), in addition to that he also won one silver medal in Dynamic with Bifins (257 m). Once again he was the most successful athlete of the whole championship.

Čolak announced that he will take the whole 2019 competitive season free of competitions in order to better prepare for next year and new challenges in pool and depth disciplines.

Čolak made his official comeback to competing at the highest stage at CMAS World championship in Kuwait 2023. He won gold medal in DYN BF with a new World record of 292m and a bronze medal in DYN with a dive of 299.5m.

At CMAS pool World Championship in Belgrade 2024 Čolad won silver medal in DYN with a dive of 286m. He also had a dive of 294m in DYN BF, distance greater than his previous WR but was disqualified due to surface protocol.

At the 2026 CMAS World Championship Freediving Indoor in Novi Sad, Serbia, Čolak won the gold medal in Dynamic with BiFins (DYN BF) with a 300 m dive, equalling the world-record mark in the discipline.

Čolak is one of the most successful male athletes from AIDA and CMAS World and European Championships with 18 gold, 9 silver and 4 bronze medals.

Čolak was nominated for Croatian athlete of the year in 2009, 2010, 2011, and 2013, 2014, 2016, 2017, 2018 and 2019.

In 2018, Čolak received a special award from the Croatian Olympic committee ('Franjo Bučar award for outstanding sports achievements'). Two years later, in 2019, he received the special award 'Red Danice sa likom Franje Bučara', for achievements in sport and promotion of the Republic of Croatia, from Croatian president Kolinda Grabar-Kitarović.

Čolak won the Dubai Range Rover challenge five times (2011, 2012, 2015, 2017, 2018) and came second in 2013, 2014, 2016, 2019, 2023.

Čolak announced on September 28, 2013, that he would attempt to break the world record in static apnea on pure oxygen, held by Tom Sietas with a time of 22 minutes 22 seconds. Goran succeeded by holding his breath, at the Zagreb main square, for 22 min 30 sec, setting the new Guinness World Record. On 20 June 2014 he improved his record to 23:01.

At the 11th Fazza Freediving Competition (2017), he won the static apnea competition with 10:19, which was his personal static apnea record at a competition, besting his time of 10:07 set in the qualifying round. Although not AIDA or CMAS competition this was the first time he recorded time over 10 minutes in STA at a competition.

At the 12th Fazza Freediving Competition (2018), he won the static apnea competition with 11:06.14, earning his fifth Fazza title and establishing the competition all-time record.

At the 2026 Fazza Championship for Freediving, held at Hamdan Sports Complex in Dubai, Čolak won the professional category with a time of 8:30.16, earning his sixth Fazza title.

== Official world records ==
BF - BiFins
Bolded for overall WR under all federations. STA O2 is overall WR but discipline is not official by AIDA or CMAS.

| Discipline | Association | Record | Date | Location |
|---|---|---|---|---|
| DYN BF | CMAS | 300 m | 12 Jun 2026 | Novi Sad |
| DYN BF | CMAS | 292.15 m | 10 May 2023 | Kuwait |
| DYN BF | CMAS | 275.9 m | 4 Mar 2023 | Rijeka |
| CNF | CMAS | 83 m | 4 Oct 2017 | Kas |
| DYN BF | CMAS | 244 m | 16 Jun 2017 | Cagliari |
| DNF | CMAS | 206 m | 14 Jun 2017 | Cagliari |
| DYN BF | CMAS | 229.8 m | 9 Apr 2017 | Zagreb |
| CWT | CMAS | 110 m | 6 Oct 2015 | Ischia |
| DYN | CMAS | 288 m | 17 Oct 2014 | Tenerife |
| STA O2 | Guinness | 23:01 min | 20 Jun 2014 | Vir |
| DNF | AIDA | 225 m | 21 Nov 2013 | Pančevo |
| STA O2 | Guinness | 22:32 min | 29 Sep 2013 | Zagreb |
| DYN | AIDA | 281 m | 28 Jun 2013 | Belgrade |
| Team * | AIDA | 840.6 pts | 16 Sep 2012 | Nice |
| DYN | AIDA | 273 m | 16 Oct 2011 | Lignano |
| DYN | CMAS | = 250 m | 1 Oct 2011 | Tenerife |
| DYN | CMAS | 250 m | 7 May 2011 | Zagreb |
| DYN | CMAS | 248.52 m | 13 Sep 2010 | Zagreb |
| DYN | CMAS | 244.33 m | 22 Aug 2008 | Aarhus |
| DYN | CMAS | 189.48 m | 16 Jun 2007 | Split |

* team: Goran Čolak, Božidar Petani and Veljano Zanki

== World championships medal list ==
| Association | Gold | Silver | Bronze | WR's |
|---|---|---|---|---|
| AIDA | 6 | 3 | 1 | 3 |
| CMAS | 13 | 7 | 3 | 11 |

== Personal bests ==
| Discipline | | Result | Accreditation |
|---|---|---|---|
| Time | STA | 9:58min | CMAS |
| Time | STA O2 | 23:01min | Guinness |
| Distance | DNF | 225m | AIDA |
| Distance | DYN | 300m | CMAS |
| Distance | DYN BF | 300m | CMAS |
| Distance | JB | 170m | CMAS |
| Depth | CNF | 83m | CMAS |
| Depth | CWT | 115m | AIDA |
| Depth | CWT BF | 105m | CMAS |
| Depth | FIM | 98m | AIDA |

- Distance in pool disciplines is rounded to the closest meter.
