= Inge Verbruggen =

Freediver athlete

Inge Verbruggen (born 20 September 1964) is a Belgian freediver athlete.

She broke several times Belgian National records in four different freediving disciplines. Inge has the rare ability to dive "handsfree", which means that she doesn't need her hands to equalize her ears.

== Career ==
Inge Verbruggen has worked for 8 years in a transportation company before deciding to change career.

Inge now has her own jewellery studio and shop in Temse. In parallel she trains freediving 3 times per week. Inge trains once per week in Nemo33, a swimming pool that is 33 meters deep. Whenever possible Inge goes to Dahab to train and participate to competitions.

She is also a SSI Freediving instructor and an AIDA (Association Internationale pour le Développement de l'Apnée - International Association for the Development of Apnea) freediving instructor.

She is part of the AIDA Belgium board since 18 July 2018.

== Awards ==
She broke the following records:

- Inge broke the Belgian National Record in freediving constant weight (CWT) discipline in Dahab with a performance of -48m. On 24 October she broke her own national record and reached -53m.
- On 28 April 2017, Inge broke the Belgian National record in Free Immersion (FIM) in Dahab with a performance of -46m. On 13 November 2018 she broke her own national record and reached -55m.
- On 28 April 2017, Inge broke the Belgian National record in Variable Weight (VWT) with a performance of -56m.
- On 1 May 2017, Inge broke the Belgian National record in No Limits (NLT) with a performance of -61m.
