= 2027 in Croatia =

- Decades: 2000s; 2010s; 2020s
- See also: Other events of 2027; Timeline of Croatian history

Events in the year 2027 in Croatia.

== Events ==
=== Predicted and scheduled events ===
- 14–21 March – UEFA Women's Futsal Euro 2027

== Holidays ==
- 1 January – New Year's Day
- 6 January – Epiphany
- 28 March – Easter Sunday
- 29 March – Easter Monday
- 1 May – Labour Day
- 27 May – Feast of Corpus Christi
- 30 May - Statehood Day
- 22 June – Anti-Fascist Struggle Day
- 5 August – Victory and Homeland Thanksgiving Day
- 15 August – Assumption Day
- 1 November – All Saints' Day
- 18 November – Remembrance Day
- 25 December – Christmas Day
- 26 December – Saint Stephen's Day

== See also ==
- 2027 in the European Union
- 2027 in Europe
