= 2024 in Croatia =

- Decades: 2000s; 2010s; 2020s
- See also: Other events of 2024; Timeline of Croatian history

Events in the year 2024 in Croatia.

== Incumbents ==
- President: Zoran Milanović
- Prime Minister: Andrej Plenković

== Events ==
=== January ===
- 4–16 January – 2024 Men's European Water Polo Championship
- 10–14 January – 2024 Grand Prix Zagreb Open

=== February ===
- 17 February – Zagreb protest
- 19–24 February – 2024 European Indoor Archery Championships at Varaždin

=== March ===
- 11–17 March – 2024 IIHF Women's World Championship Division III A at Zagreb
- 15 March – 2024 Croatian parliamentary election: The Croatian government votes to dissolve the parliament, thereby requiring that a parliamentary election be held within the next two months. The parliamentary election was originally scheduled to be held on September 22.

=== April ===
- 15 April - Death of Josip Manolic in Zagreb
- 17 April – 2024 Croatian parliamentary election: Voters go to the polls to elect members to the Sabor. The ruling Croatian Democratic Union and its coalition win the most seats, but fail to obtain a majority.
- 25–28 April – 2024 European Judo Championships

=== May ===
- 5 May – Andrej Plenković wins a third term as prime minister after his HDZ party enters into a coalition agreement with the Homeland Movement.
- 15 May – Twenty-two boats are destroyed in a fire at a marina in Medulin.
- 16 May – A car carrying illegal migrants crashes into a wall near Sinj, killing four passengers.

=== June ===
- 6–9 June – 2024 European Parliament election in Croatia
- 11 June – A man self-immolates at St. Mark's Square in Zagreb.
- 20 June – A child is killed and three others are injured after an explosive taken by the child from a restricted military zone explodes near Zadar.
- 21 June – A massive power outage leaves the coastal areas of the country without electricity.

=== July ===
- 22 July – Daruvar shooting: Six people are killed in a shooting inside an elderly care home in Daruvar. The suspect is arrested.
- 25 July – The Croatian government declares the President of the Parliament of Montenegro Andrija Mandić, Montenegrin deputy prime minister Aleksa Bečić and Montenegrin MP Milan Knežević persona non grata following the passage of a resolution in the Montenegrin Parliament recognising a genocide in the Jasenovac concentration camp committed by the pro-Axis Independent State of Croatia during World War II.

=== September ===
- 9 September – A van carrying migrants hits a lamp post in the east of the country while evading police, injuring 14 people.

=== October ===
- 5 October – A van carrying migrants overturns near Peklenica, killing two passengers and injuring 25 others.

=== November ===
- 15 November – Health minister Vili Beroš is arrested on suspicion of corruption and is dismissed from his post.

=== December ===
- 20 December – A seven-year old child is killed while seven others are injured in a knife attack at a primary school in Zagreb. A 19-year old suspect, a former student, is arrested.
- 29 December – 2024 Croatian presidential election (first round): Incumbent president Zoran Milanovic advances to a run-off in January 2025 along with HDZ candidate Dragan Primorac.

== Holidays ==
- 1 January - New Year's Day
- 6 January - Epiphany
- 31 March - Easter Sunday
- 1 April - Easter Monday
- 1 May - Labour Day
- 30 May - National Day
- 30 May – Feast of Corpus Christi
- 22 June - Anti-Fascist Struggle Day
- 5 August - Victory and Homeland Thanksgiving Day and the Day
- 15 August - Assumption Day
- 1 November - All Saints' Day
- 18 November – Remembrance Day
- 25 December - Christmas Day
- 26 December – Saint Stephen's Day

== Art and entertainment ==
- List of Croatian submissions for the Academy Award for Best International Feature Film

== Deaths ==
- 1 January – Mario Boljat, 72, footballer (Hajduk Split, Schalke 04, Yugoslavia national team).
- 15 April – Josip Manolić, 104, Prime Minister (1990-1991) and speaker of the Chamber of Counties (1993–1994).

== See also ==
- 2024 in the European Union
- 2024 in Europe
- Member state of the European Union
