= Stig Severinsen =

Danish freediver, record holder and author

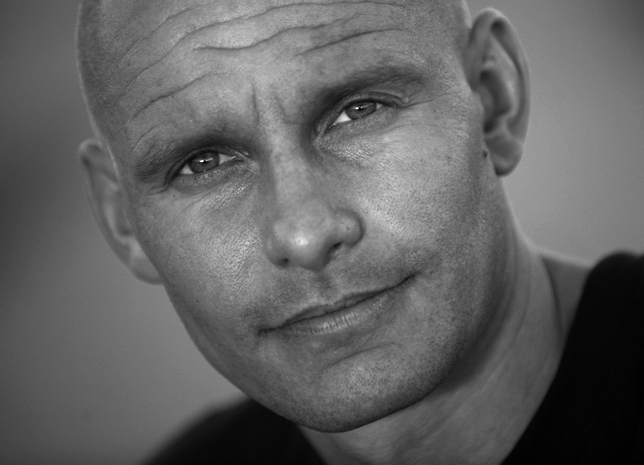
- Severinsen in 2009.
- Born: 8 March 1973 (age 53); Aalborg, Denmark
- Occupation: Freediver

Stig Åvall Severinsen (born 8 March 1973) is a Danish freediver. He is a four-time world freediving champion and holder of multiple Guinness World Records. He also wrote Træk Vejret – mere energi, mindre stress (2009), published in English in 2010 as Breatheology – The Art of Conscious Breathing.

== Background ==
Severinsen has a degree in biology and a PhD in medicine. He began experimenting with holding his breath as a child at the bottom of his parents' pool. He started swimming at the age of 6 and was awarded National Champion four years in a row at 9, 10, 11 and 12. In 1993–2003 he played Underwater Rugby, and was a member of the Danish national team. During university studies in Barcelona, Spain in 1998–99, he played underwater hockey on the Spanish national team. A fascination with long breath holds under water drew him to the world of free diving. In 2010 he founded Breatheology, an online platform teaching optimal health and performance via breathing, breath holding and mental training techniques.

== Career ==
Combining yoga and his knowledge of physiology in freediving, Severinsen became a record holder of four AIDA freediving world records. He achieved two Guinness World Records in 2010: in March that year he swam 236 feet (72 meters) under ice wearing only swimming trunks and goggles, exceeding Wim Hof's record of March 2000 by 47.6 feet (14.5 meters); and in April, after inhaling pure oxygen, he held his breath for 20 minutes and 10 seconds in a tank full of sharks at the Kattegat Centre in Grenaa. In May 2012 he was awarded the record of "Longest time breath held voluntarily (male)" by Guinness World Records for holding his breath for 22 minutes; this record was achieved in a tank at the London School of Diving with the water cooled to 30 °F (−1 °C). He held this record until 28 February 2016, when it was broken by Aleix Segura. In April 2013 in Qorlortoq Lake in east Greenland, he set two new world records for "longest swim under ice - breath held": 500 feet (150 meters) while wearing a wetsuit and monofin, taking 2 minutes, 11 seconds, and the following day, 250 feet (76 meters) wearing only swimming trunks. He announced that these would be his last record attempts and he would now concentrate on teaching.

In 2020, Severinsen came back from retirement to break another record. He swam 202 meters on a single breath at La Paz, Baja California Sur, Mexico on 26 November 2020.

Severinsen was chosen "The Ultimate Superhuman" on the Discovery Channel programme Superhuman Showdown, and a documentary about him, Stig Severinsen: The Man Who Doesn't Breathe, was produced for broadcast on Discovery and on Quest in the UK in October 2013.

In Breatheology Severinsen proposes that through working with the breath, a link can be created between body and mind that enables a person to control stress, increase energy, perform better physically and mentally, alleviate pain and improve health.

== AIDA Freediving World Records ==
Date	Record	Discipline	Location
19 July 2003	166 m	Dynamic Apnea without fins (DNF)	Aarhus, Denmark
28 Sept 2003	61 m	Constant Weight without fins (CNF)	Puerto la Cruz, Venezuela
16 June 2007	225 m	Dynamic Apnea (DYF)	Aarhus, Denmark
7 July 2007	186 m	Dynamic Apnea without fins (DNF)	Maribor, Slovenia

== Personal bests ==
Discipline		Result	Accreditation
Time	STA	8:40min	AIDA
Time	STA O2	22:00min	Guinness
Distance	DNF	186m	AIDA
Distance	DYN	225m	AIDA
Distance	DYN under ice	152.4m	Guinness
Depth	CNF	61m	AIDA
Depth	CWT	64m	AIDA
Depth	FIM	56m	AIDA

== See also ==
- Wim Hof
