= Carlos Coste =

Venezuelan freediver and world record holder

- Born: Carlos Augusto; February 2, 1976 (age 50); Caracas, Venezuela
- Occupations: Professional freediver, athlete, coach (sport)
- Known for: Surpassing 100m depth on a single breath
- Website: carloscoste.com

Carlos Coste (born on February 2, 1976) is a Venezuelan professional free diver.

== Career ==
Coste's interest in apnea and freediving began in 1996, when he joined the University Underwater Activities Club at the Central University of Venezuela. In December 2002, he broke his first AIDA world record in free immersion at a depth of -93 meters.

In September 2003, he became the first person to perform a free immersion dive exceeding 100 meters (-101m) -- a feat certified by AIDA World Records and Guinness World Records. Carlos Coste also became the first free diver to reach a depth of 102 meters in constant weight during an immersion in Cyprus in 2004. In 2005, he won the AIDA World Championship in Nice, setting a new world record of -105m in Constant Weight and earning the title of AIDA Depth Individual World Champion. He briefly held the AIDA world record for variable weight free-diving with a 140-meter immersion in the Red Sea, in Egypt in 2006, before it was surpassed by Herbert Nitsch on December 7, 2009, at Dean's Blue Hole in the Bahamas.

Carlos Coste's achievements were recognized by the Venezuela National Sports Institute and were honored with the Orden José Félix Rivas award, which was granted by the Venezuelan president in February 2005. In 2017, he was awarded the honorary membership distinction of ONDA Venezuela and joined its Underwater Activities Committee.

=== Accident ===
In September 2006, during a training dive at a depth of 182 meters in the No Limits discipline, Coste experienced a severe accident, suffering from an air embolism. He underwent a period of recovery before making his return to competitive diving. After his recovery, Carlos achieved the Pan-American Record in Dynamic Apnea with a 215-meter performance during the World Championships in Aarhus, Denmark. In the Constant Weight discipline, he reached a depth of 116 meters at the Kalamata World Championship in 2011. Coste secured a Guinness World Record in Dynamic Apnea in 2010 with a 150-meter performance in Dos Ojos Cenotes. In 2014, Coste relocated to Bonaire, a Dutch Caribbean island, where he established two freediving schools. As of 2023, he resides in Baja California, Mexico, where he is developing a new freediving adventure project.
