= Sietas =

Sietas is a German surname.

== People ==
- Erwin Sietas (1910–1989), German swimmer
- Tom Sietas (born 1977), German swimmer

== Companies ==
- Pella Sietas GmbH, a shipbuilder based in Hamburg, Germany
