= 2022 in Croatia =

- Decades: 2000s; 2010s; 2020s
- See also: Other events of 2022; Timeline of Croatian history

Events in the year 2022 in Croatia.

== Incumbents ==
- President: Zoran Milanović
- Prime Minister: Andrej Plenković

== Events ==
Ongoing — COVID-19 pandemic in Croatia

- 10 March - 2022 Zagreb Tu-141 crash
- 21-24 April - 2022 Croatia Rally
- 6 August - 2022 Croatian bus crash
