= Martin Štěpánek (freediver) =

Czech freediver and record-holder

Martin Štěpánek (born June 5, 1977 in Náchod, Czech Republic) is a world class freediver and record-holder.

== Life and career ==
From 1984 to 1997 he was a competitive monofin swimmer (finswimmer) (distances 50m and 100m). Martin's academic background follows a degree in Forestry Engineering with advanced studies in Sports Biology at the Charles University in Prague, Czech Republic. After moving to the United States he became USA Certified as a Deep Sea and Saturation Commercial Diver in May 1999. In 2000 Martin met Douglas Peterson, who went on to become his freediving coach and mentor, guiding him to his first World Record in July 2001. Since then, Martin continued to set freediving world records annually up to his retirement from competitive freediving in 2012. He is now recognized as one of the pioneers of modern freediving education.

Martin was on hand during David Blaine's "Drowned Alive" stunt in Lincoln Center in May 2006. Blaine was attempting to hold his breath (known as "apnea") long enough to break the current world record of eight minutes, fifty-eight seconds.

Martin is the founder of Freediving Instructors International (F.I.I.) the largest freediving education agency in the United States. He is an advisory board member of DiveWise a non-profit organization dedicated to freediver education and safety and celebrity supporter of Oceana.

In May 2009, utilizing only his monofin for propulsion, Martin became the first man to dive over 400 feet (120 m) on a single breath of air.

== Official World Records by Martin Štěpánek ==
Apnea	Association	Record	Date	Location
FIM		110 m	23 May 2009	Sharm (Egypt)
CWT		122 m	22 May 2009	Sharm (Egypt)
FIM		108 m	5 April 2006	Cayman (BWI)
FIM		106 m	3 April 2006	Cayman (BWI)
CWT		106 m	1 April 2006	Cayman (BWI)
VWT		136 m	14 April 2005	Cayman (BWI)
CNF		80 m	9 April 2005	Cayman (BWI)
CWT		103 m	10 September 2004	Spetses (Greece)
FIM		102 m	3 Mars 2004	Cayman (BWI)
CWT		93 m	29 May 2003	Limassol (Cyprus)
FIM		90 m	8 September 2001	Miami (USA)
STA		8 min 6 sec	3 July 2001	Miami (USA)
STA		7 min 47 sec	1 July 2001	Miami (USA)
