= Petar Klovar =

Croatian freediver

Petar Klovar is a Croatian freediver. As of 2026, he holds world records in three disciplines: constant weight without fins (CNF), free immersion apnea (FIM), and constant weight bi-fins CWTB. He was world no. 2 in 2025 by the international ranking. He is a member of the "Ocean" diving club in Rijeka.

Since 2022, he is also an AIDA referee.

In 2023, Klovar and fellow freediver Vitomir Maričić were removed from the Vertical Blue competition after prohibited substances were found in their luggage. Klovar denied the allegations. In January 2024, CMAS found the two athletes to have violated its Code of Ethics and imposed six-month suspensions and €5,000 fines.

== Results ==
At the Depth Quest in Mabini in April 2026, Klovar set a record in the FIM, reaching a depth of 137 meters in approximately 4 minutes, which represents the absolute deepest dive in the history of the competition in all disciplines. After that, he also dived in the CWTB (with fins), where he set a new record with a depth of 128 meters.

== Awards ==
- 2nd in the international ranking in 2025 by the World Apnea – AIDA International
