= Richard Collett =

Cayman Islands freediver (born 1970)

Richard Collett (born in Jos, Nigeria in 1970) is a freediver and national record holder for the Cayman Islands in the sport of freediving. Collett started his training in apnea and freediving in August 2016 with the goal of being the first Caymanian to set and hold national records in all competitive freediving disciplines.

In May 2017 (14th to 21st), Performance Freediving International (PFI) held its annual Deja Blue 8 competition in Grand Cayman, Cayman Islands. The competition, billed as the 'Iron Man' of freediving, brings international athletes to compete in all six AIDA International freediving disciplines, typically with multiple events being held on the same day i.e. depth and pool.

A total of 8 national records were initially set by Collett during Deja Blue 8 with at least one in each of the six freediving disciplines. Collett became the first Caymanian to set and hold international AIDA (National Association for the Development of Apnea) records in each discipline.

Collett has since gone on to set a total of 18 national records for the Cayman Islands in freediving and is the first Caymanian to dive deeper than 200 ft in competition.
