= Walk for Lika, Walk for Croatia =

- Protesting crowd on ban Jelačić Square in Zagreb
- Date: 5 September 2026; 11:00
- Location: Zagreb and Dubrovnik, Croatia; 45.8131°N 15.9772°E
- Caused by: Illegal toxic waste dumping; institutional corruption; collapse of Parliamentary Committee for Environmental Protection and Nature Conservation session in Gospić
- Goals: Immediate cleanup and environmental monitoring of illegal waste sites; amendment of environmental protection laws; prohibition of waste imports
- Methods: demonstrations; chanting

Number
around 10 000 people in Zagreb; around 50 people in Dubrovnik	

Walk for Lika, Walk for Croatia, was a massive environmental and anti-corruption protest held in Zagreb, Croatia, on 5 September 2026, triggered by a major illegal disposal of toxic waste in the Lika region.

== Background ==
=== Illegal Waste Disposal ===
In August 2026, Croatia's Office for the Suppression of Corruption and Organized Crime (USKOK) launched a major investigation into a widespread illegal waste dumping scheme involving companies managed by entrepreneurs Josip and Monika Šincek. The network illegally imported approximately 35,000 tons of hazardous, toxic, and medical waste from Italy, Slovenia and Croatia through around 1,750 shipments since 2023. The waste was brought to locations across the Lika region, including Gospić, as well as sites near Varaždin and Benkovac, where it was ground up, mixed with gravel, and buried underground or blended into construction materials to undercut processing costs.

The scheme involved a network of associates, including Jerko Kostelac, an environmental advisor for Lika-Senj County who issued waste management permits. The affair escalated into a high-level political scandal when Josip Šincek claimed during his defense that former Chief State Inspector and member of ruling Croatian Democratic Union Andrija Mikulić requested a €500,000 bribe to turn a blind eye on Šincek's illegal operations, alleging that permits were revoked only after the money was not paid.

=== Environmental and Public Health Concerns ===
In August 2026, environmental testing near the illegal waste site in Gospić revealed the presence of per- and polyfluoroalkyl substances (PFAS), commonly known as "forever chemicals" due to their extreme resistance to environmental degradation. Analysis showed total PFAS concentrations of 200.5 ng/L in groundwater downstream from the dump site, compared to undetected levels upstream, indicating active leaching from the buried waste into the local karst landscape. Public health authorities and the Croatian Institute of Public Health (HZJZ) clarified that the contamination was localized to groundwater directly adjacent to the site and had not affected the public tap water supply from the local Mrđenovac spring. However, independent experts and environmental scientists warned that the highly porous karst terrain could facilitate the rapid spread of mobile PFAS compounds through subterranean water channels, prompting calls for long-term monitoring and immediate site remediation.

=== Environmental Activism ===
The civic initiative "Gospić je naš dom" (Gospić is Our Home) was formed in August 2026 by local residents, environmental activists, and concerned citizens in response to the discovery of illegal toxic waste dumping near Gospić. The initiative sought to hold municipal and national authorities accountable for regulatory oversight failures, demanding immediate environmental remediation, continuous public water and soil testing, and criminal prosecution of those involved. Between August and early September 2026, the initiative organized a series of approximately ten local demonstrations and public gatherings in Gospić. These local actions ranged from peaceful marches through the town center and rallies in front of the Lika-Senj County administration building to informational stand-ins aimed at educating the public about the risks of karst groundwater contamination.

== Parliamentary and Institutional Response ==
On 17 August 2026, the Parliamentary Committee for Environmental Protection and Nature Conservation convened an extraordinary session in Gospić, chaired by Dušica Radojčić (Možemo!). Attended by top government officials - including Environment Minister Marija Vučković, Health Minister Irena Hrstić, Justice Minister Damir Habijan, and State Attorney General Ivan Turudić - the session degenerated into chaos just 40 minutes after starting. The dispute arose over procedural rules when the parliamentary majority restricted members of the civic initiative "Gospić je naš dom" from directly questioning ministers or entering debates like MPs. In response, all nine civic representatives walked out, declaring the hearing a "political farce" and announcing plans for national demonstrations in Zagreb. They were followed by members of opposition parties - including SDP, Možemo!, Most, and MP Dalija Orešković - who accused the governing HDZ of "trolling" the session and prioritizing procedural loopholes over public health. Opposition leaders condemned the government's handling of the crisis, comparing the illegal waste network to state-sanctioned organized crime. MP Dalija Orešković characterized the environmental contamination as "treason" against local communities and called for snap national elections and mass protests, while Gospić Mayor Darko Milinović dramatically discarded official environmental forensic evaluation documents into a trash bin outside the venue, criticizing their inadequacy. Following the walkout, committee chair Radojčić formally suspended the session. Following the collapse of the parliamentary committee session in Gospić, the "Gospić je naš dom" initiative announced a major national demonstration in Zagreb scheduled for 5 September 2026, under the slogan "Niste nas čuli, sad ćete nas vidjeti" (You didn't hear us, now you will see us).

=== Support and Public Endorsements ===
In the days leading up to the main demonstration in Zagreb, more than 200 prominent scientists, academics, legal experts, and public figures from art and culture endorsed the protest. The demonstration also received widespread support from major Croatian trade union confederations and sector-specific unions, including the Union of Autonomous Trade Unions of Croatia (SSSH), Independent Croatian Trade Unions (NHS), the Matrix of Croatian Trade Unions (MHS), the Police Officers' Union (Sindikat policijskih službenika), the Croatian Journalists' Union (SNH), and education unions such as the Teachers' Union of Croatia. However, as the mobilization for the protest gained momentum, the protest also faced political attacks from several political figures and pro-government commentators who attempted to spread the narrative that the protest in anti-Croatian or pro-Yugoslav. For example, Igor Štimac publicly criticized the event by calling it "anti-Croatian", claiming that the demonstration was organized by left-wing political parties. Similar narrative was also spread by MP Igor Peternel, psychiatrist Herman Vukušić and journalist Velimir Bujanec. The social and political friction surrounding the protest extended to public figures who endorsed the cause. Croatian writer and Lika native Damir Karakaš allegedly received numerous death threats, harsh verbal abuse, and defamatory accusations on social media after publicly inviting citizens to join the rally.

== The Protests ==
=== Zagreb ===
The protest took place on 5 September 2026. The protesters marched from King Tomislav Square to Ban Jelačić Square. Demonstrators carried placards with slogans such as "Lika is not a landfill!", "Ecocide equals slow genocide" and "Halt waste import".

Speakers at the rally sharply criticized government agencies for systemic negligence and allowing the illegal dumping of over 37,000 tons of hazardous waste in Gospić. The initiative issued a formal ultimatum to the Croatian government, demanding the presentation of a full site remediation plan within 20 days and the complete removal of the buried toxic waste within three months. The event mostly concluded peacefully with exception of an incident caused by a group of right-wing protesters led by Zadar city councilor Mate Lukić who allegedly shouted: "Miči se, došla je desnica, gazi ih sve odreda" ("Move, the right wing has arrived, crush them all") as well as insults such as "Hodaj naprid, komunjaro!" ("Keep walking, commie!")

=== Dubrovnik ===
Simultaneously with the central demonstration in Zagreb, a local solidarity rally titled "Hodaj za Liku uz Omblu" ("Walk for Lika Along the Ombla") took place in Dubrovnik. Around fifty local citizens led by Katarina Šilje, gathered near the Franciscan monastery in Rožat, adjacent to the Ombla river. Participants highlighted that high travel costs and long travel times by bus or plane prevented many residents from southern Dalmatia from reaching Zagreb. Demonstrators expressed solidarity with Lika while drawing attention to local ecological threats to the Ombla river basin, stating that protection of clean air, soil, and drinking water is a fundamental duty across all regions of Croatia.

== Evaluation ==
Sociologist Kruno Kardov, an associate professor at the Faculty of Humanities and Social Sciences in Zagreb, evaluated that the demonstration successfully united citizens across diverse political backgrounds by bridging local environmental concerns with nationwide systemic dissatisfaction. In an analytical commentary, political scientist Višeslav Raos argued that the protest highlighted a systemic flaw in Croatian governance, demonstrating that state institutions rarely respond to early local warnings until issue-based discontent reaches a critical mass in the capital.
