= Tom Sietas =

German freediver and record holder

Tom Sietas (born 12 January 1977 in Hamburg, Germany) is a German freediver. He specializes in the static apnea event, holding his breath under water, and the dynamic apnea event, swimming the greatest possible distance underwater without breathing. Sietas started free diving in the year 2000. Since then, he has set many world records and won many titles, including taking the world record from American extreme performer David Blaine about four and a half months after Blaine's much-publicised achievement in mid-2008. Sietas went on to add over five minutes to that record, which stood at 22:22 minutes when it was broken by Goran Čolak.

== History of records ==
- 05/30/12: World record static apnea on pure oxygen – 22:22min (Changsha, China)
- 12/30/08: World record static apnea on pure oxygen – 17:28min (Barcelona, Spain)
- 09/19/08: World record static apnea on pure oxygen – 17:19min (New York, USA)
- 07/02/08: World record in dynamic apnea without fins: 213m (Hamburg, Germany)
- 06/07/08: World record in static apnea – 10:12min (Athens, Greece)
- 05/12/08: World record in static apnea – 9:16min (Mainz, Germany)
- 02/22/08: World record static apnea on pure oxygen – 16:14min (Madrid, Spain)
- 11/27/07: World record static apnea on pure oxygen – 15:16min (Peking, China)
- 08/09/07: World record static apnea on pure oxygen – 15:02min (New York, USA)
- 05/01/07: World record in static apnea – 9:08min (Hamburg, Germany)
- 08/30/06: World record static apnea – 9:00min (Tokyo, Japan)
- 08/29/06: World record in dynamic apnea – 223m (Tokyo, Japan)
- 12/30/06: Best freediver 2006 – ICARE Trophies 2006
- 08/27/06: World record in dynamic apnea without fins – 183m (Tokyo, Japan)
- 08/13/06: World record in dynamic apnea without fins – 182m (Hamburg, Germany)
- 03/15/06: World record in dynamic apnea without fins – 180m (Tokyo, Japan)
- 03/04/06: World record in dynamic apnea without fins – 176m (Maribor, Slovenia)
- 12/21/05: Best freediver 2005 – ICARE Trophies 2005
- 08/25/05: World champion in dynamic apnea (Renens, Switzerland)
- 07/10/05: World record in dynamic apnea – 212m (Loutraki, Greece)
- 07/10/05: World record in dynamic apnea without fins – 175m (Loutraki, Greece)
- 12/19/04: German record (unofficial world record) in dynamic apnea – 215m (Hamburg, Germany)
- 12/18/04: German record (unofficial world record) in dyn. apnea without fins – 175m (Hamburg, Germany)
- 12/12/04: World record in static apnea – 8:58min (Eindhoven, Netherlands)
- 11/20/04: German record in dynamic apnea – 186m (Berlin, Germany)
- 10/30/04: German record (unofficial world record) in static apnea – 8:56min (Wiesbaden, Germany)
- 08/12/04: World Champion in Constant Weight and Static Apnea (Vancouver, Canada)
- 08/12/04: German record in dynamic apnea – 180m (Vancouver, Canada)
- 08/08/04: German record in constant weight – 70m (Vancouver, Canada)
- 06/11/04: World record in static apnea – 8:47min (Hamburg, Germany)
- 06/10/04: World record in static apnea – 8:27min (Hamburg, Germany)
- 06/09/04: World record in static apnea – 8:12min (Hamburg, Germany)
- 05/09/04: German record in constant weight – 67m (Nice, France)
- 02/21/04: German record in static apnea: 7:48min (Berlin, Germany)
- 09/06/03: German champion in constant weight and static apnea (Dellach, Austria)

== Personal bests ==
Discipline		Result	Accreditation
Time	STA	10:12min	
Time	STA O2	22:22min	Guinness
Distance	DNF	213m	AIDA
Distance	DYN	223m	AIDA
Depth	CWT	70m	AIDA

== See also ==
- Static Apnea
- David Blaine
