= Lovorka Čoralić =

Croatian historian (1968–2026)

Lovorka Čoralić (8 February 1968 – 14 March 2026) was a Croatian historian.

== Life and career ==
Čoralić was born in Zagreb on 8 February 1968. She graduated in history in 1990 at the Faculty of Philosophy of the University of Zagreb. In 1995, she received her master's degree at the same faculty with the subject Roads in medieval Croatian lands. She defended her doctoral dissertation entitled "Croats in Venice" in 1998 at the Faculty of Philosophy in Zadar.

She began her scientific career as an assistant at the Department of Croatian History of the Faculty of Philosophy in Zagreb (1992–1997). Since 1997, she has been employed at the Croatian Institute of History, where in 2011 she obtained the title of permanent scientific advisor.

As an external associate-lecturer, she held courses on the history of Venice and Italy at the Catholic Faculty of Theology and Croatian Studies in Zagreb. She also collaborated in teaching and scientific research at the University of Primorska in Koper. During her career, she was a mentor to numerous historians.

Her book In the city of Saint Mark: the history of the Croatian community in Venice (2001), based on her doctoral dissertation, is considered one of her key works.

Čoralić died on 14 March 2026, at the age of 58.
