= NATO forces in Poland =

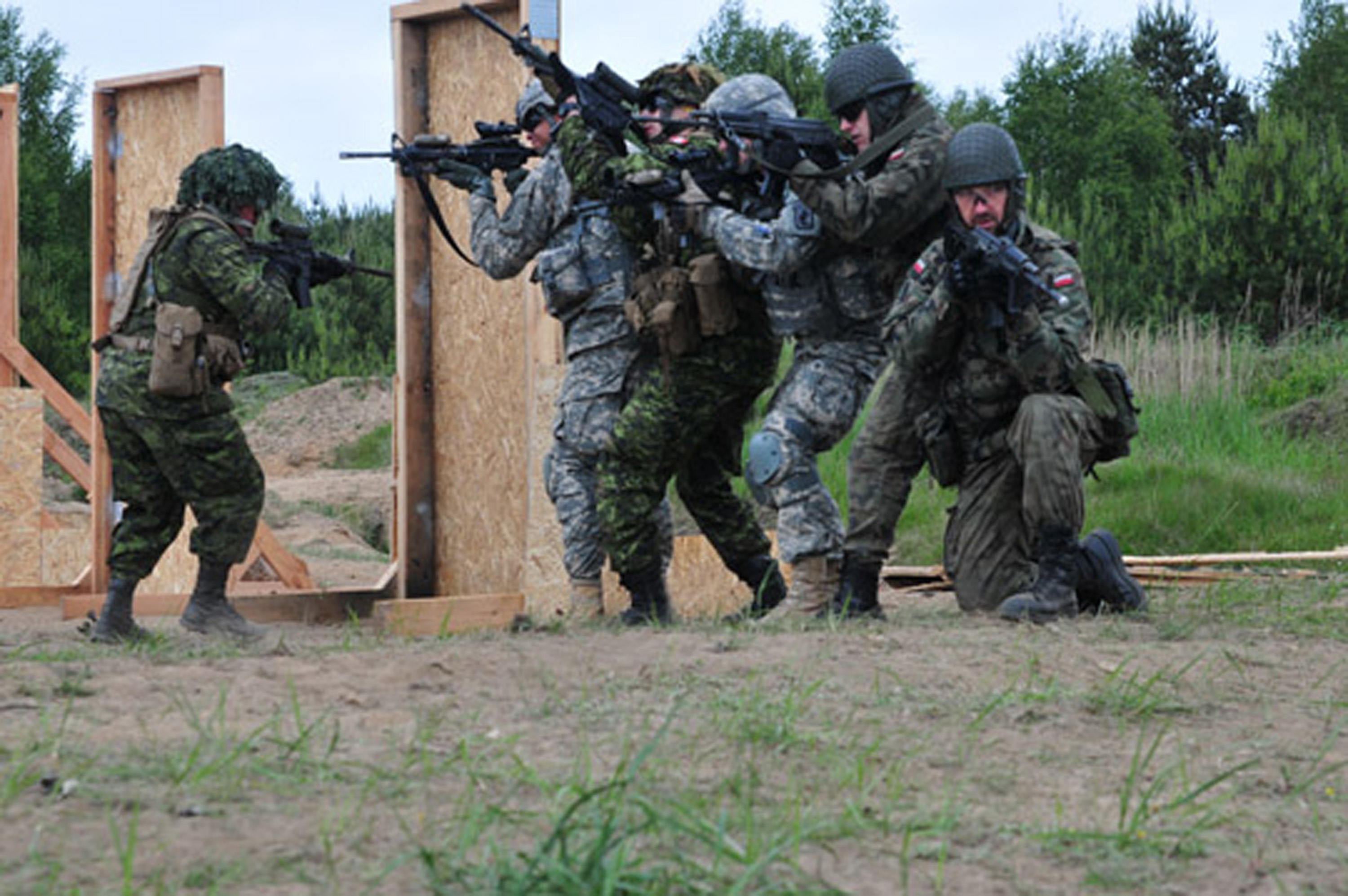
NATO paratroopers undergo international training in Poland in 2014.

NATO forces in Poland consist of both Polish and allied units. Poland joined NATO in 1999.

Polish forces include:

- MNC NE (Multinational Corps Northeast in Szczecin) – created in 1999,
- JFTC (Joint Force Training Centre NATO in Bydgoszcz) – created in 2004,
- 3NSB (3rd NATO Signal Battalion (3 Batalion Łączności NATO) w Bydgoszczy) – created in 2010,
- MP COE (NATO Military Police Centre of Excellence (Centrum Eksperckie Policji Wojskowej NATO) in Bydgoszcz) – created in 2013,
- NFIU (NATO Force Integration Unit (Jednostka Integracji Sił NATO) in Bydgoszcz) – created in 2015,
- CI COE (Counter Intelligence Center of Excellence (Centrum Eksperckie Kontrwywiadu NATO) in Kraków) – created in 2017.

The first NATO allied units arrived in Poland in 2017. (Previously, allied units were not stationed on Polish territory, although they did take part in military exercises, such as Anaconda, Dragon or Noble Jump exercises in the mid-2010s; such exercises are still taking place, e.g. Defender Europe in 2020). They include:

- MND NE (Multinational Division North East in Elbląg) – from 2017. It consists of soldiers from: Poland, the Czech Republic, Estonia, Spain, Canada, Lithuania, Latvia, Germany, Romania, Turkey, the United States, Hungary, the United Kingdom and Slovakia.
- eHP units (NATO Forward Presence)

In 2019, the size of allied units in Poland was estimated at around 5,000.

The size of the NATO units in Poland occasionally fluctuates when NATO training exercises are held on Polish soil.

NATO in presence in Poland has been temporarily increased during the 2021–2022 Russo-Ukrainian crisis.

== See also ==
- Northern Group of Forces
