= Aleix Segura =

Freediver from Barcelona

Aleix Segura i Vendrell (born 28 November 1986, Barcelona) is a Spanish multiple World Champion freediver both under AIDA and CMAS official structures. Through spearfishing he developed his apnea skills and started competing in apnea (freediving) in 2011, reaching in competition during his debut year breath holds over eight minutes, and over ten minutes in the following seasons so far, achieving three World Champion titles in static apnea until now. He competes in both swimming pool and depth disciplines in the sea but is currently specialized in static apnea, which aims to hold the breath underwater for the longest time.

In 2016 he achieved also the official Guinness World Record for "Longest time breath held voluntarily underwater (male)" in static apnea with previous pure oxygen breathe up, reaching 24 minutes and 3.45 seconds in an event broadcast on TV, during the Mediterranean Dive Show 2016, becoming the longest official breath hold ever. He is the only person ever to have simultaneously held the AIDA, CMAS, and Guinness World Record static apnea titles.

He currently combines his freediving career with his professional activity as an architect in Barcelona.

== Early life ==
He was born in 1986 in Barcelona. As a child he learned to freedive in the sea during his family vacations in Costa Brava, the northern coast of Catalonia. He practiced several sports prior to competitively develop his aquatic skills, football, taekwondo, judo and basketball until high school. Simultaneously he started spearfishing which became the reason for him to further develop his apnea capacity, leading later on to the competitive purpose in 2011, after finishing his Architecture studies in the Universitat Politècnica de Catalunya, which is his current job combined with his freediving career.

== Titles ==
- 2011 – Vice World Champion CMAS in static apnea, Tenerife, Spain
- 2012 – Vice European Champion CMAS in static apnea, Antalya, Turkey
- 2013 – Vice World Champion CMAS in static apnea, Kazan, Russia
- 2015 – World Champion AIDA in static apnea, Belgrade, Serbia
- 2015 – World Champion CMAS in static apnea, Mulhouse, France
- 2016 – Guinness World Record in O2 static apnea, Cornellà, Barcelona, Spain
- 2016 – World Champion AIDA in static apnea, Turku, Finland
- 2017 – Vice European Champion CMAS in static apnea, Cagliari, Italy
