= 2023 in Croatia =

- Decades: 2000s; 2010s; 2020s
- See also: Other events of 2023; Timeline of Croatian history

Events in the year 2023 in Croatia.

== Incumbents ==
- President: Zoran Milanović
- Prime Minister: Andrej Plenković

== Events ==
=== January ===
- 1 January – Croatia adopted the euro and became the 20th member state of the eurozone. This was the first enlargement of the monetary union since Lithuania's entry in 2015. Croatia also joined the Schengen Area and became its 27th member. This was the first enlargement of the Schengen Area since Liechtenstein's entry in 2011.

== Deaths ==
=== January ===
- 1 January – Ferdinand Zovko, bariton and university professor (b. 1943).
- 2 January
  - Zvonimir Iveković, athlete (b. 1935).
  - Ivka Dabetić, actress (b. 1936).
- 3 January – Mirko Zelić, academic and scientist (b. 1936).
- 5 January – Željko Kućan, academic and biochemist (b. 1934).
- 8 January – Martin Semenčić, sound designer and film editor (b. 1980).
- 10 January – Fabijan Lovrić, poet (b. 1953).
- 16 January – Miro Glavurtić, painter, writer and mystic (b. 1932).
