= Static apnea =

Stationary diving discipline of holding breath underwater

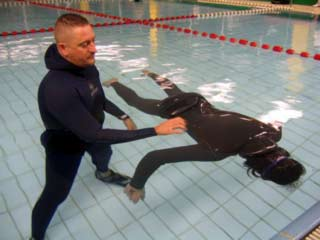
A diver performing static apnea face down in a pool, with the support of a partner (left)

Static apnea (STA) is a discipline in which a person holds their breath (apnea) underwater for as long as possible, and need not swim any distance. Static apnea is defined by the International Association for Development of Apnea (AIDA International) and is distinguished from the Guinness World Record for breath holding underwater, which allows the use of oxygen in preparation. It requires that the respiratory tract be immersed, with the body either in the water or at the surface, and may be performed in a pool or open water (sea, lake, river, etc.). Static apnea is the only AIDA International discipline measuring duration, and one of the three disciplines considered for the international competitions by team, with constant weight and dynamic with fins.

Beta blockers (doping in sport of freediving; prolong every type of apnea by reducing heart rate, blood pressure and cardiac output) can prolong static apnea for up to 20%.

== All-time list ==
=== Men ===
Duration	Name	Date	Location	Accreditation
11:35	Stéphane Mifsud	8 June 2009	La Crau, France	AIDA
10:45	Branko Petrović	11 November 2017	Subotica, Serbia	CMAS
10:31	Florian Dagoury	13 March 2020	Koh Tao, Thailand	AIDA
10:12	Tom Sietas	7 June 2008	Athens, Greece	
10:07	Aleix Segura	19 June 2015	Belgrade, Serbia	AIDA
10:03.96	Mateusz Malina	26 March 2018	Dubai, United Arab Emirates	12th Fazza competition
09:58.66	Goran Čolak **	16 June 2017	Cagliari, Italy	CMAS

* Branko Petrović also has 11:54 under World Guiness (2014, Dubai, UAE). He never reduplicated this performance under the level of anti-doping scrutiny required by official freediving federations such as CMAS and AIDA.

** Goran Čolak also has 11:06.14 and 10:19 under special rules at 12th and 11th Fazza freediving competition respectively, in Dubai, UAE.

=== Women ===
Duration	Name	Date	Location	Accreditation
09:07	Heike Schwerdtner	27 June 2024	Kaunas, Lithuania	AIDA
09:02	Natalia Molchanova	21 June 2013	Belgrade, Serbia	AIDA
08:53	Veronika Dittes	15 June 2017		CMAS
08:33	Gabriela Grézlová	28 July 2015	Mulhouse, France	CMAS
08:01	Jessea Lu	27 August 2016		AIDA

== With pure oxygen – record progression ==
There is a variation of the static apnea discipline where it is possible to breathe 100% oxygen for up to 30 minutes prior to the breathhold. This is not part of formal competitions, but is occasionally used to set individual records.

Duration (minutes)	Name	Date	Location	Accreditation
29:03	Vitomir Maričić	14 June 2025	Opatija, Croatia	Guinness
24:37	Budimir Šobat	27 March 2021	Sisak, Croatia	Guinness
24:03	Aleix Segura	28 February 2016	Barcelona, Spain	Guinness
23:09	Aleix Segura	16 February 2016	Barcelona, Spain	Guinness
23:01	Goran Čolak	20 June 2014	Vir, Croatia	Guinness
22:30	Goran Čolak	29 September 2013	Zagreb, Croatia	Guinness
22:22	Tom Sietas	30 May 2012	Changsha, China	Guinness
22:00	Stig Severinsen	3 May 2012	London, United Kingdom	
21:33	Peter Colat	17 September 2011	Ebikon, Switzerland	Guinness
20:21	Ricardo Bahia	16 September 2010	Rio de Janeiro, Brazil	Guinness
20:10	Stig Severinsen	1 April 2010	Kattegatcentret, Denmark	Guinness
19:21	Peter Colat	14 Feb 2010	St. Gallen, Switzerland	Guinness
19:02	Nicola Putignano	21 May 2009	Milan, Italy	Guinness
18:32	Karol Meyer	10 July 2009	Florianópolis, Brasil	Guinness
18:03	Gianluca Genoni	26 November 2008	Goito, Italy	
17:19	Tom Sietas	19 September 2008	New York City, United States	Guinness
17:04	David Blaine	30 April 2008	Chicago, United States	Guinness
16:32	Peter Colat	10 February 2008	St. Gallen, Switzerland	AIDA
16:13	Tom Sietas	23 February 2008	Madrid, Spain	Guinness
16:04	Peter Colat	10 February 2007	St. Gallen, Switzerland	AIDA
14:12	Tom Sietas	5 January 2006	Milan, Italy	Guinness
13:05	Bill Strömberg	3 October 2004	Lausanne, Switzerland	AIDA
12:47	Giancarlo Bellingrath	15 June 2003	Naples, Italy	
12:34	Gianluca Genoni	11 May 2002	Busto Arsizio, Italy	

== See also ==
- Shallow water blackout
- Freediving
