= Zagreb school stabbing =

Mass stabbing in Croatia

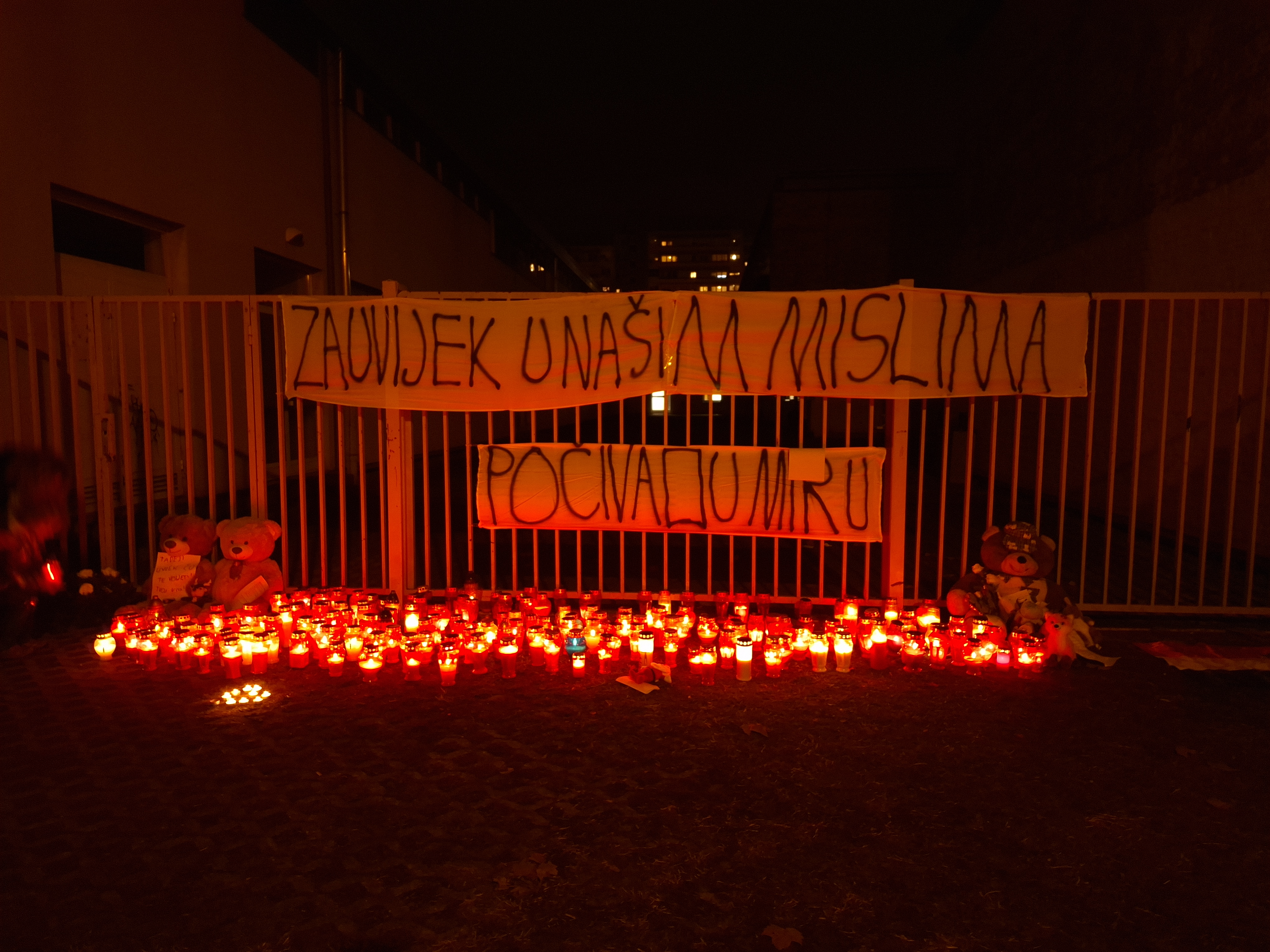
- Banner on a gate at the back of the school, with the inscription: "Zauvijek u našim mislima. Počivao u miru." (translated to English: "Forever in our thoughts. Rest in peace.").
- Location: 45.7942818°N 15.9043259°E; Prečko Elementary School, Dekanići 6, Prečko, Zagreb, Croatia
- Date: 20 December 2024 c. 9:50 a.m. (CET, UTC+01:00)
- Target: Students and staff
- Attack type: Mass stabbing, attempted murder-suicide, pedicide
- Weapon: Knife
- Deaths: 1
- Injuries: 7 (including the perpetrator)
- Perpetrator: Leonardo Mušančić
- Motive: Unknown
- Charges: Murder; Attempted murder

On 20 December 2024, a mass stabbing occurred at Prečko Elementary School in Zagreb, Croatia. 19-year-old Leonardo Mušančić stabbed seven people, resulting in the death of a 7-year-old student. Six others, five students and a teacher, also sustained injuries.

== Background ==
The Prečko Elementary school, situated in the neighbourhood of Prečko in Zagreb is home to around 13,765 residents.

The attack marked the first school attack in Croatia since 2006, when 19-year-old Mihovil Vukšić killed 18-year-old Branimir Mateljak in front of the school yard in Gradec, Zagreb County by stabbing him eight times in the head and throat.

== Attack ==
The attacker, dressed in black and with a balaclava on his head, entered Prečko Elementary School at about 9:50 a.m., physically assaulting a student in the corridor before storming a random class with a knife, killing a seven-year-old student and wounding five more students and a teacher in the process. The 62-year-old teacher allegedly attempted to protect the kids from the attacker, before getting stabbed 31 times by the attacker. According to the mother of one of the pupils present in the classroom during the attack, the kids reacted by hiding under the tables, before eventually getting up and running away in different directions. Some of the kids were found in the school kitchen, some on the school exit, while she found her daughter in a restaurant across the street. The perpetrator escaped from the scene to a nearby health centre.

While hiding in a toilet at the health centre, the attacker attempted suicide using the knife. The police detained him about ten minutes after receiving a distress signal. He was subsequently transported to a hospital for treatment of his self-inflicted wounds. Meanwhile, a helicopter ambulance landed in the schoolyard and six ambulances rushed to the scene, transporting the wounded to various hospitals around Zagreb.

== Investigation ==
Several hours after the attack, Croatian Minister of the Interior Davor Božinović held a press conference. Božinović stated that the motive of the attack remains unknown, but that the perpetrator had a history of mental health issues. The police later stated that the attacker would be charged with one count of aggravated murder and four counts of attempted aggravated murder. A psychiatric examination concluded that the attacker is mentally fit for a criminal charge. He was then taken to the police station in Heinzelova street in Zagreb, where he remained silent during questioning. He was then detained and transferred to Remetinec prison. The police stated that the attacker will be charged with a total of 45 criminal offenses, including 40 counts of children's rights violations.

== Perpetrator ==
The perpetrator, Leonardo Mušančić (born c. 2005), was a 19-year-old at the time of the attack, was a former student at the school who had suffered from multiple severe mental health issues, such as borderline personality disorder and two other undisclosed disorders; he also attempted to commit suicide in 2023. His mother told 24sata that he was taken to a psychiatric institution for a treatment on the day of the attack, and that she did not know when or how he ended up going to Prečko Elementary School. The mother also added that she was afraid of her son due to his behaviour and that, one month prior to the attack he held her and his grandmother hostage in their own apartment by taking their phones and keys.

Croatian media site RTL reported that the attacker was "obsessed" with knives and sabres, which he purchased on the internet. On one of his reviews in April 2024 on a site that specialized in selling knives and similar sharp objects, he added that one of the knives "weren't sharp enough". Mušančić was also found out to have obsessed over the Sandy Hook Elementary School shooting.

== Legal proceedings ==
The trial started on 24 September 2025 and concluded approximately three months later. In first instance verdict announced on 23 December the perpetrator, now 20, received 50 years in prison, which is the maximum prison sentence provided under Croatian law.

== Reactions ==
=== Domestic ===
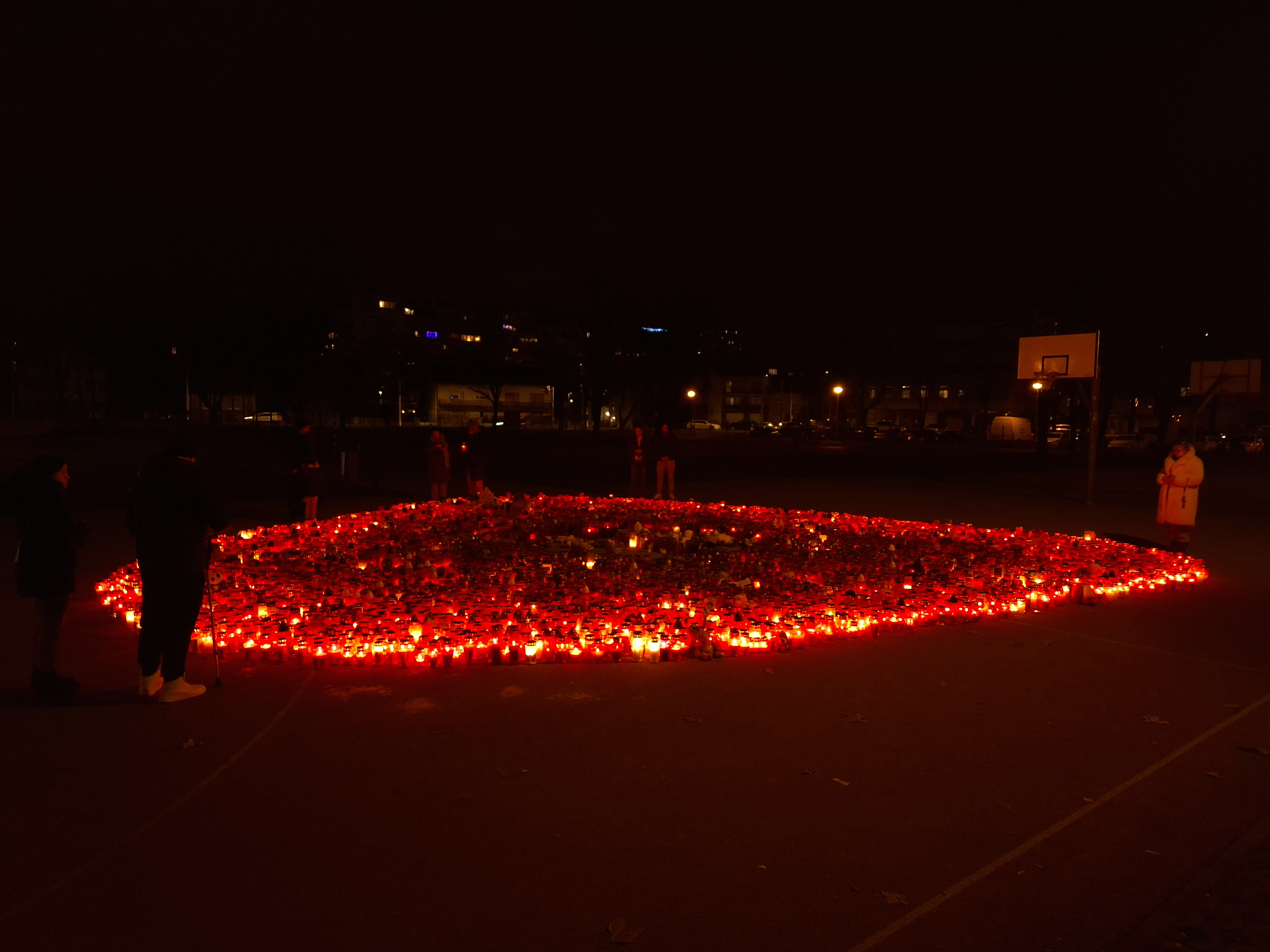
The largest of several vigils for the victim on the school courtyard. Lanterns were placed around the center of the basketball court, with teddy bears and other plush toys in the center.

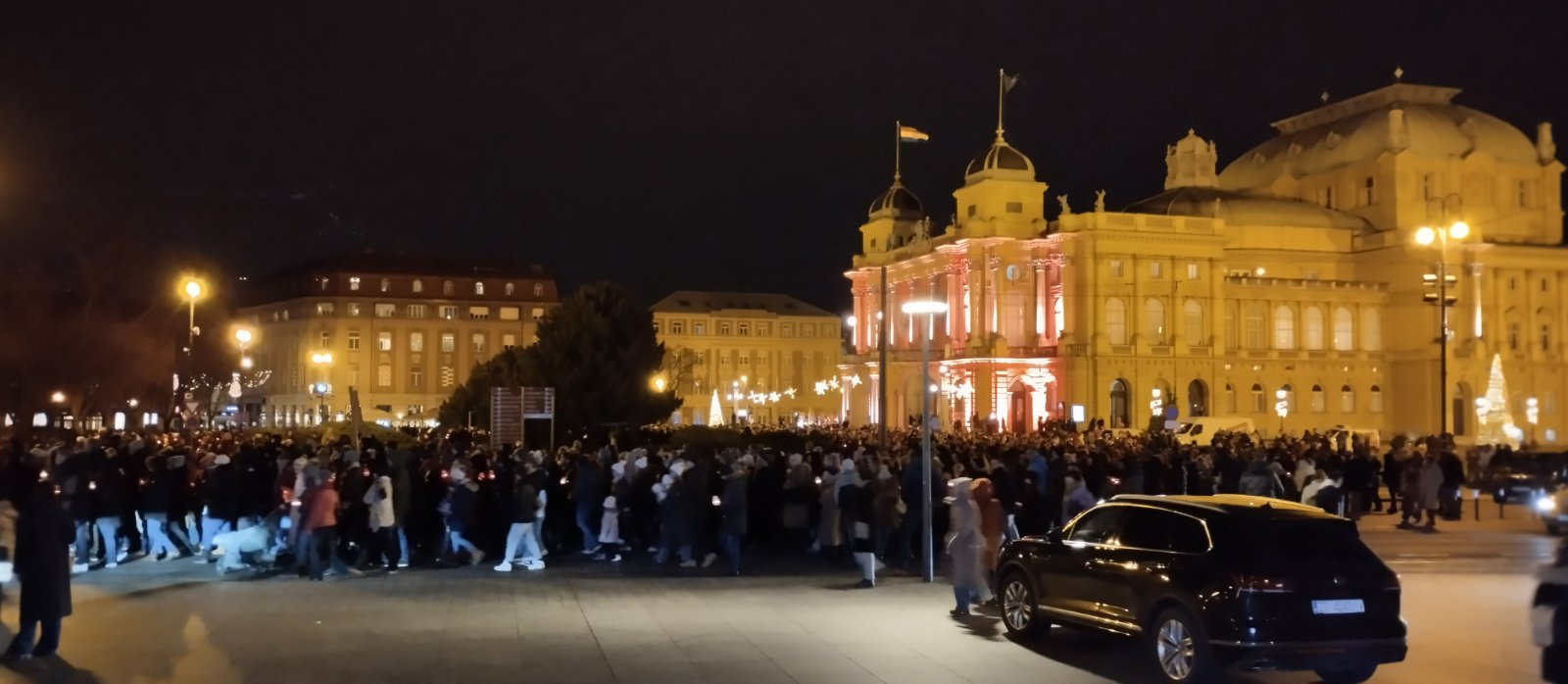
A procession organized by The Croatian Teachers' Union in the aftermath of Prečko massacre, brought thousands of Zagreb citizens to the street. Similar processions were also organized in other Croatian towns such as Rijeka or Osijek.

On the day of the attack, Croatian Ministry of Health announced that they dispatched the inspection to the institution where the attacker was treated. The Government proclaimed the following day, 21 December 2024, a national day of mourning. Later on the day of the attack, Mayor of Zagreb Tomislav Tomašević and Prime Minister Andrej Plenković came out with a list of precautions that will be taken in all Croatian schools moving forward in order to prevent another attack from occurring. The measures are to take effect as soon as the schools reopen following the winter break. The City of Zagreb also provided contact information for psychological assistance, support, and counseling services available to all citizens without the need for a referral.

Citizens of Zagreb assembled in front of the school throughout the day to light candles and lay down toys and messages in honor of the victim.

The president of the Croatian Teachers' Union called for the government to bring a national plan for protection and prevention against violence in schools, which was reportedly in the works at one point, but was never finalized. The Croatian Teachers' Union, the Rebirth Union and the Independent Union of Croatian Highschool Employees held a procession on 23 December under the name "Za sigurnu školu" (For a safe school).

=== International ===
President of Serbia Aleksandar Vučić expressed his condolences to the families of those injured in the attack on behalf of himself and all of Serbia. A vigil was organized by the parents of the children killed in the 2023 school shooting in Belgrade, and held on 21 December on the Republic Square in Belgrade. During the anti-government protests in Niš on 22 December, the protestors held sixteen minutes of silence – fifteen minutes for the fifteen victims of the Novi Sad railway station canopy collapse and an additional one for the killed Zagreb student.

The Government of Montenegro declared 23 December a national day of mourning in the country following the attack. US Ambassador to Croatia Nathalie Rayes also expressed her condolences.

== See also ==
- List of attacks related to primary schools
- List of national days of mourning (2020–present)
