= Vitomir Maričić =

Croatian freediver

Vitomir Maričić (born in Rijeka, 5 January 1985) is a Croatian freediver. He was World no. 1 in the 2025 by the international ranking. He holds national records in five disciplines. He is member of the "Ocean" diving club in Rijeka. During his career, he won 49 Gold medals, 16 Silver medals and 8 Bronze medals (Status as November 2026).

== Education and life ==
He was born in Croatia’s principal seaport and the third-largest city Rijeka in 1985. He attended elementary schools in Rijeka (Eugen Kumičić, Turnić, Kozala, Brajda) and gymnasium in Sušak. Maričić earned bachelor's degrees in informatics (University of Rijeka) and kinesiology (University of Zagreb). He is an AIDA (International Association for the Development of Apnea) referee since 2019. He is president of AIDA's Croatian branch.

In the Guinness Book of Records, Vitomir Maričić was achieved by the longest time breath, held voluntarily underwater with 29 minutes and 3 seconds in Opatija, Croatia, on 14 June 2025. This record is about five minutes longer than the previous world record, set in 2021 by another Croatian freediver, Budimir Šobat.

== Results ==
At the "Depth Quest" competition in Mabini (Philippines) in April 2026, Maričić won first place overall.

== Awards ==
- No. 1 in the international ranking by the World Apnea: 2025
