= Constant weight without fins =

Freediving discipline

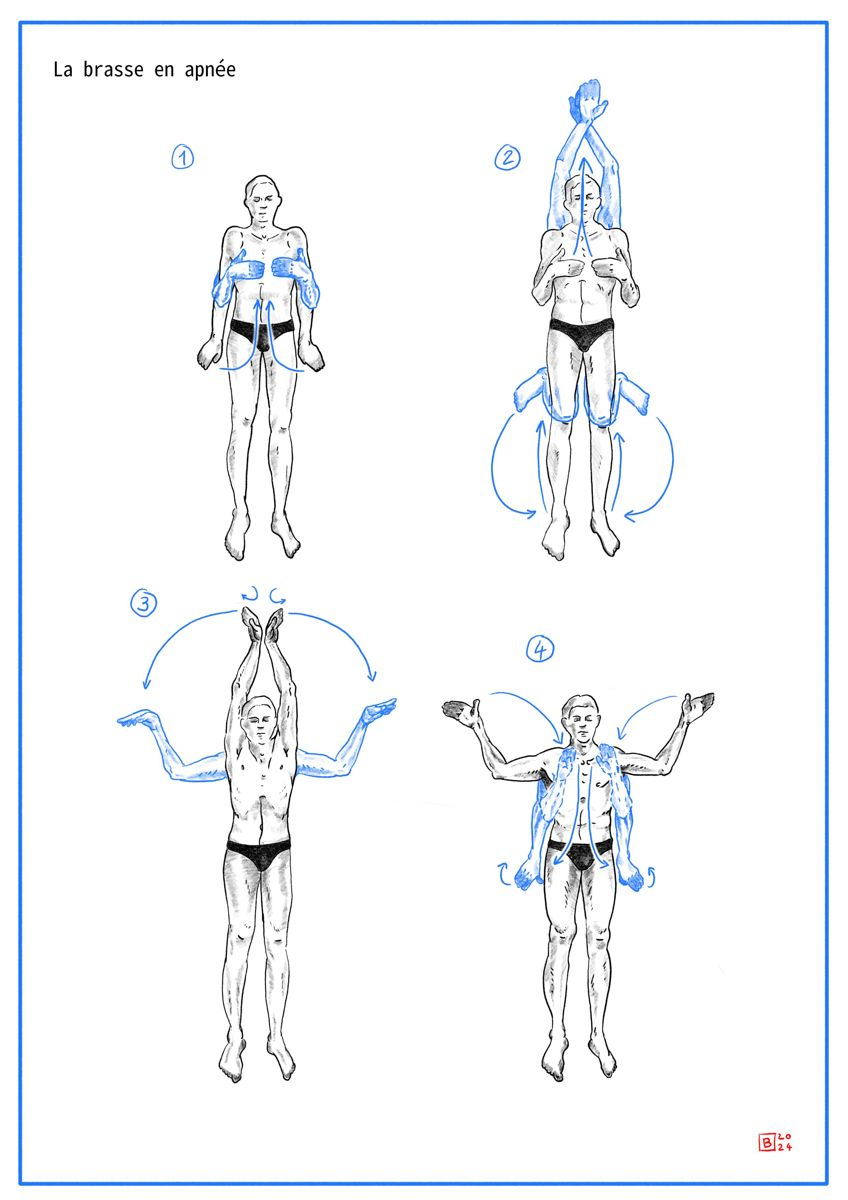
The freediving breaststroke technique used for CNF dives

Constant weight without fins (CNF) is an AIDA International (International Association for Development of Apnea) freediving discipline in which the freediver descends and ascends by swimming without the use of fins or without pulling on the rope or changing his or her ballast; only a single hold of the rope to stop the descent and to start the ascent is allowed. Constant weight without fins is the depth discipline of freediving that is most challenging, because of the physical effort needed to swim without assistance.

== Challenges ==
The main differences between free diving disciplines that involve diving to depth and those that occur at the surface are: the dive cannot be interrupted, there are periods where work is performed and the diver is impacted by direct effects of pressure.

== Current record holders ==
- Women: Kateryna Sadurska (Ukraine) – 80 metres on October 7, 2024
- Men: Petar Klovar (Croatia) – 103 metres on May 26, 2025
