= Remembrance Day (Croatia) =

National holiday in Croatia

Remembrance day
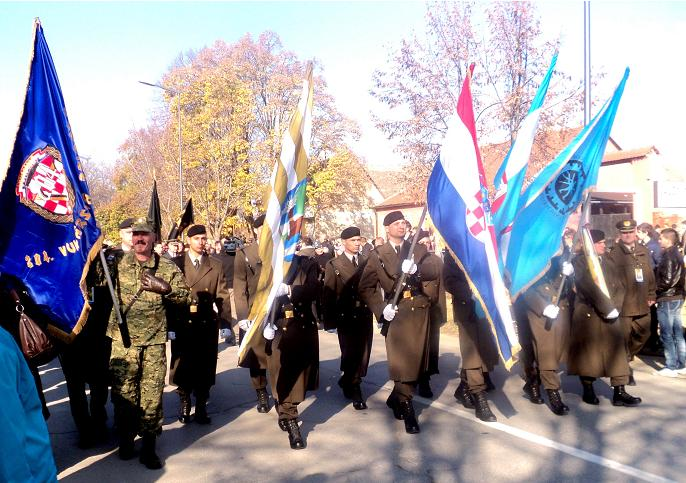
- Observed by: Croatia
- Significance: Vukovar massacre
- Date: 18 November
- Next time: 18 November 2027
- Frequency: annual

Remembrance Day (Croatian: Dan sjećanja) or Day of Remembrance for the Victims of the Homeland War and Day of Remembrance for the Victims of Vukovar and Škabrnja (Croatian: Dan sjećanja na žrtve Domovinskog rata i Dan sjećanja na žrtvu Vukovara i Škabrnje) is a national public holiday in the Republic of Croatia and a non-working day in memory of all victims of the Homeland War in Croatia. The holiday is celebrated on November 18, the day of the fall of the city of Vukovar in the 1991 Homeland War, when the Yugoslav People's Army and Serbian paramilitaries committed the two most massive crimes in Croatia during the Croatian War of Independence in two Croatian towns, Vukovar and Škabrnja. These events are known as theVukovar massacre and the Škabrnja massacre. In memory of these events, the Croatian Parliament in 2019 has adopted a new law which introduced a new holiday, a day of remembrance for all victims of the Croatian War of Independence.

== History ==
=== Fall of Vukovar ===
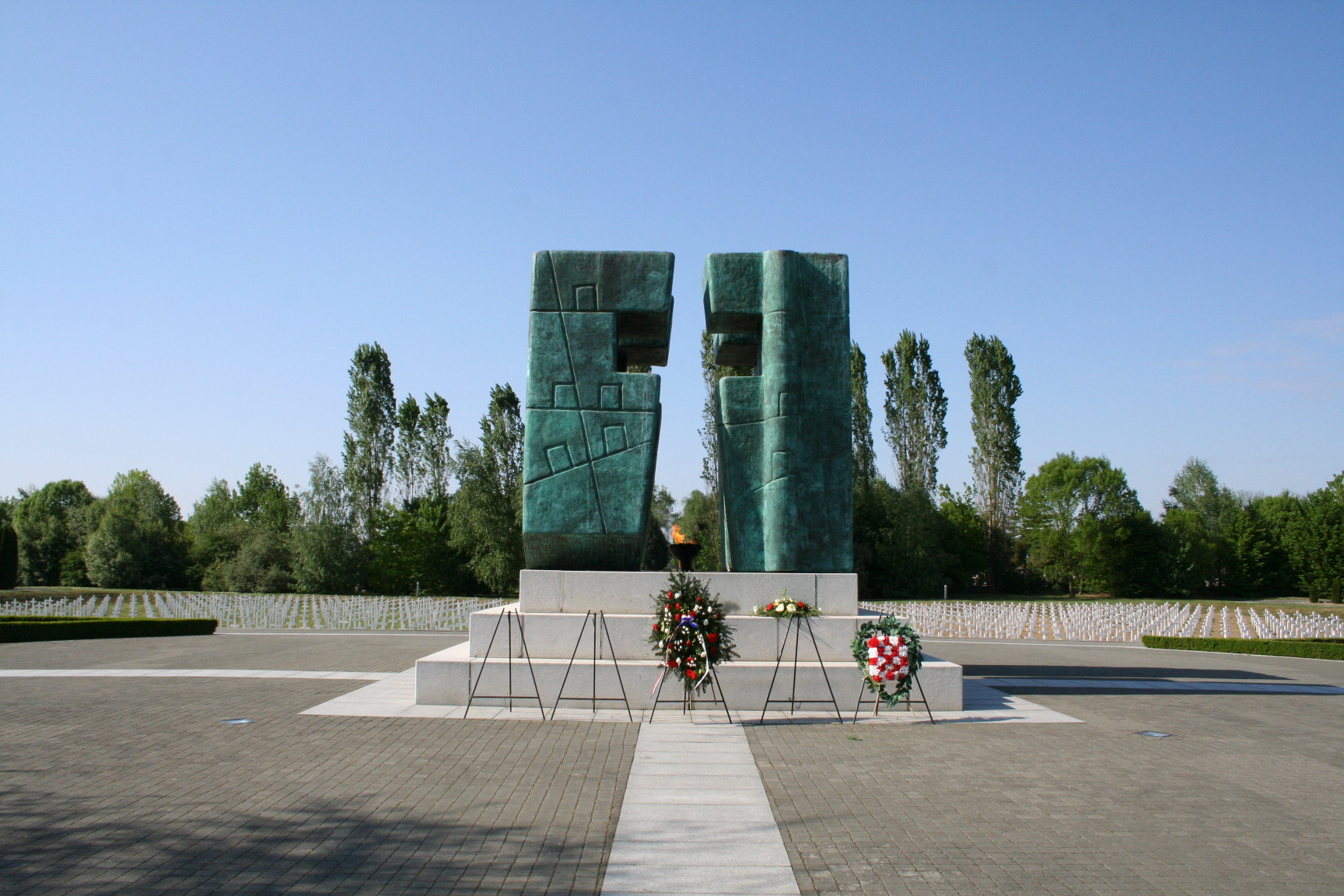
Bronze monument at the Memorial Cemetery for Homeland War Victims in Vukovar.

During the Croatian War of Independence, the Yugoslav People's Army and Serb paramilitaries besieged and shelled the city of Vukovar from mid-August to the end of November 1991. Vukovar was bombed for 87 days, attacked from the ground, and shelled day and night from the direction across the Danube from the territory of (Vojvodina) Serbia. Fighting between the Yugoslav People's Army and poorly armed Croatian troops lasted exactly 87 days. The first bombed targets in the city were cultural institutions, such as the city museum in Eltz Manor and the Vukovar Hospital, which was shelled daily with thousands of missiles. After months of siege and the demolition and destruction of a city such as Europe has not seen since World War II, the city was finally occupied on November 18, 1991. Over 85% of the buildings in the city were completely unusable, whithe city was without food, water and basic necessities.

After the fall of the city, many of its inhabitants and defenders of the city found refuge in the Vukovar Hospital, which operated in very difficult conditions. After the fall of the city, paramilitaries and the Yugoslav People's Army took over the hospital, and many who took refuge in the hospital were listed and taken to execution sites.

More than 3,000 civilians were killed during the battle of Vukovar, and many non-Serbs were expelled from Vukovar after the fall of the city, while several hundred non-Serbs were killed at the nearby Ovčara farm near Vukovar and elsewhere, such as the warehouse hangars of the Velepromet.

=== Historical significance of the Battle for Vukovar ===
The fall of Vukovar changed the picture of the war in the international public, this changed the minds of many who continued to advocate for the survival of Yugoslavia in the west, even though the war was already going on for a long time. Although, the battle for Vukovar was lost, the few defenders of the city fought for almost three months and allowed the Croatian leaders to better equip the army and prepare the army to defend the country. Today it is believed that this event helped the recognition of Croatian independence.

Although it conquered the city, for the Yugoslav People's Army and the Serbian paramilitary, this was a Pyrrhic victory because they ultimately suffered heavy human losses and a large number of weapons and war equipment were destroyed.

Symbolically, Croatian War of Independence definitely ended in the place where it started, in the eastern Croatian, Danube Region and Vukovar. On January 15, 1998, the peaceful reintegration of the Croatian Danube region, Vukovar and the entire occupied territory of eastern Croatia were finally returned to the constitutional and legal order of Croatia.

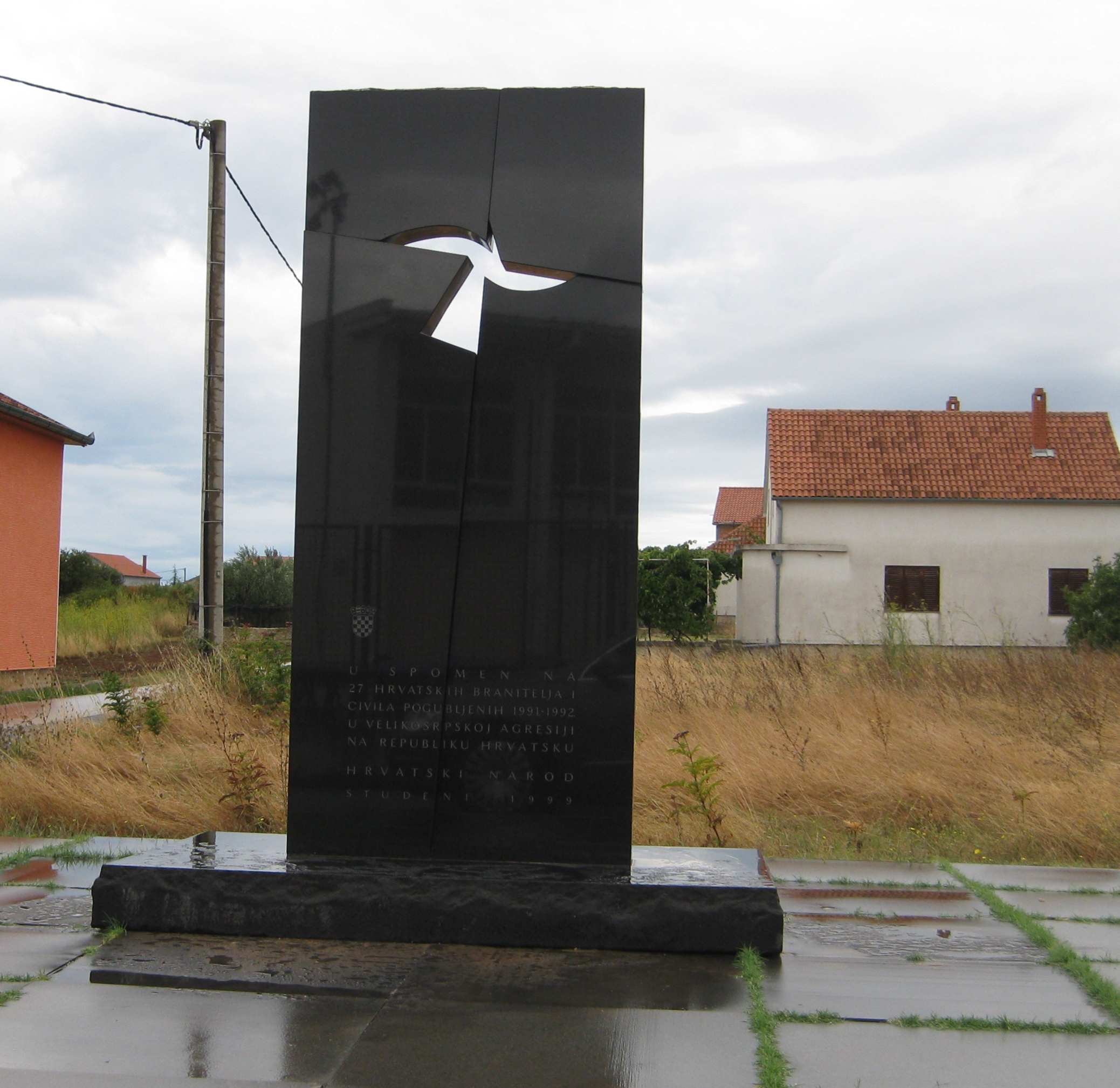
Škabrnja Memorial.

=== Škabrnja massacre ===
From November 18 to 19, 1991, during the Croatian War of Independence, a crime took place in two villages near the city of Zadar, Nadin and Škabrnja, killing 62 civilians and 5 prisoners of war committed by Yugoslav People's Army and paramilitary units of the self-proclaimed Serbian Autonomous Oblast of Krajina.

== Commemoration ==
In memory of the suffering of all civilians in the Croatian War of Independence, the Croatian Parliament declared November 18, 1991, a day of remembrance for all victims of the war in Croatia.

Every year on that day in Vukovar and Škabrnja are held the most massive gatherings called 'Column of Remembrance' when people from all over Croatia but also the regional countries and the Croatian diaspora as well as Croatian politicians and foreign visitors coming in that day in the city of Vukovar in eastern Croatia, and Škabrnja, near Zadar in Dalmatia to pay tribute to all the victims of the Homeland war in Croatia. Around 150,000 people participated in remembrance procession in Vukovar on 2023 Remembrance Day.

== 30th anniversary of the fall of Vukovar ==
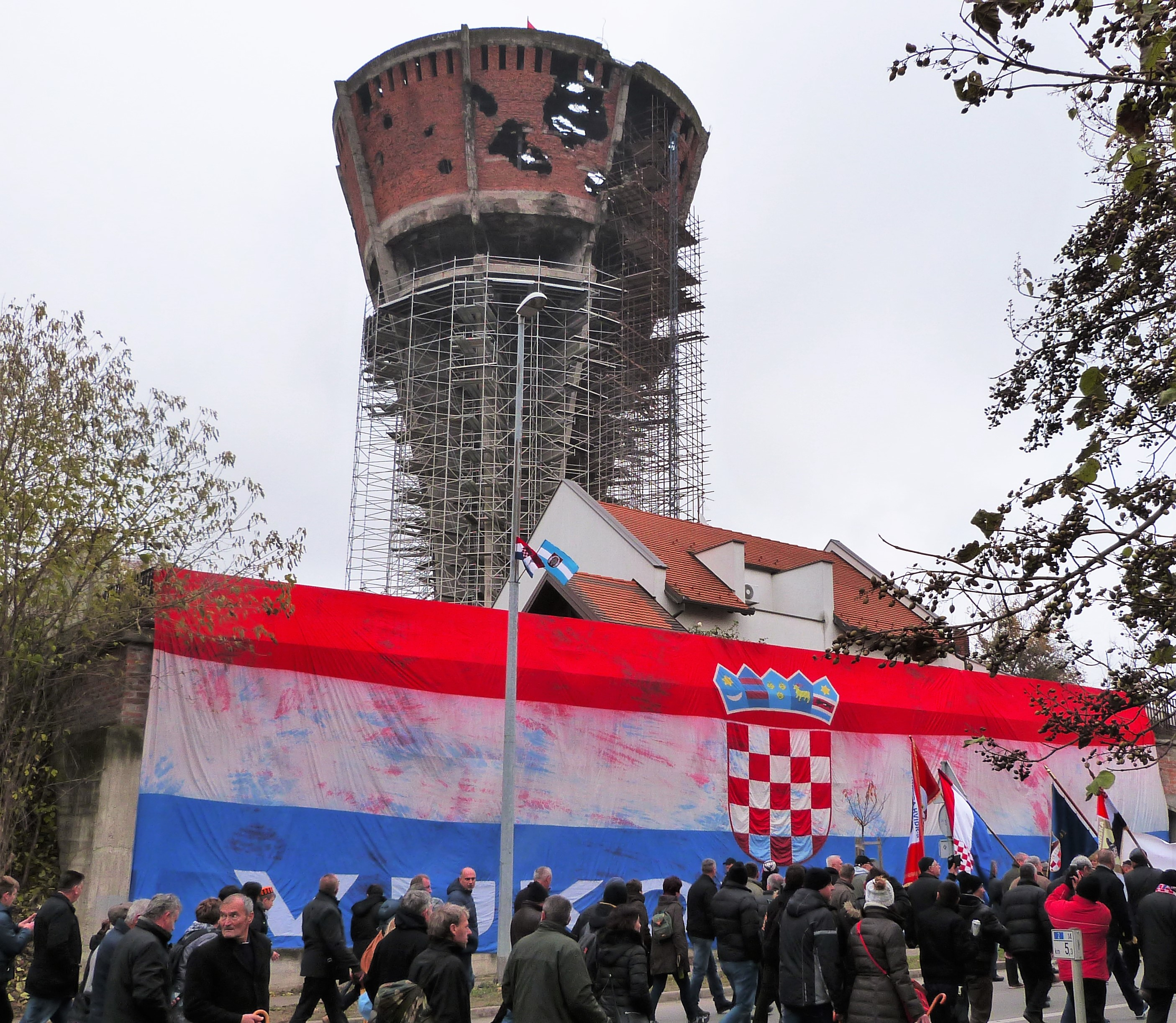
'Column of Remembrance' 2017, near Vukovar water tower, a war symbol of the city of Vukovar and memorial museum.

November 18, 2021, marked the thirtieth anniversary of the fall of Vukovar with the participation of tens of thousands of people from Croatia and abroad. With the participation of the President of Croatia Zoran Milanović and the Prime Minister Andrej Plenković and numerous other delegates from the public and political life of Croatia. Also member of the Presidency of Bosnia and Herzegovina Šefik Džeferović attended the commemorative event. Representatives of the Serb community in the Republic of Croatia, led by Croatian Deputy Prime Minister Boris Milošević, also attended the commemoration. Holy Mass at the central cemetery in Vukovar with the participation of several bishops and priests was served by Đuro Hranić, Archbishop of Roman Catholic Archdiocese of Đakovo-Osijek.

== See also ==
- Public holidays in Croatia
- Vukovar massacre
- Remembrance Day around the world
