= No-limits apnea =

Freediving discipline

No Limit apnea is a discipline of competitive freediving, also known as competitive apnea, in which the freediver descends and ascends with the method of his choice. Often, a heavy metal bar or "sled" grasped by the diver descends fixed to a line, reaching great depths. The most common ascension assistance is via a solid or inflatable lifting device, which allow for rapid surfacing. The dives may be performed head-first or feet-first. The freediving organization AIDA was the first to name this discipline No Limit (NLT) and to document world records in it.

This form of diving is considered extremely dangerous by diving professionals. No Limit has claimed the lives of several divers. As of 2025 the discipline is no longer recognized by either AIDA or CMAS.

== Challenges ==
The three main differences between free diving disciplines that involve diving to depth and those that occur at the surface are that you cannot interrupt the dive, there are periods where work is performed and the diver is impacted by direct effects of pressure.

== Records ==
The current No Limit world record holder is Herbert Nitsch with a depth of 214 metres (702 ft) set on 9 June 2007, in Spetses, Greece, however, in a subsequent dive on 6 June 2012 in Santorini, Greece to break his own record, he went down to 253.2 metres (831 ft), a Guinness World Record, but suffered severe decompression sickness afterwards.

== See also ==
- Competitive apnea – Underwater diving without breathing apparatus
