= Dynamic apnea =

Freediving disciplines where the diver swims horizontally under water

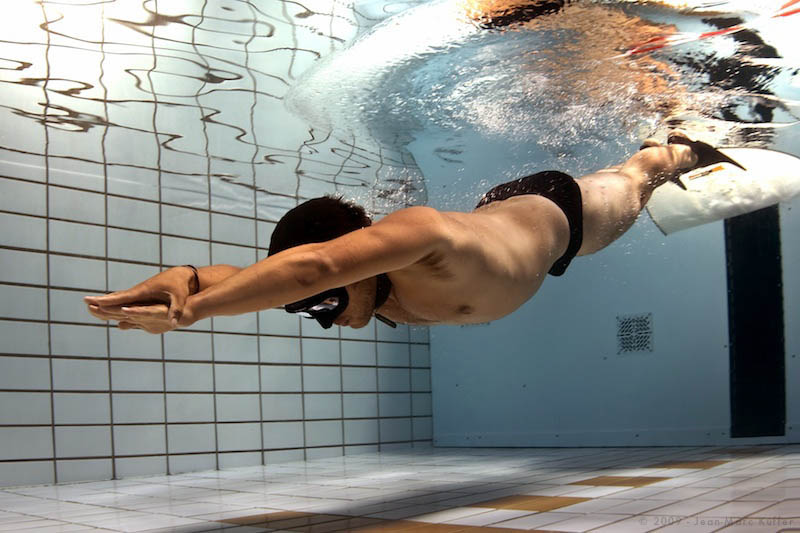
Monofin freediver doing a breath-hold and swimming underwater

Dynamic apnea is a discipline in competitive freediving in which athletes swim horizontally underwater on a single breath, aiming to cover the greatest possible distance. Performances take place in swimming pools and are governed by organizations such as AIDA International and the Confédération Mondiale des Activités Subaquatiques (CMAS).

== Disciplines ==
Dynamic apnea includes three competitive disciplines recognized under both AIDA and CMAS rules:

- Dynamic apnea without fins (DNF) – the athlete swims using a modified breaststroke technique without fins.
- Dynamic apnea with fins (DYN) – the athlete uses a monofin or similar fin setup.
- Dynamic apnea with bifins (DYNB or DYN BF) – the athlete uses a pair of standard fins.

These disciplines are distinct from other competitive freediving categories, which include: Static apnea (STA), No-limits apnea (NLT), Variable weight apnea (VWT), Free immersion (FIM), Constant weight apnea (CWT), Constant weight without fins (CNF), and constant weight bi-fins (CWTB).

== Rules and Judging ==
All dynamic apnea events are performed in a horizontal position on a single breath-hold, without propulsion assistance from any static surface - except during turns, where pushing off the pool wall is allowed. Valid performances must take place in certified swimming pools at least 25 metres in length, with both the start and end of the dive occurring within the pool. Performances are measured by the horizontal distance swum underwater.

To validate an attempt, the diver must resurface and complete the surface protocol, which includes removing facial equipment and giving an "OK" sign within 15 seconds of surfacing. The purpose of this protocol is to demonstrate that the athlete is conscious and in full control at the end of the dive. Disqualification may result from failure to complete the protocol, loss of motor control, or blackout.

Both AIDA and CMAS have specific regulations for equipment, pool dimensions, and judging criteria.

In DNF, athletes often prefer 25-metre pools to maximize the use of wall push-offs. In contrast, for DYN and DYNB, longer 50-metre pools are favored to reduce the number of turns and maintain continuous finning rhythm.

== Physiology ==
During dynamic apnea, freedivers often exhibit a significant reduction in heart rate (bradycardia), sometimes dropping by 30–50% to conserve oxygen. This response, part of the mammalian dive reflex, slows the heart and redirects blood flow to vital organs, allowing them to extend their time underwater and better achieve long underwater distances.

== Training ==
Apnea training helps freedivers and breath-hold athletes increase how long they can hold their breath safely and comfortably. It focuses on key areas that includes breath-hold capacity, efficiency, technique, mental control, proper breathing and safety. Training is done both in water and on land (dry training).

=== Dry training ===
Common training methods include structured training exercises, called "static apnea tables" to help athletes adapt to:

High CO_{2} levels (carbon dioxide): This builds tolerance to the discomfort and urge to breathe.

Low O_{2} levels (oxygen): This helps increase how long they can safely hold their breath.

These are typically practiced out of the water (dryland) to build breath control and delay the onset of involuntary breathing contractions. These tables are usually done lying or sitting down in a relaxed place. They train your breathing control and delay the uncomfortable muscle contractions that signal the need to breathe. CO_{2} tables make one more comfortable with the urge to breathe by shortening rest times between holds and building tolerance to high carbon dioxide. While O_{2} tables help your body get used to low oxygen levels by slowly increasing how long you hold your breath.

Another dry exercise is the apnea walk where one hold their breath while walking on land, like a beach or grassy field. They begin with relaxed breathing for 2–3 minutes, then take a deep breath and hold. Once their body starts contracting (a tightening feeling in the chest), they stand up and walk at a normal pace, holding their breath the whole time. When they can't hold their breath anymore, they will stop and breathe normally, and then measure how far they walked and try to improve each time.

Apnea walks works by building more CO_{2} than sitting still, so this helps increase one's tolerance. It also teaches one's mind how to handle discomfort both safely and calmly. For safety reasons, it is important to do apnea walks with a buddy and in a safe place (soft ground like grass and no hard surfaces, no traffic) to avoid injury in case of an accidental blackout.

=== In-water training ===
In-water training emphasizes relaxation, streamlined body position, and efficient propulsion techniques to minimize oxygen consumption. Repetitive dynamic apnea swims, interval training, and technique drills are used to increase underwater distance capabilities.

Common in-water exercises include:

Static apnea: Floating still with breath held to practice relaxation and extend hold time.

Dynamic apnea: Swimming underwater for distance using fins or without fins.

Technique drills: Practicing streamlined body position, turns, and gentle kicks to move efficiently.

In-water training also builds confidence and control under real conditions.

=== Mental Training ===
Relaxation techniques like progressive relaxation, meditation and visualization help reduce stress and heart rate. Controlled breathing techniques, such as diaphragmatic breathing, trains one to breathe deeply and efficiently using their belly, not their chest. This also plays a key role in preparing athletes for performance dives and aids in mental calmness, which is a crucial aspect during both training and actual dives.

=== Safety ===
Safety is a highly important element of apnea training. Divers are advised to always train with a buddy and to follow strict protocols like proper hydration to avoid blackouts or loss of motor control. They are also advised to never hyperventilate before a dive, and to follow recovery breathing techniques after each breath-hold. It is also important for one to know their limits and understand training is about slow and steady progress.

== Notable athletes ==
- Alexey Molchanov (Russia) – Multiple world record holder in dynamic and depth disciplines.
- Mateusz Malina (Poland) – Known for his world records in DNF and DYN.
- Magdalena Solich-Talanda (Poland) – Leading female athlete in pool disciplines.

== See also ==
- Freediving
- Apnea
- AIDA International
- CMAS
