= Free immersion apnea =

Human-powered freediving discipline

Free immersion (FIM) is an AIDA International freediving discipline in which the freediver dives under water without the use of propulsion equipment, but only by pulling on the rope during descent and ascent.

Performances may be done head first or feet first during the descent, or a combination of the two.

The current record holders are Alexey Molchanov (Russia) with a depth of 133 meters (433 feet) (AIDA rules), set on 22 July 2023 in Dean's Blue Hole at Vertical Blue 2023, Bahamas, Petar Klovar (Croatia) with a depth of 132m (433 feet) (CMAS rules), set on 6 October 2022 in Kaş, Antalya, Turkey, and among female freedivers Sayuri Kinoshita (Japan) with 97 meters (318 feet), set on 26 July 2018 in the Bahamas (CMAS rules), Fatima Korok (Hungary), set on 26 July 2023 in the Bahamas (102m, AIDA rules).
