= ZLIB-FM =

Radio station

ZNP-FM
- Clarence Town, Bahamas; Bahamas
- Broadcast area: Long Island, Bahamas
- Frequency: 106.1 MHz
- Branding: Island Breeze 106.1 FM

Programming
- Format: variety hits

History
- Call sign meaning: ZL (former ITU prefix under United Kingdom rule) Island Breeze

Technical information
- ERP: 1,000 watts
- HAAT: 25 meters (82 ft)
- Transmitter coordinates: 23°06′13″N 74°58′56″W

ZLIB-FM is a variety hits radio station in Clarence Town, Bahamas.
