= Vertical Blue =

Freediving competition in the Bahamas at Dean's Blue Hole

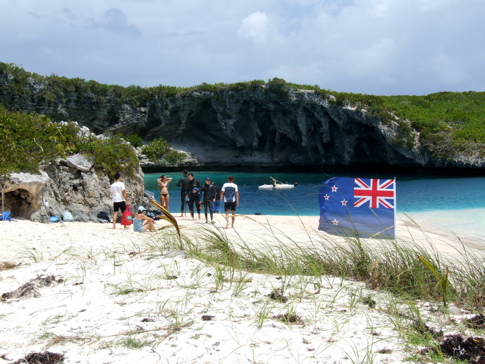
- Dean's Blue Hole during Vertical Blue 2008
- Genre: Sporting event
- Date: Mid-year
- Venue: Dean's Blue Hole
- Location: Long Island
- Coordinates: 23°6′23″N 75°0′31″W
- Country: The Bahamas
- Inaugurated: 2008
- Founder: William Trubridge
- Organiser: William Trubridge and AIDA International
- Sponsors: Suunto (2012-2017); Origin ECN (2018)

Vertical Blue is an invite-only elite freediving competition which has been held in the Bahamas at Dean's Blue Hole by freediving world record holder William Trubridge. It was an AIDA International or CMAS in 2021 judged competition and has been the venue for multiple world and national records for athletes coming from countries all over the world.

== Description ==
Vertical Blue is a depth competition which consists of the freediving depth disciplines of free immersion (FIM), Constant weight without fins (CNF) and Constant weight (CWT).

The event has been held at Dean's Blue Hole on Long Island in the Bahamas and was organized by William Trubridge with AIDA International providing judges.

== History ==
=== Vertical Blue 2008 ===
Vertical Blue 2008 was announced in February 2008 and was held from 1 to 11 April in the same year. It was attended by competitors from Brazil, Canada, Colombia, France, Japan, New Zealand, the Russian Federation, Switzerland and the United States. A total of 23 national and 3 world records were achieved.

=== Vertical Blue 2009 ===
Vertical Blue 2009 was held from 1 to 9 April 2009 and was attended by competitors from Austria, Australia, Brazil, Canada, Colombia, Denmark, France, Italy, Japan, New Zealand, Tunisia, the United Kingdom and the United States.

=== Vertical Blue 2013 ===
On November 17, 2013, American freediver Nicholas Mevoli died after attempting to set an American record during a Vertical Blue competition at Dean's Blue Hole.
