= Blue hole =

Marine cavern or sinkhole, open to the surface, in carbonate bedrock

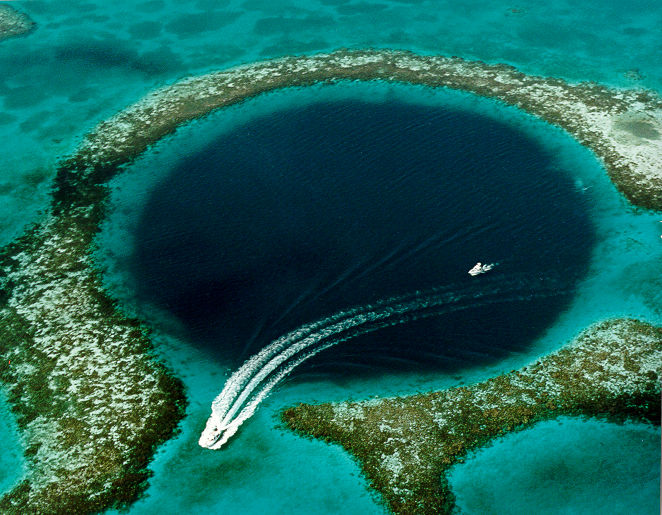
The Great Blue Hole, located near Lighthouse Reef, Belize

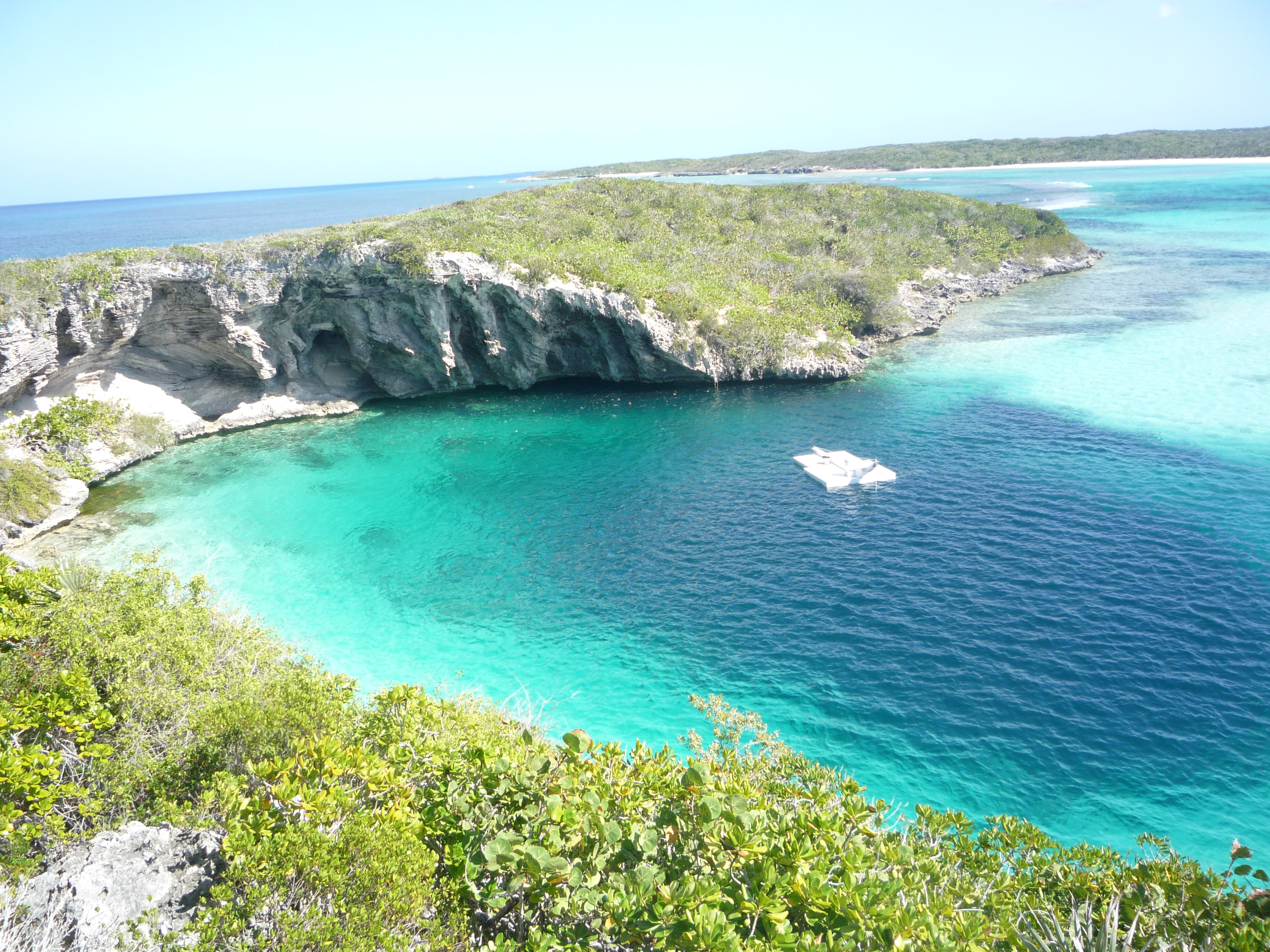
Dean's Blue Hole, Long Island, Bahamas

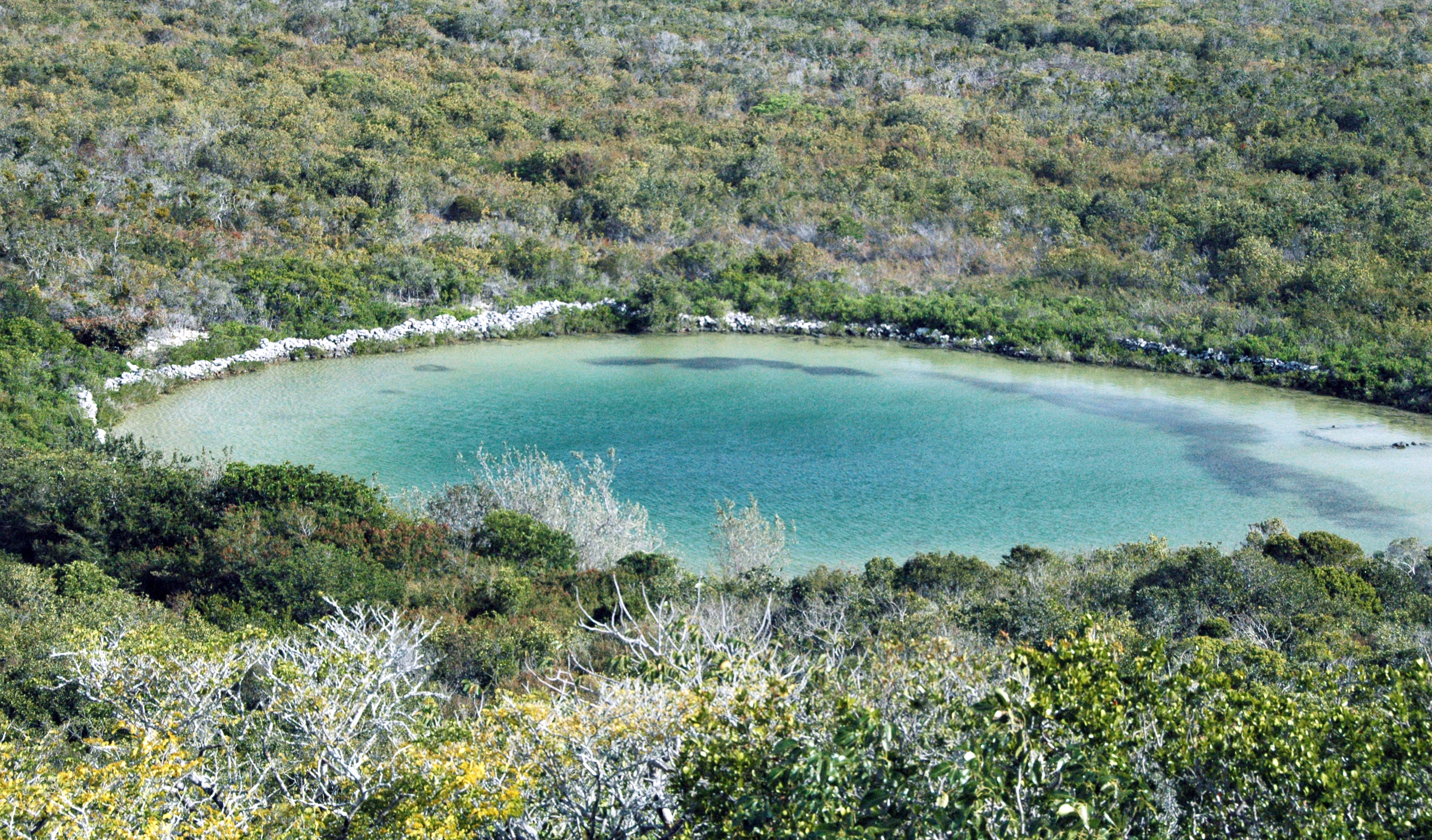
Watling's Blue Hole, San Salvador Island, Bahamas

A blue hole is a large marine cavern or sinkhole, which is open to the surface and has developed in a bank or island composed of a carbonate bedrock (limestone or coral reef). Blue holes typically contain tidally influenced water of fresh, marine, or mixed chemistry. They extend below sea level for most of their depth and may provide access to submerged cave passages. Well-known examples are the Blue Hole of Dahab in the Red Sea, Dragon Hole in the South China Sea and in the Caribbean: the Great Blue Hole and Dean's Blue Hole.

Blue holes are distinguished from cenotes in that the latter are inland voids usually containing fresh groundwater rather than seawater.

== Description ==
Blue holes are roughly circular, steep-walled depressions, and so named for the dramatic contrast between the dark blue, deep waters of their depths and the lighter blue of the shallows around them. Their water circulation is poor, and they are commonly anoxic below a certain depth; this environment is unfavorable for most sea life, but nonetheless can support large numbers of bacteria. The deep blue color is caused by the high transparency of water and bright white carbonate sand. Blue light is the most enduring part of the spectrum; other parts of the spectrum—red, yellow, and finally green—are absorbed during their path through water, but blue light manages to reach the white sand and return upon reflection.

The deepest blue hole in the world is the Taam Ja' Blue Hole in Chetumal Bay, off the Caribbean Sea, which was found to have a depth of more than 420 metres (1,380 ft) in 2024. The second deepest is the Dragon Hole, or Longdong, in the South China Sea at 300.89 metres (987 ft) deep, while the third deepest blue hole in the world is Dean's Blue Hole at 202 metres (663 ft), located in a bay west of Clarence Town on Long Island, Bahamas. Other blue holes are about half that depth at around 100–120 metres (330–390 ft). The diameter of the top entrance ranges typically from 25–35 metres (82–115 ft) (Dean's Blue Hole) to 300 metres (980 ft) (Great Blue Hole in Belize).

The overall largest blue hole (taking into account depth and width) is located 100 kilometers from the coast of Belize. The Great Blue Hole is a massive 300 meters wide and 125 meters deep.

== Formation ==
Blue holes formed during past ice ages, when the sea level was 100–120 metres (330–390 ft) lower than at present. During these times, the formations were exposed to the same erosion from rain and chemical weathering that is common to all limestone-rich terrains. The process ended once the sea level rose at the end of the ice age.

Most blue holes contain both freshwater and saltwater. The halocline is the boundary surface between the freshwater and the saltwater in these blue holes where a corrosive reaction takes place that eats away at the rock. Over time this can create side passages, or horizontal "arms", that extend from the vertical cave. These side passages can be quite long; e.g., over 600 metres (2,000 ft) in the case of the Sawmill Sink in the Bahamas.

Blue holes are formed through karst processes and require a specific type of topography. Rocks such as limestone, gypsum and marble are soluble and dissolution creates passages and cave systems underground. This process in combination with doline formation permits blue holes to be formed. Doline formations were once closed depressions formed by solution of superficial rock or subsidence collapse into an underground void.

Most blue holes are formed through these processes although some do not show any sign of passages or cave systems as would be normally expected from karst and doline processes. This suggests that some blue holes may be caused by other processes such as vertical reef development.

Some blue holes do not experience karst or doline processes during their formation. They form through bedrock dissolution and collapse, usually influenced by tidal forcing, carbonate dissolution, sea level fluctuations, or the presence of eogenetic carbonates.

== Occurrence ==
Blue holes are typically found on shallow carbonate platforms, exemplified by the Bahama Banks, as well as on and around the Yucatán Peninsula, such as at the Great Blue Hole at Lighthouse Reef Atoll, Belize.

Many deep spring basins formed by karst processes and located inland also are called blue holes, for example Blue Hole in Castalia, Ohio.

== Diversity ==
Many different fossils have been discovered that indicate the type of life forms that existed in blue holes. Other life forms such as marine life and marine fossils have also been noticed; crocodile and tortoise fossils, for instance, have been found in blue holes. Important types of bacterial colonies have also been found in blue holes. Due to the conditions of a blue hole, they are forced to live off sulfur compounds like hydrogen sulfide, which are toxic to most organisms. These special bacteria have produced many insights into the chemistry and biology of microbial life.

Blue holes have a great diversity of microbes, and they create biogeochemical pathways. In the surface layer, oxygen, DOC, POC and chlorophyll need to be in low levels in order for cyanobacteria to respire. As depth increases, many branches and sub branches of microbes create specific niches based on the chemistry and nutrient availability of that depth.

Microorganisms including foraminifera, meiobenthic, and nematodes also follow this pattern of organization, and inhabit the areas of the water column where the nutrients they rely on are most available. Nematodes, which are predominantly non-selective detrivores, are tolerable to the anoxic conditions at the base of blue holes, allowing them to survive where other species cannot. They thrive at the lowest depths of blue holes due to the abundance of organic matter that settles there. Similarly, foraminifera inhabit the lower depths, and even increase in diversity with depth. Meiobenthic organisms cannot survive the high sulfide found at depth, and remain in the surface layers of blue holes. Generally, the diversity of all forms of life is 2-3x greater in blue holes than other diverse areas of the ocean, including coastal and abyssal environments. When the diversity of microorganisms is larger, a proportional increase in larger organisms and their diversity is to be expected.

== Sedimentation ==
Sediment accumulation is particular in blue holes. Sedimentation occurs at the center of holes rather than the edges. Many different kinds of sediment help preserve fossils and climate records. The main sediments that build up and create layers in blue holes are sapropel, detrital peat, and lacustrine marls. Within these layers, microfossils can be found.

Sediment cores taken from three blue holes in the Bahamas showed that with depth, more sapropel, detrital and freshwater peat, and lacustrine marls were found. At about 150 cm of sediment core, microfossils of wood, Charophytes and Hydrobiidae were found.

== Chemistry ==
The chemistry of blue holes vary greatly depending on how they were formed. All blue holes have a layer of freshwater at the surface and more saline water as the depth increases. Many have pycnoclines and haloclines that show these zones, similar to the ocean around it. Many blue holes are great sediment traps and can preserve climate and fossil records dating back to the last glacial maximum. The reason blue holes are able to preserve such records is due to the anoxic bottom water most blue holes contain. Stable Hydrogen and Oxygen isotopes can be used to help identify where the water within blue holes comes from. Scientists have discovered that many have meteoric or marine sources of saline water within them. Being able to identify where the water comes from in these columns allows scientists to see how tidally influenced they are. Most blue holes have a range in salinity from fresh water to hypersaline. Conduits and passageways allow for brackish water to enter as well. When the same isotopes of major ions are found in blue holes and in the surrounding ocean, it can be concluded that these blue holes are tidally influenced and have a marine water source, however, if the isotopes are similar to those found in meteoric lenses, then the source is meteoric.

== Expeditions ==
Exploring blue holes requires a level of competence and equipment appropriate to the depth and overhead penetration. In 2009 a team of scientists set out to study seven of these blue holes in the Bahamas. Through over 150 dives, the scientists, led by Keith Tinker, investigated bacteria able to live in anoxic environments. This allowed them to make connections to fields such as astrobiology where organisms thrive without oxygen or sunlight.

In 2018, another group of scientists set out to explore the Great Blue Hole of Belize using two submarines of the latest technology. One of the major scientific contributions to result from this expedition was the first 3-dimensional map of its interior. The researchers captured features such as stalactites, the hydrogen sulfide layer, and other details that cannot usually be seen by the naked human eye.

As part of a three-year study, a group of scientists set out in May and September 2019 to explore a blue hole nicknamed the "Amberjack Hole" located 30 miles off the coast of Sarasota, Florida. Individuals from Mote Marine Laboratory, Florida Atlantic University, Harbor Branch, Georgia Institute of Technology, the United States Geological Survey, and the NOAA Office of Ocean Exploration participated in the expedition. The expedition gathered information about life around and within the hole, seawater composition, and the hole's bottom sediments. A follow-up expedition is planned in August 2020 to a deeper blue hole named the "Green Banana" off the coast of Florida.

In contrast to the various successful expeditions completed, many explorers have perished in their attempts to reach the bottom of a blue hole. The Red Sea Blue Hole located in Egypt is nicknamed the "Divers' Cemetery" because at least 40 divers have died there.

== See also ==
- Electromagnetic absorption by water
- Karst topography
- List of sinkholes
