= Locair =

Airline of the United States

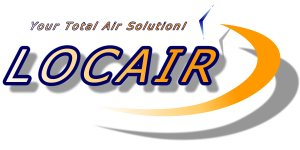
IATA	ICAO	Call sign
ZQ	LOC	LOCAIR
- Founded: 1993
- Ceased operations: 2010
- Hubs: Ft. Lauderdale, Florida;
- Fleet size: 2
- Destinations: 2
- Headquarters: uninc. Broward County, Florida, United States
- Key people: (new owners)
- Website: http://www.locair.net

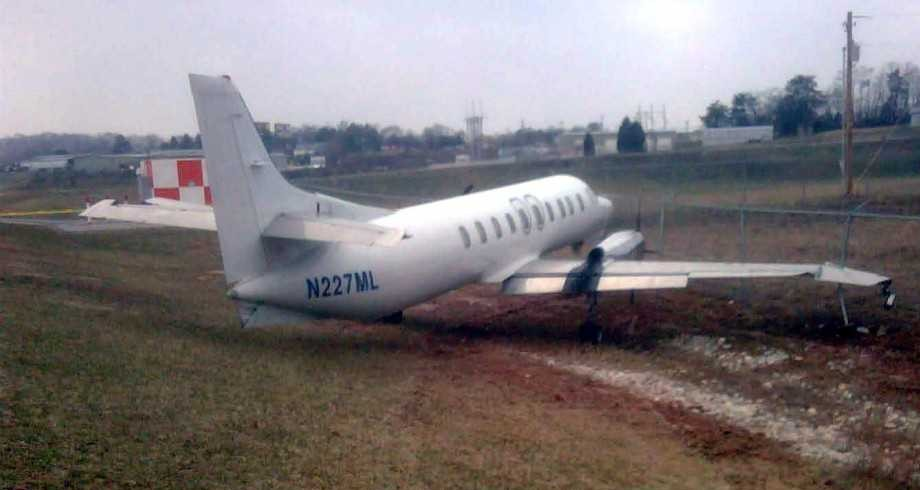
Locair N227ML wreckage

Locair was an American FAR Part 135 charter airline with its headquarters in unincorporated Broward County, Florida, near Fort Lauderdale. Formed in 1993, the airline specialized in cargo and passenger charters around Florida and to the Bahamas and Cuba. The airline is unique in that it is an FAA Part 135 On-Demand (Air Taxi) airline, it has Scheduled Authority for operations in the Bahamas, allowing it to schedule flights and offer online booking, unlike other charter operators in Florida. The carrier has said it will not exceed its operational authority by the United States Department of Transportation and FAA (no more than 4 flights a week between any two points).

Locair provided services on behalf of Air Azul as part of the United States Department of Transportation Essential Air Service Program between Nashville and Somerset. This arrangement came to an end on March 20 due to regulatory issues surrounding the use of the name "Air Azul", and Locair will rebrand the flights to Locair to satisfy a request by JetBlue and the DOT in which Air Azul was selling tickets to the public without a proper DOT 380 filing & signed agreement with Locair. That date marks the first canceled flight by Locair. Locair then filled a void by linking Ft. Lauderdale and Stella Maris Stella Maris Airport, Long Island, an island in the Bahamas with no direct or nonstop air service to the United States due to the length of flight, in late 2009. Flights operated twice a week. Services from Ft Lauderdale to Marsh Harbour and Treasure Cay also began that year.

Locair has been successful in linking Somerset, Kentucky to the Washington DC area with flights to both Baltimore and Washington Dulles, operating as a DOT Part 298 Air Taxi. As of February 19, 2010 Locair is no longer flying out of Somerset, Kentucky.

Locair was sold in 2010 to new owners with hopes of expanding to the Bahamas and rebranding the airline as Starfish Airlines. However, the new owners were not successful and ultimately the airline closed definitely.

== Former Destinations ==
- Somerset, Kentucky (Lake Cumberland Regional Airport)
- Marsh Harbour, Abaco (Marsh Harbour Airport)
- Stella Maris, Long Island (Stella Maris Airport)
- Treasure Cay, Abaco (Treasure Cay Airport)
- Baltimore, Maryland (Baltimore/Washington International Airport)
- Fort Lauderdale, Florida (Fort Lauderdale-Hollywood International Airport)
- St. Petersburg/Clearwater (St. Petersburg-Clearwater International Airport

== Fleet ==
- 1 Fairchild Metro II
- 1 Fairchild Metro III

== See also ==
- List of defunct airlines of the United States
- Air Azul
