= William Trubridge =

New Zealand freediver and record holder

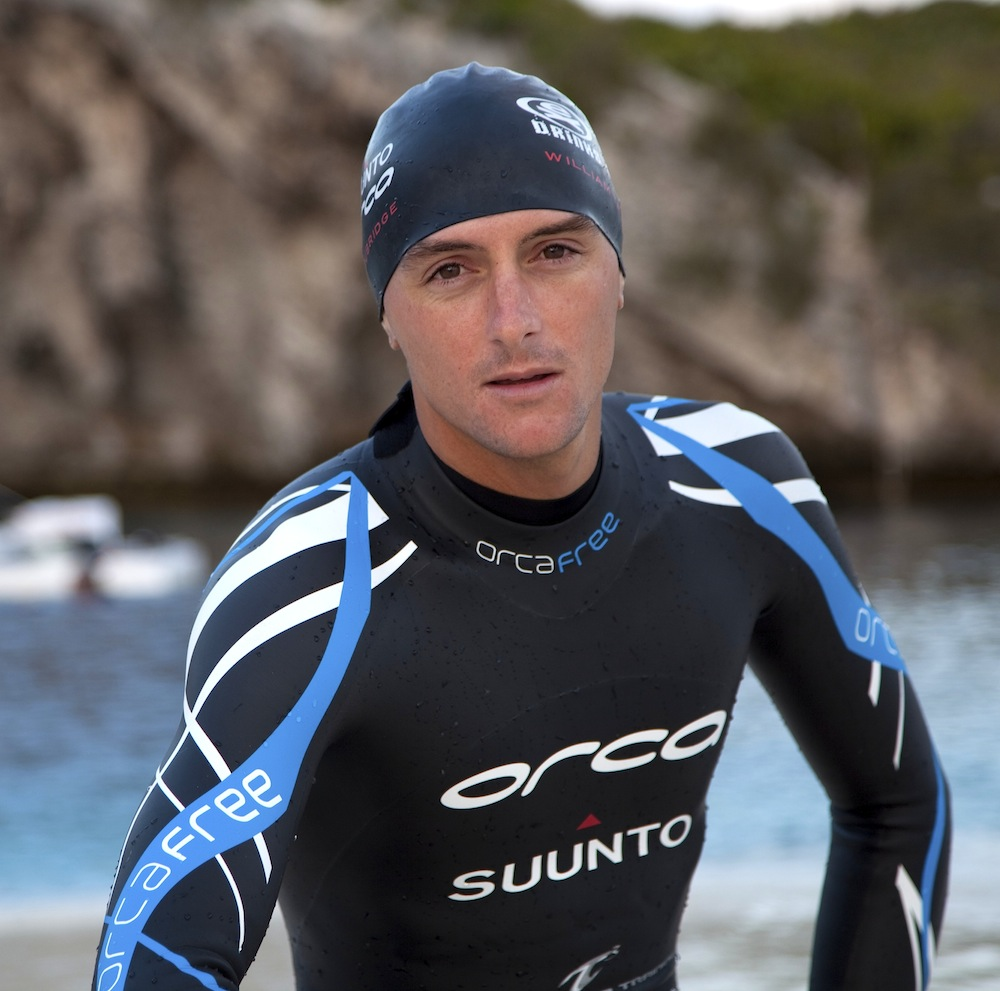
Trubridge in 2010 Photo: Paolo Valenti

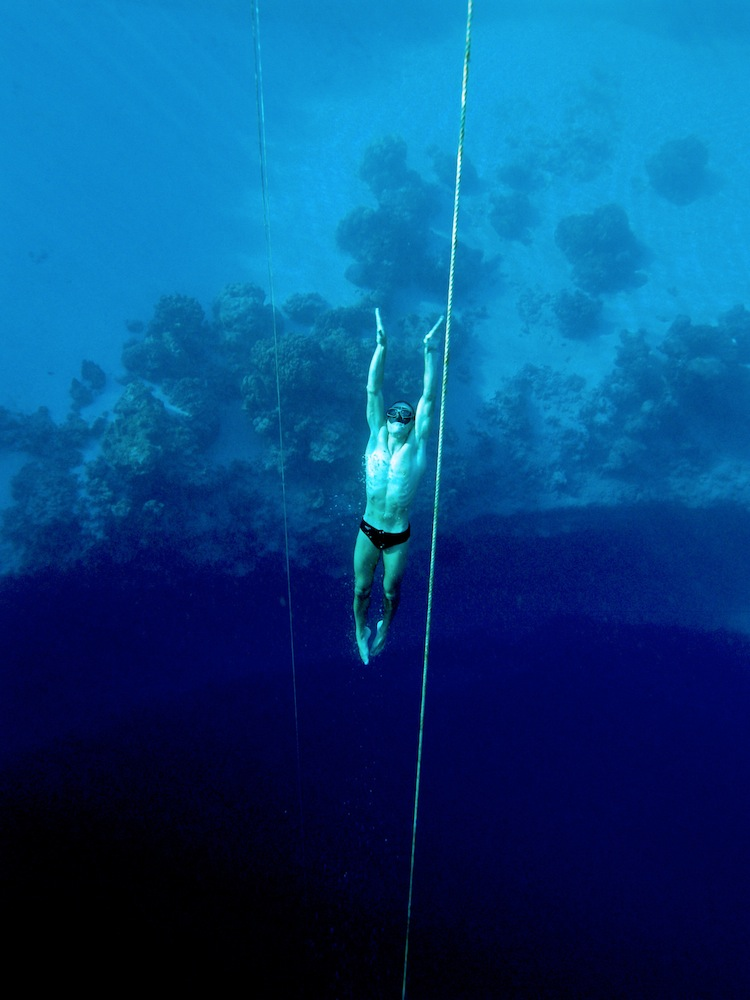
Trubridge while freediving

William Trubridge MNZM (born 24 May 1980) is a New Zealand world champion and former world record holding freediver.

Trubridge was the first diver to go deeper than 100 metres (330 ft) without fins and held the world record in the free immersion discipline from 2010-2018 and constant weight without fins discipline from 2010-2025.

== Life ==
Trubridge was born in Northumberland in northern England, but moved with his family to New Zealand when he was eighteen months old. He was educated at Havelock North High School.

As a diver, Trubridge mainly competes in depth disciplines. He has scored the highest number of points for an individual at the Team's World Championships, 313.3, which he achieved at the 2010 Freediving Team's World Championships held in Okinawa, Japan.

On 18 January 2011, Trubridge won the World's Absolute Freediver Award (WAFA), as the best all around freediver, with the highest combined score in six freediving disciplines: static apnea, dynamic apnea with fins, dynamic apnea without fins (pool disciplines), constant weight apnea with fins, constant weight without fins, and free immersion (depth disciplines).

Trubridge is an Apnea Academy instructor and as of 2013 operated a freediving school and annual competition, both called Vertical Blue, at Dean's Blue Hole in Long Island, Bahamas from September to May. During the summer he teaches courses in Europe and has trained at the Tenerife Top Training Center.

Trubridge was the main subject of a documentary entitled "Breathe" directed by Martin Khodabakhshian, which documents Trubridge's pursuits in 2010 to become the first free diver ever to reach 300 feet with a single breath in the discipline of constant weight no fins.

On 15 February 2019 Trubridge became the first man to complete an 'underwater crossing' of one of the major channels, swimming across the Cook Strait as a series of 934 breath hold dives. He wore fins and swam with a dolphin kick horizontally underwater at a depth between 3–5 meters, surfacing only for short recoveries during which he remained immobile. The crossing took 9 hours 15 minutes and was done to raise awareness of the plight of New Zealand's Hector's and Māui dolphins, which are both threatened with extinction due predominantly to over-fishing in their ranges.

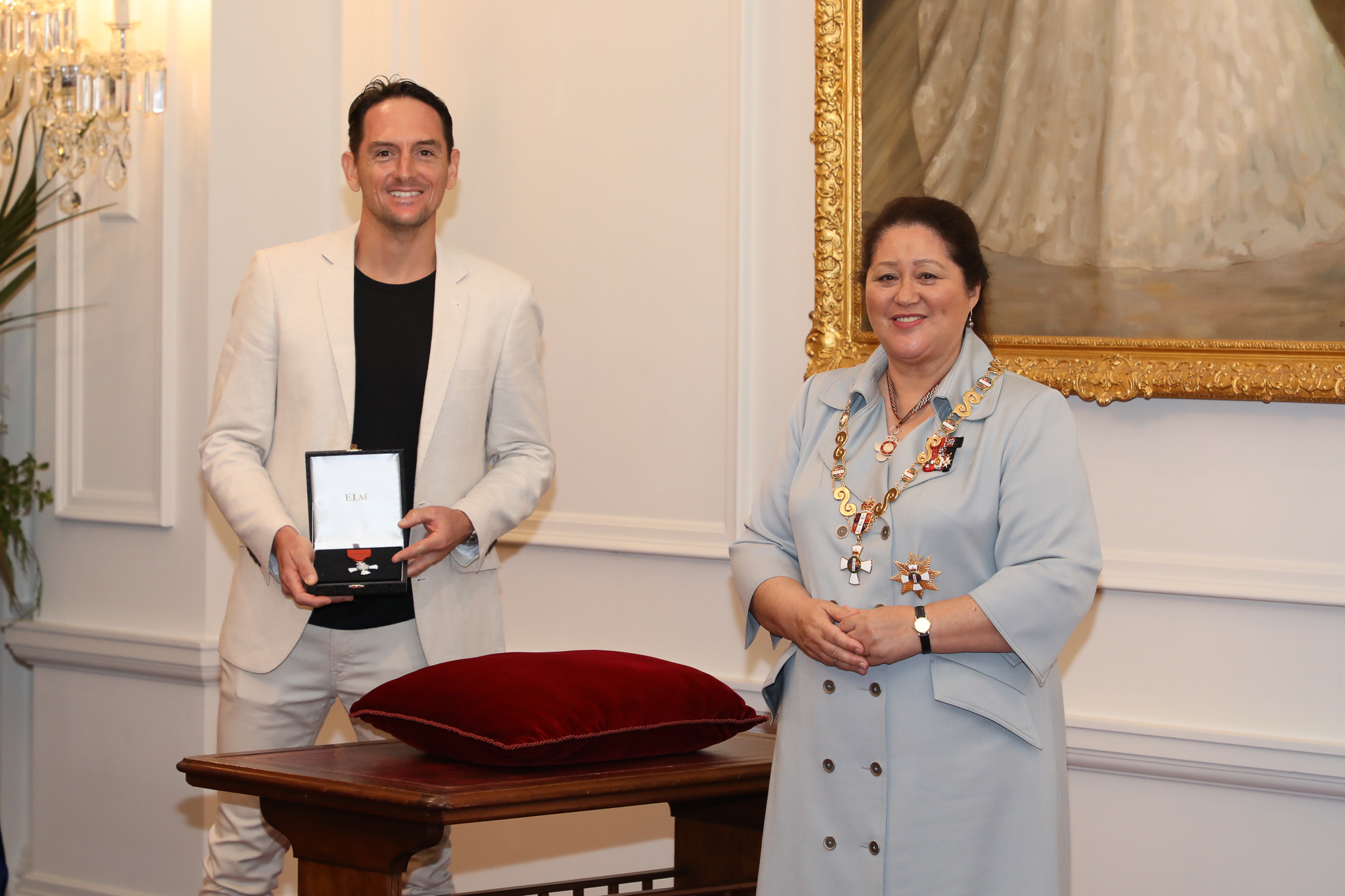
Trubridge (left), after his investiture as a Member of the New Zealand Order of Merit by the governor-general, Dame Cindy Kiro, at Government House, Wellington, on 10 December 2021

In the 2021 New Year Honours, Trubridge was appointed a Member of the New Zealand Order of Merit, for services to free diving.

On May 26, 2025, in Sharm El Sheikh, Croatian athlete Petar Klovar ended Trubridge’s 17-Year Legendary Reign dominating the CNF discipline with a unassisted dive to 103m without fins.

== World records ==
- 81 m (265.74 ft) Constant Weight without fins, 9 April 2007
- 82 m (269.02 ft) Constant Weight without fins, 11 April 2007
- 84 m (275.59 ft) Constant Weight without fins, 4 April 2008
- 107 m (351.04 ft) Free Immersion, 8 April 2008
- 86 m (282.15 ft) Constant Weight without fins, 10 April 2008
- 108 m (354.33 ft) Free Immersion, 11 April 2008
- 88 m (288.71 ft) Constant Weight without fins, 10 April 2009
- 90 m (295.27 ft) Constant Weight without fins, 3 December 2009
- 92 m (301.83 ft) Constant Weight without fins, 19 April 2010
- 116 m (380.57 ft) Free Immersion, 22 April 2010
- 95 m (311.67 ft) Constant Weight without fins, 26 April 2010
- 96 m (314.96 ft) Constant Weight without fins, 10 December 2010
- 100 m (328.08 ft) Constant Weight without fins, 14 December 2010
- 101 m (331.36 ft) Constant Weight without fins, 16 December 2010
- 121 m (396.98 ft) Free Immersion, 10 April 2011
- 122 m (~400 ft) Free Immersion, 30 April 2016
- 124 m (~407 ft) Free Immersion, 2 May 2016
- 102 m (334.65 ft) Constant Weight without fins, 21 July 2016

== Personal bests ==
Discipline		Result	Accreditation
Time	STA	7:29min	AIDA
Distance	DNF	187m	AIDA
Distance	DYN	237m	AIDA
Depth	CNF	102m	AIDA
Depth	CWT	121m	AIDA
Depth	CWT BF		CMAS
Depth	FIM	124m	AIDA
Depth	VWT		
Depth	NLT		
Team		313.3pts	AIDA
