= Stella Maris, Bahamas =

Resort town in the Bahamas

Coordinates: 23°36′N 75°16′W

Stella Maris is a resort town in Long Island, the Bahamas. It was established during 1963. Stella Maris has a year-round population estimated at 80 people.

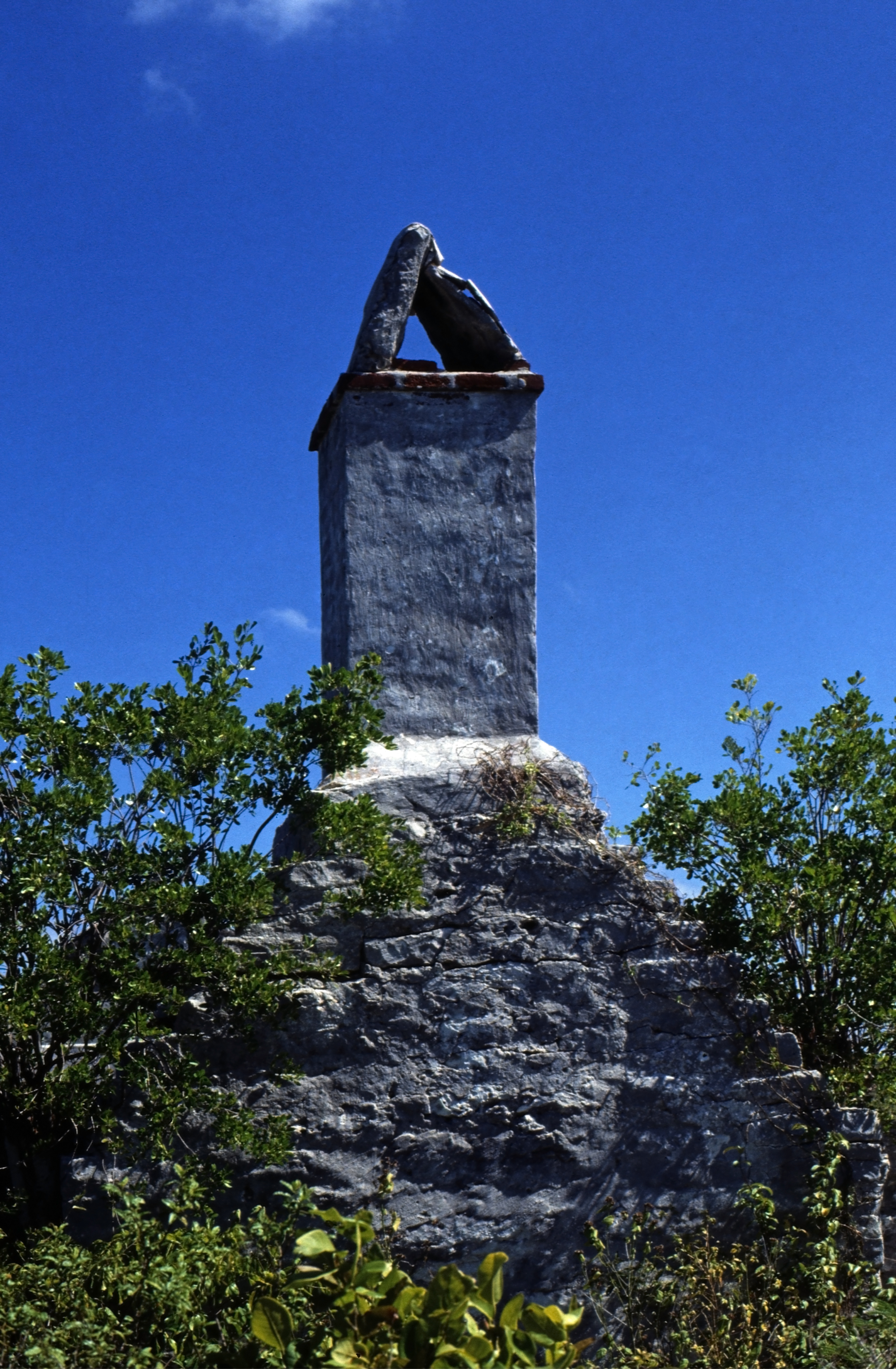
Adderley's Plantation in Stella Maris

== Transportation ==
The town is served by Stella Maris Airport, with services on Southern Air Charter to Nassau and Deadman's Cay, Bahamas.
