= Dean's Blue Hole =

Deep water-filled sinkhole in the Bahamas

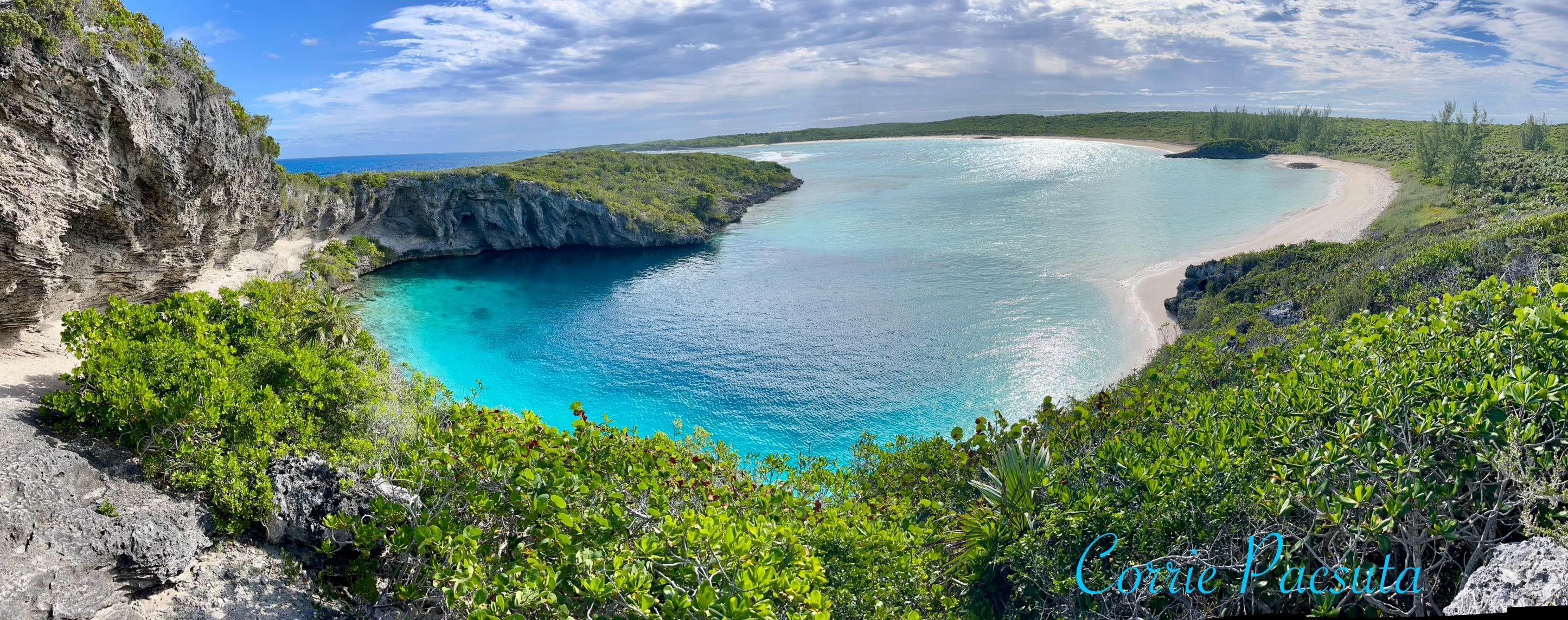
- Dean's Blue Hole

- Location within Bahamas Location within the Caribbean
- Location: Clarence Town, Long Island, Bahamas
- Coordinates: 23°6′23″N 75°0′31″W
- Depth: 202 metres (663 ft)
- Geology: Blue hole

Dean's Blue Hole is a blue hole located in Long Island, Bahamas in a bay located west of Clarence Town.

With a depth of 202 metres (663 ft), it is world's third deepest blue hole after the Taam Ja' Blue Hole in the Chetumal Bay and Dragon Hole in the South China Sea. The blue hole has a diameter of approximately 30 m but widens into a cavern with a diameter of 100 m.

== Development ==
It is believed that the blue hole was caused by either a fault in the limestone that allowed a corrosive solution to rise or that a buried cavern collapsed creating a sinkhole.

== Freediving ==
Due to its depth, Dean's Blue Hole is the site of a number of free diving world records.

In April 2010, New Zealander William Trubridge broke the world record reaching a depth of 92 m without the use of fins. Trubridge operated the Vertical Blue freediving competition at Dean's Blue Hole.

In July 2025, Walid Boudhiaf, set a new Tunisian national record of 118 m at Vertical Blue 2025. The 2025 competition featured 20-odd divers including Trubridge, Alenka Artnik, Alice Modolo, Arnaud Jerald, and Filippo Carletti.

One free diver, Nicholas Mevoli, however, died at Dean's Blue Hole in November 2013 attempting to set a new American national record.
