= Taam Ja' Blue Hole =

Marine sinkhole

Taam Ja' blue hole
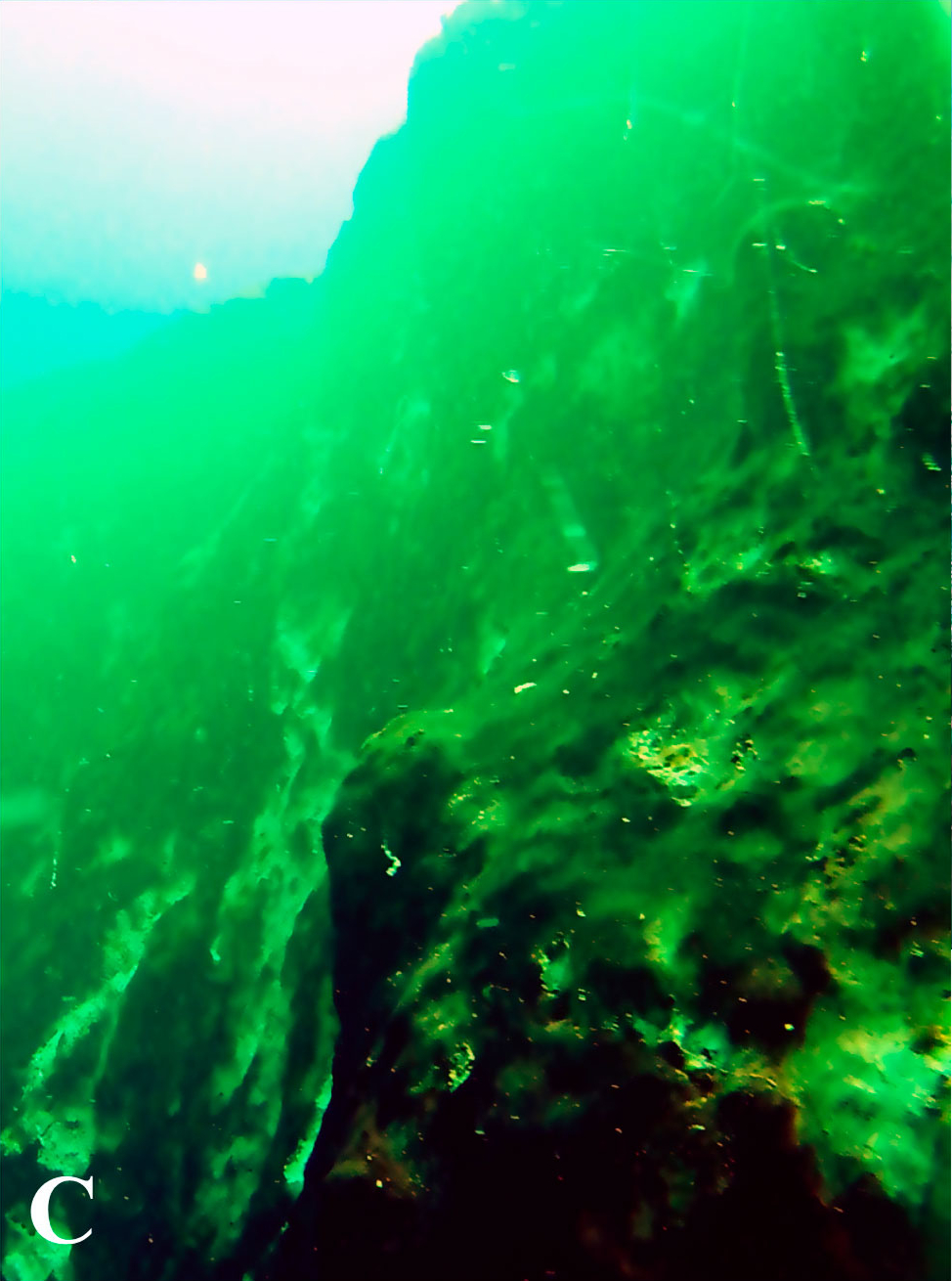
- Subaquatic view of the mouth of the Taam ja' Blue Hole
- Interactive map of Taam Ja' blue hole
- Location: in Chetumal Bay at the southeast corner of the Yucatán Peninsula, Mexico
- Coordinates: 18°37′19.27″N 88°08′55.21″W
- Depth: 420 m (1,378 ft) (current measurement)

Location of the Taam Ja' blue hole (red) and the Great Blue Hole (blue).

Taam Ja' blue hole is an underwater sinkhole located in Chetumal Bay at the southeast corner of the Yucatán Peninsula, Mexico. Its name means deep water in the Mayan language. While the bottom of the hole still has not been physically explored, the hole has been estimated to be over 420 metres (1,380 ft) deep, making it the deepest known blue hole.

== Discovery ==
It was discovered in about 2003 by a local diver, named Jesús Artemio Poot-Vill, who followed a grouper that went into its mouth. The hole was forgotten until the son of that fisherman began working with marine academic Juan Carlos Alcérreca-Huerta, who took soundings of its depth and was surprised by the results.

The initial rediscovery came in 2016, when it was thought that the hole had a depth of 275 meters (902 feet), which still would have placed it as the second deepest blue hole, in comparisons to the Dragon Hole, at 300.89 metres (987 ft), and Dean's Blue Hole, at 202 metres (663 ft). In 2021, Poot-Vill came into contact with researchers, which led to further study. On December 6, 2023 and December 13, 2023, expeditions were led to identify the environmental conditions of the hole, the results of which were later published in 2024.

== Properties ==
Like other blue holes, Taam Ja' has a distinctive dark blue color, distinguishing it from the blue-green color of the water around it. However, its color is more subtle than other notable blue holes, such as the Great Blue Hole, and there are no islands nearby the hole, which is what enabled it to go so long without discovery.

The mouth of the hole is nearly circular, with a major axis measuring 151.8 metres (498 ft), oriented about 10.76 degrees clockwise from North – similarly to the orientation of major faults in the area. The current known depth of the hole was estimated using echo sounding. However, the process of echo sounding used can only detect to a depth of 500 meters (1,640 feet), and it has been hypothesized the attached cable may have drifted due to underwater currents or bumped into a ledge, giving the current depth of 420 meters. The bottom of the hole still has not been found. There is also the possibility that sonar technology is unreliable in Taam Ja', as blue holes can vary in shape, which may affect results. As per a 2024 research paper:

However, echo sounding methods face challenges in complex environments like blue holes or inland sinkholes arising from frequency-dependent detection and range limitations due to water density vertical gradients, cross-sectional depth variations, or morphometric deviations in non-strictly vertical caves.

Nonetheless, the current known depth still places the Taam Ja' blue hole as the deepest known blue hole.
