= JetAmerica =

IATA	ICAO	Call sign
J1	BSK	BISCAYNE
- Founded: 2007; 19 years ago (as Air Azul)
- Ceased operations: 2009; 17 years ago
- Focus cities: Toledo Express Airport; Newark Liberty International Airport
- Parent company: Sun America inc.
- Headquarters: Pinellas County, Florida
- Key people: Steve Schoen

Sun America, Inc., doing business as JetAmerica, was a proposed American low-cost scheduled public charter airline headquartered in unincorporated Pinellas County, Florida. On March 10, 2009, the airline announced a number of public scheduled charter flights from underutilized airports to Newark and Minneapolis–St. Paul using a Miami Air International Boeing 737-800 to begin on June 30, 2009. On May 27, 2009, the airline held its first press conference at Toledo Express Airport, Ohio, announcing its first focus city and the start of flight operations on July 13, 2009. The airline announced the station markets of Lansing, Michigan, Melbourne, Florida, Minneapolis, Minnesota, Newark, New Jersey, South Bend, Indiana, and Toledo, Ohio. The airline also publicly stated it was evaluating service to Baltimore, Maryland, Charleston, West Virginia, Chicago Midway, Illinois, Rockford, Illinois, Cincinnati, Columbus, and Dayton, Ohio, Greensboro, North Carolina, Hartford, Connecticut, Pittsburgh, Pennsylvania, and Clearwater, Florida. The airline later delayed the start of service to August 14, 2009. However, JetAmerica did not begin service as it was unable to finalize slots at Newark.

On July 18, 2009, the company announced suspension of operations, with refunds to customers who had already bought tickets.

== Air Azul ==
Steve Schoen, the chairman of Sun America, the parent company of JetAmerica, was a primary investor of the failed Southeast Airlines, another low-cost carrier which declined into bankruptcy following concerns of improper recordkeeping and maintenance issues. Steve Schoen did not invest money in the endeavor but convinced other investors to put up the seed money for JetAmerica.

JetAmerica had planned to operate under the name Air Azul, but on May 4, 2009, the company changed its name to JetAmerica, citing internal changes including no longer being associated with Sun Country Airlines. Concerns were addressed that its name was too similar to a Brazilian airline (Azul Brazilian Airlines) founded by former JetBlue founder, David Neeleman.

The airline also had partnered with Locair to provide Fairchild Metro service between Somerset, Kentucky, and Nashville, Tennessee. This agreement, however, was terminated earlier in 2009, when the business plan was changed to the JetAmerica idea.

Air Azul had planned flights to Newark, Baltimore, and various midwestern cities. The Baltimore flights were dropped after Air Azul suspended flights in April 2009 and was renamed JetAmerica.

== Destinations ==
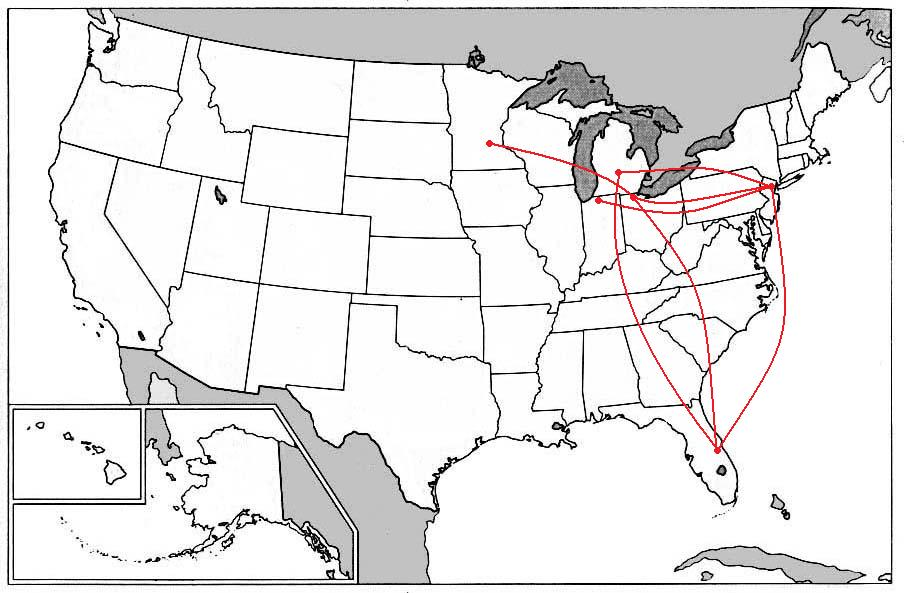
JetAmerica Proposed Route Map

JetAmerica's proposed schedule included services to the following destinations in the United States:

Florida

- Melbourne (Melbourne Orlando International Airport): Service to Newark (3× weekly), Lansing (1× weekly), and Toledo (2× weekly).

Indiana

- South Bend (South Bend Regional Airport): Service to Newark (2× weekly).

Michigan

- Lansing (Capital Region International Airport): Service to Melbourne (1× weekly) and Newark (3× weekly).

Minnesota

- Minneapolis (Minneapolis–Saint Paul International Airport): Service to Toledo (3× weekly)

New Jersey

- Newark (Newark Liberty International Airport): Service to Lansing (3× weekly), Melbourne (3× weekly), South Bend (2× weekly), and Toledo (6× weekly).

Ohio

- Toledo (Toledo Express Airport): Service to Melbourne (2× weekly), Minneapolis (3× weekly), and Newark (6× weekly).

== Fleet ==
JetAmerica Fleet
Aircraft	Total
Boeing 737-800	1

JetAmerica had announced plans to add a second Boeing 737-800 in July, and up to as many as four by July 2010. The company's business plan, as announced by Weikle, would have added an additional aircraft every four months.

When JetAmerica was known as Air Azul, it planned to operate flights with air crew and aircraft leased from Sun Country Airlines using a Boeing 737-800 with 12 first class seats and 150 coach seats, but financing and business plan changes altered this.

== See also ==
- List of defunct airlines of the United States
