= Deadman's Cay Airport =

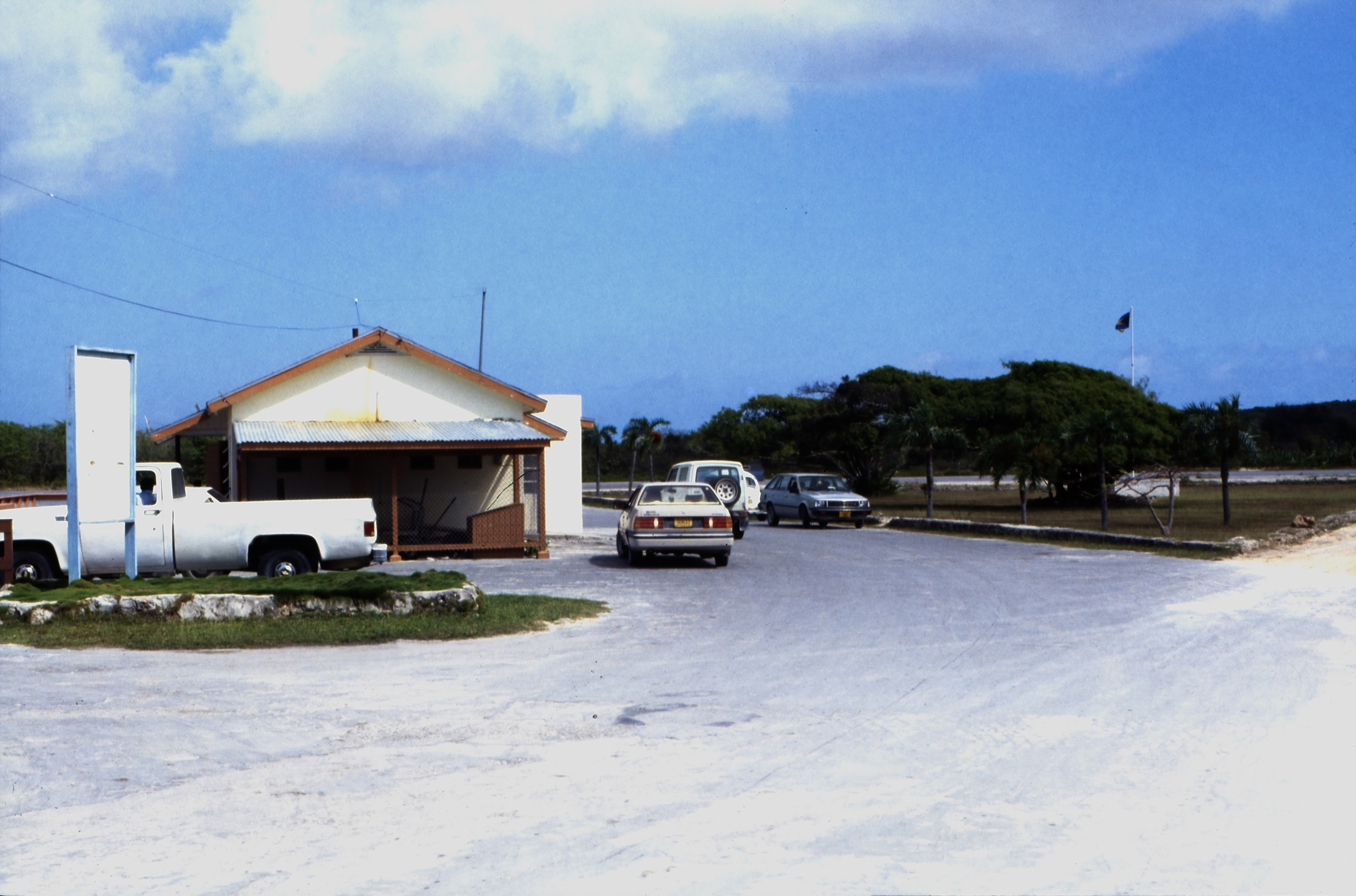
- Main terminal, 1989
- IATA: LGI; ICAO: MYLD

Summary
- Airport type: Public
- Serves: Long Island, The Bahamas
- Location: Deadman's Cay
- Elevation AMSL: 9 ft (2.7 m)
- Coordinates: 23°10′45″N 075°05′37″W

Map
- Location in The Bahamas

Runways
Direction	Length		Surface
Direction	m	ft	Surface
09/27	1,219	3,999	Asphalt
- Source: DAFIF

Deadman's Cay Airport (IATA: LGI, ICAO: MYLD) is an airport located in the settlement of Deadman's Cay on Long Island in The Bahamas. The airport serves the island’s capital, Clarence Town, as well as the general south of the island.

== Facilities ==
The airport resides at an elevation of 9 ft (2.7 m) above mean sea level. It has one runway designated 09/27 with an asphalt surface measuring 1,219 m × 30 m (3,999 ft × 98 ft).

== Expansion ==
In 2025 a long awaited expansion was announced. This includes extending the runway from 1,219 m (3,999 ft) to 1,981 m (6,499 ft), raising the elevation to improve drainage, and adding a new international terminal. This expansion will allow larger jets such as 737s to land at the airport, and will include customs and immigration agencies. During construction air traffic will be rerouted to Stella Maris for at least 3 months.

The airport closed on January 19, 2026. In April it was forecast to reopen in the summer, however the latest published date is that BahamasAir may restart flights into Deadman's Cay airport on December 15, 2026.

== Airlines and destinations ==
Airlines	Destinations
Bahamasair	Nassau, San Salvador
Southern Air Charter	Nassau, Stella Maris
