= Lake Cumberland Regional Airport =

- IATA: SME; ICAO: KSME; FAA LID: SME

Summary
- Airport type: Public
- Owner: Somerset-Pulaski County
- Serves: Somerset, Kentucky
- Elevation AMSL: 927 ft / 283 m
- Coordinates: 37°03′13″N 084°36′56″W
- Interactive map of Lake Cumberland Regional Airport

Runways
Direction	Length		Surface
Direction	ft	m	Surface
05/23	5,801	1,768	Asphalt

Statistics (2021)
- Aircraft operations (year ending 4/13/2021): 27,997
- Based aircraft: 37
- Source: Federal Aviation Administration

Lake Cumberland Regional Airport (IATA: SME, ICAO: KSME, FAA LID: SME) is a public use airport located three nautical miles (6 km) south of the central business district of Somerset, a city in Pulaski County, Kentucky, United States. The airport is owned by the city of Somerset and Pulaski County. It also serves the area around Lake Cumberland. It is mostly used for general aviation, and from late 2008 until February 2010, was served by one commercial airline, Locair. The $3 million federally funded passenger terminal was converted to the FBO in September 2011.

The airport was renamed in 2008; it was formerly known as Somerset-Pulaski County Airport or J.T. Wilson Field.

== Facilities and aircraft ==
Lake Cumberland Regional Airport covers an area of 288 acres (117 ha) at an elevation of 927 feet (283 m) above mean sea level. It has one asphalt paved runway designated 5/23 which measures 5,801 by 100 feet (1,768 x 30 m).

For the 12-month period ending April 13, 2021, the airport had 27,997 aircraft operations, an average of 77 per day: 89% general aviation, 5% air taxi, and 5% military. At that time there were 37 aircraft based at this airport: 23 single-engine, 4 multi-engine, 5 jet and 5 helicopter.

== Airlines and destinations ==
Lake Cumberland Regional Airport currently does not have commercial service.

== See also ==
- List of airports in Kentucky
