= Dragon Hole =

Deep underwater sinkhole in the South China Sea

- Yongle Blue Hole
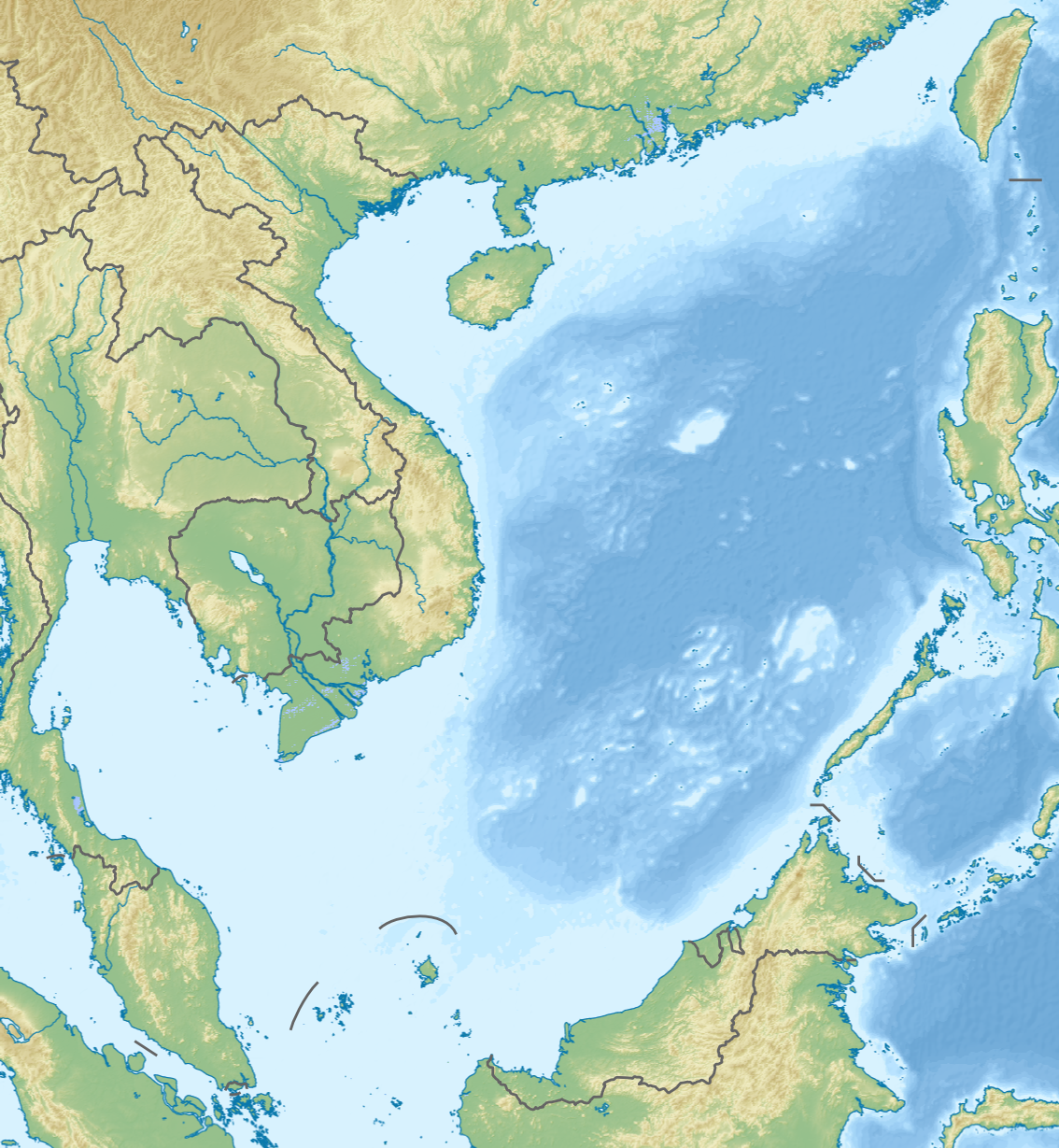
- Location within South China Sea
- Location: Paracel Islands
- Coordinates: 16.524912°N 111.768089°E
- Depth: 300.89 metres

Dragon Hole, also known as Sansha Yongle Blue Hole (Chinese:永乐蓝洞) after the third Ming emperor, Yongle, was the deepest known blue hole in the world at 300.89 metres (987.2 ft) deep from 2016 until it was discovered that the Taam Ja' surpassed it in 2024. It is located about 9 kilometres (5.6 mi) north of Drummond Island in the Paracel Islands. Blue holes generate a distinctive dark blue colour when seen from above and are typically only a few dozen meters deep.

The local fishermen call it the "eye" of the South China Sea, and according to legend it is where the Monkey King, depicted in the novel Journey to the West, found his golden cudgel.

Dragon Hole is about 100 metres (330 ft) deeper than Dean's Blue Hole in the Bahamas. There are several fresh water sinkholes on land that are deeper than Dragon Hole. These include Mexico's Zacatón (335 metres [1,099 ft]), Pozzo del Merro in Italy (392 metres [1,286 ft]) and Hranice abyss in the Czech Republic (404 metres [1,325 ft]).

The Sansha Yongle blue hole was created around the same time as the surrounding South China Sea islands. Blue holes can be formed in a number of ways. The most common is melting ice structures in the surface resulting in large pits where ice once was. Blue holes may also be formed after a disruption in the surface of the ocean floor by tectonic shifts that result in the settlement of sand and debris. The Blue Hole in Belize was once a dry land cave; its present form is a result of sea level rise and subsequent roof collapse.

== Discovery ==
The exact location of the Dragon Hole is N16°31.55'. E111°46.1'. Geographically the hole is found in the eastern Atoll near the Paracel Islands, in the South China Sea.

According to the Xinhua News agency, upon discovery by local fishermen, the first research methods included using a Video Ray Pro 4 underwater robot. This robot found the depth of the hole to be 987 feet (301 m) and a width in some places of 426 feet (130 m). Over 20 new species of sea life were discovered during the initial exploration efforts.

Other information that was gained from initial exploration was the distinct difference in chemical makeup between water columns. At the 300 feet (91 m) mark the levels of oxygen fall off making it more difficult for life to survive. This information leads to speculation on what can be learned from researching the Dragon Hole.

== Research ==
Due to the surrounding geological challenges, new research methods were created in order to study the hole. The surrounding coral is only at an average depth of 0.5–0.8 metres (1 ft 8 in – 2 ft 7 in), therefore discouraging any large research vessels from accessing the opening of the Dragon Hole.

One new method was the use of a boat that had a flat bottom that allowed it to rest above the entrance to the hole despite the shallow waters surrounding it. This vessel is used as a staging platform for gathering data, as well as deploying the Remotely Operated Vehicle (ROV). Due to the use of an "underwater integrated navigation system" the ROV was capable of receiving real-time commands allowing for control over movement and observation.

The device carrier or flat bottom vessel served as an important tool to transport sampling and research equipment on site without damage of the surrounding reefs and environment. The total size of this research vessel was 25 by 18 metres (82 ft × 59 ft).

The ROV or device was a total size of 3.0 by 1.7 by 1.7 metres (9.8 ft × 5.6 ft × 5.6 ft). What was specifically used was a "FCV2000D professional grade ROV".

Blue holes are very valuable to scientists regarding the research of climate change, marine ecology as well as geochemistry and diversification between water columns. Throughout the research conducted on the Dragon Hole, a multitude of data was collected.

=== Tidal measurements ===
Tide gauge stations were temporarily deployed around the Dragon Hole as well as on the research vessel. This measurement technique resulted in an accuracy within 3 centimetres (1.2 in).

=== Surveying ===
The use of the ROV allowed for three-dimensional topography of the entire blue hole. The ROV, equipped with a multibeam device, made scans of the entirety of the underwater system. Combining this with digital scans of the surface of the hole, a three-dimensional model has been created.

=== Hydrochemical properties ===
The Sansha Yongle Blue hole, as the deepest of its kind when discovered, allowed for the largest data collection surface available for this specific research. Through gathered data, it became evident to researchers that two thermoclines were distinguishable within the water column. The first transition between warmer mixed water and colder stagnant water occurs between 13 and 20 metres (43 and 66 ft). The second thermocline occurs lower in the water column at around 70–150 metres (230–490 ft). Sampling of water from different depths and layers allows for the gathering of information about rock sediment, minerals, bacteria, organisms, and chemical research. The study of this information can be used to discover critical data about the history of the world dating back to when the Dragon Hole was formed
