= Nicholas Mevoli =

American freediver who died while attempting to set a record (1981–2013)

Personal information
- Full name: Nicholas Lawrence Mevoli III
- Nickname(s): Nick, Nic
- Nationality: United States
- Born: August 22, 1981; Dunedin, Florida, U.S.
- Died: November 17, 2013 (aged 32); The Bahamas

Sport
- Sport: Free-diving

Nicholas Lawrence Mevoli III (August 22, 1981 – November 17, 2013) was an American freediver who died while attempting to set an American record at the Vertical Blue competition at Dean's Blue Hole in the Bahamas.

== Early life ==
Mevoli was born in Dunedin, Florida, and lived in Williamsburg, Brooklyn, New York. He worked as a prop technician in the film and television industry in New York, including on The CW series Gossip Girl and the Comedy Central series Chappelle's Show. He was also an actor, technician and writer with Rising Sun Performance Company, and starred in the 2004 independent film Exist.

Mevoli began free-diving competitively in early 2012. He won titles twice at the Deja Blue competition and finished third at the Caribbean Cup in Roatán, Honduras. He achieved an American record in the Caribbean Cup on May 27, 2013, with a dive to 100 meters in the Constant Weight (CWT) category. He finished third in the Constant Weight Without Fins (CNF) category at the free-diving world championships in Greece in September 2013.

== Death ==
On November 15, 2013, Mevoli attempted to reach a depth of 96 metres (315 ft) in the Free Immersion (FIM) category at Vertical Blue, but had to turn back at 80 metres (260 ft) after suffering an upper respiratory squeeze.

Two days later, Mevoli attempted a CNF dive to 72 metres (236 ft) on a single breath. He began to turn back at 68 metres (223 ft), but appeared to change his mind and dived downward again. Mevoli returned to the surface after 3 minutes and 38 seconds underwater, but fell backward into the ocean and lost consciousness. Safety divers and the event physician attempted to revive Mevoli, whose pulse disappeared. After resuscitation efforts had continued for 90 minutes, he was transported to Vid Simms Memorial Health Center, reportedly suffering from pulmonary edema. Mevoli died at 1:44 p.m. He was the first athlete to die in an international free-diving competition.

The New York Times published a photograph of a visibly distressed Mevoli taken just after his return to the surface from his last dive and shortly before he lost consciousness. Some readers questioned the ethics of publishing the photograph.
