= Chetumal Bay =

Semi-closed mesohaline estuary on the southern coast of the Yucatán Peninsula

Coordinates: 18°20′0″N 88°5′0″W

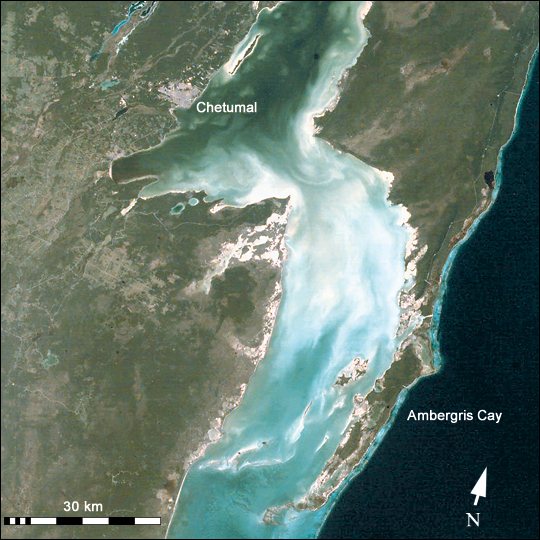
Satellite photo of Chetumal Bay, with the Caribbean Sea (right/east).

Chetumal Bay is a semi-closed mesohaline estuary on the southern coast of the Yucatán Peninsula. It is located in northern Belize and southeastern Mexico.

== Geography ==
The mouth of Chetumal Bay is directed southward and buffered by the large Belizean island of Ambergris Caye. It opens on the Caribbean Sea.

Corozal Bay is a smaller inland inlet, that extends to the southwest in the upper region of Chetumal Bay. It is named after the town of Corozal on it.

Chetumal is a major city on the bay, located in the Mexican state of Quintana Roo.

=== Blue holes ===
Chetumal Bay contains several blue holes, most notably the Taam Ja' Blue Hole. With a depth of at least 420 metres (1,380 ft), it is the world deepest known blue hole.

== See also ==
- Bays of the Caribbean
- Bays of the Gulf of Mexico
