= Stella Maris Airport =

- IATA: SML; ICAO: MYLS

Summary
- Airport type: Public
- Serves: Long Island, Bahamas
- Location: Stella Maris
- Elevation AMSL: 10 ft (3.0 m)
- Coordinates: 24°33′53″N 075°16′14″W

Map
- Location in The Bahamas

Runways
Direction	Length		Surface
Direction	m	ft	Surface
13/31	1,219	3,999	Asphalt
- Source: DAFIF

Stella Maris Airport (IATA: SML, ICAO: MYLS) is an airport located near Stella Maris on Long Island in The Bahamas.

== Facilities ==
The airport resides at an elevation of 10 ft (3.0 m) above mean sea level. It has one runway designated 13/31 with an asphalt surface measuring 1,219 m × 23 m (3,999 ft × 75 ft).

The airport was designed and built by Jack Henry Cordery who was engaged by Stella Maris Estate Company in 1967 when he emigrated from England to take the job of Estate Development Manager.

=== Historical airline service ===
Stella Maris Airport was served in the past by Bahamasair which operated regional turboprop airliners on nonstop flights primarily to Nassau. According to the Official Airline Guide (OAG), in 1975 Bahamasair was serving the airport with Fairchild Hiller FH-227 aircraft which were then replaced with new Hawker Siddeley HS 748 aircraft in 1979. By 1999, Bahamasair was operating de Havilland Canada DHC-8 Dash 8 series 300 aircraft into the airport according to the OAG.
