= Clarence Town =

Town in the Bahamas

- Town
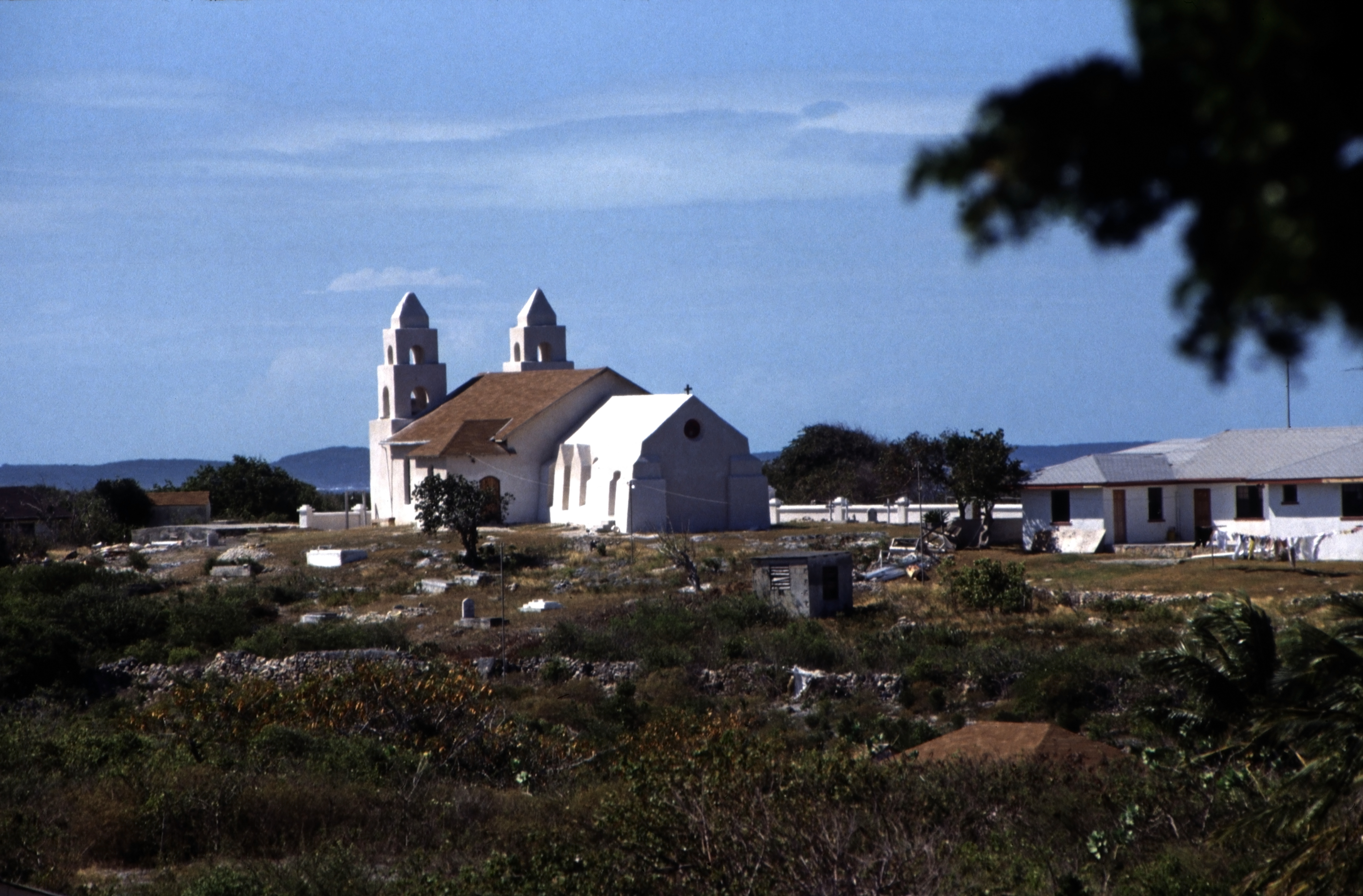
- St. Paul's Anglican Church in Clarence Town on Long Island

- Location within Bahamas
- Coordinates: 23°06′00″N 74°58′58″W
- Country: Bahamas
- Island: Long Island

Population (2010)
  - Total: 1 705
- Time zone: UTC-5 (Eastern Time Zone)
- Area code: 242

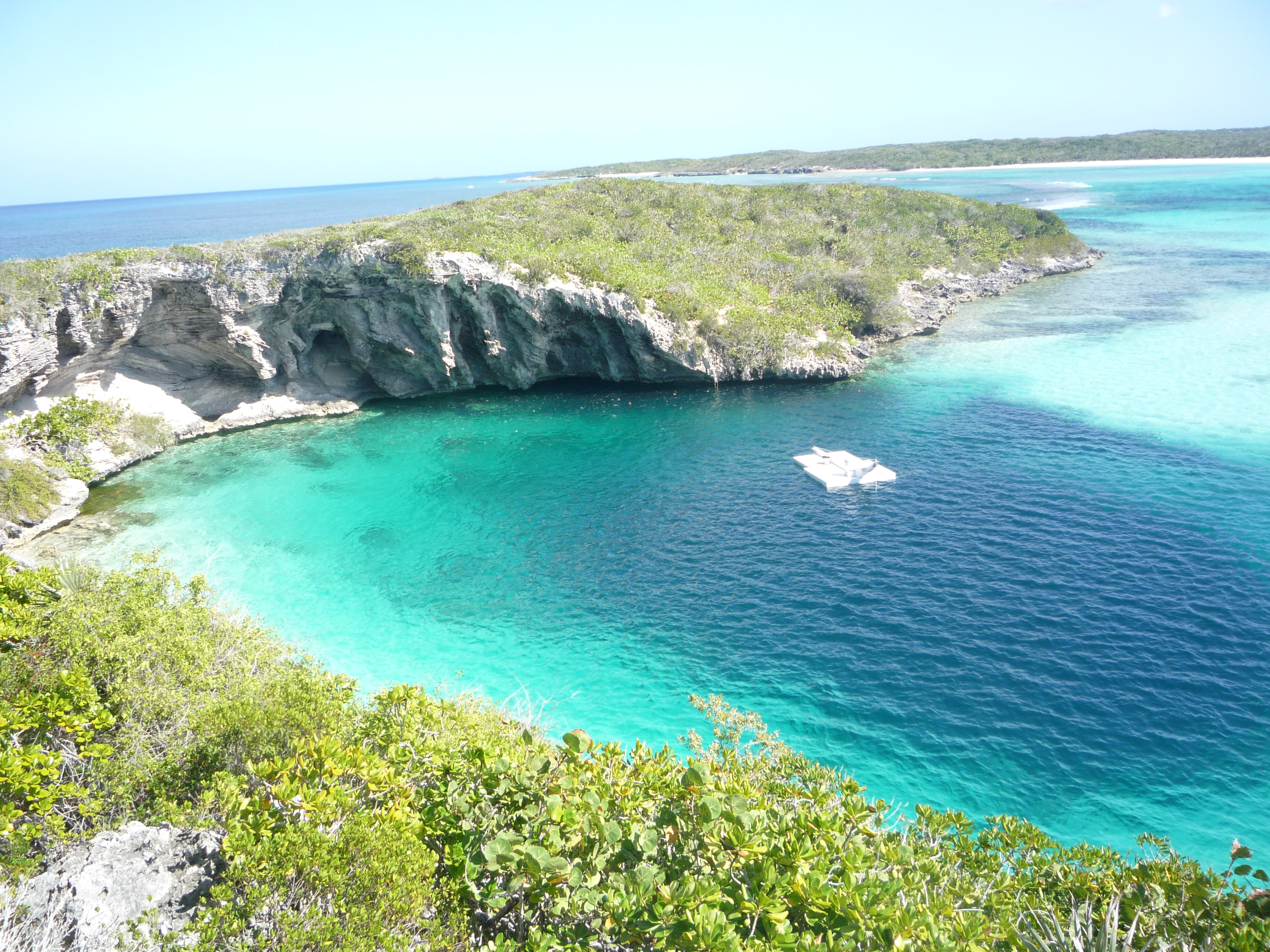
Dean's Blue Hole located near Clarence town

Clarence Town is a town in The Bahamas. It is located on Long Island. Clarence Town is the capital of Long Island and has a population of 86 people as of 2010. It has a marina, two restaurants as well as the government dock where the mail boat docks on a weekly basis. It also has a small grocery store, gas station and a small pub as well as a police station, post office and community centre. There are two churches in Clarence Town, both designed by John Hawes, of similar appearance with their twin towers. One is Anglican/Episcopal, named St. Paul's Anglican Church. The other is Roman Catholic, named St. Peter and Paul.

== Transportation ==
The town and area are served by nearby Deadman's Cay Airport.
