= Long Island, Bahamas =

Island and district in The Bahamas

District of Long Island
- Coordinates: 23.25°N 75.10°W
- Country: Bahamas
- Island: Long Island
- Established: 1996

Government
  - Type: District Council
  - Chief Councillor: Ian Knowles
  - Deputy Chief Councillor: Dwayne Fox

Area
  - Total: 596 km^{2} (230 sq mi)

Population (2022)
  - Total: 2,887
  - Density: 4.84/km^{2} (12.5/sq mi)

Demographics 2010
  - Black: 54.36%
  - Black and White: 20.78%
  - White: 18.07%
  - Other: 5.95%
- Time zone: UTC−5 (EST)
  - Summer (DST): UTC−4 (EDT)
- Area code: 242

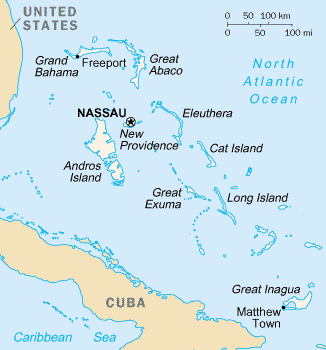
Map of Bahamas

Long Island is an island in The Bahamas that is split by the Tropic of Cancer. It is one of the Districts of the Bahamas and is known as the most scenic island in the Bahamas. Its capital is Clarence Town. The population of Long Island is 3,094 inhabitants.

== Geography ==
Long Island is about 130 kilometers (80 mi) long and 6 km (4 mi) wide at its widest point. The land area is 596 km^{2} (230 sq mi). Long Island is situated about 265 km (165 mi) southeast of the capital of Nassau, which is located on the island of New Providence. The Tropic of Cancer runs through the northern quarter of the island.

The northeast side of Long Island is noted for its steep rocky headlands, while the southwest coast is noted for its broad white beaches with soft sand. The terrain ranges widely throughout the island, including white flat expanses from which salt is extracted, swamplands, beaches, and sloping (in the north) and low (in the south) hills.

Long Island is particularly noted for its caves, which have played a major role in the island's history. Dean's Blue Hole, located west of Clarence Town, is the world's second deepest underwater sinkhole, dropping to a depth of about 200 meters, making it more than double the depth of most other large holes.

Long Island is surrounded by small bays and inlets, including the large New Found Harbour west of Deadman's Cay, at approximately the midsection of the island. There are also smaller islands off-shore, including Sandy Cay.

== History ==
Some writers identify Long Island as the site of one of Christopher Columbus' landfalls during his 1492 voyage. For example, Joseph Judge and Samuel Eliot Morison identify Long Island as corresponding to the third island visited by Columbus, which he called Fernandina and which the indigenous Lucayan people called Yuma, meaning "middle high land". However, a variety of other historians, geographers, and other writers identify Fernandina as corresponding to different islands in the Bahamas, including Little Inagua, Great Exuma, and Andros Island. Archaeological evidence, including ceremonial stools called duhos, shows that the Lucayan Taíno tribe settled on Long Island, probably in the island's cave system. After the demise of the Lucayans, who were taken as slaves to Hispaniola and Cuba, there was no large settlement until the arrival of the Simms family in 1720 who originally arrived in The Bahamas in the 1640s.

The original Loyalists were mainly from New England and New Jersey and arrived on Long Island after fleeing the American Revolution. These families started the first farms, primarily raising cattle and sheep. By the 1790s, settlers began to arrive from the Carolinas and proceeded to set up cotton plantations. The plantations flourished for only a few years and, by the time of the abolition of slavery in 1834, most had collapsed and been abandoned. There are many ruins from this era today, the majority of which are overgrown by bush. There are also remains of some of the houses built after slavery, which are usually small and built of stone. Originally, they had thatched roofs; today, most are shingled. The descendants of these families continue to be widespread on the island.

== Settlements ==
Clarence Town, located in the south-central portion of the island, has a population 86 people. Nearby Deadman's Cay (pop. 328) is the major settlement at the centre of the island and is home to Deadman's Cay Airport, which offers flights daily to Nassau and is the island's largest and busiest airport.

Mangrove Bush (pop. 142) is the home of the island's boatbuilding trade, while Hamilton's (pop. 196) is noted for its extensive cave system that is partially open for tours. Between these settlements is Petty's (pop. 69) known for its small Greek influence and a "fish-house" which helps support the local fishing industry. Salt Pond (pop. 98) is home of the Long Island Regatta, an annual event that draws tourists from around the world. Stella Maris (pop. 80), at the northern part of the island, is the centre of the island's tourism industry and features several resorts. It is served by Stella Maris Airport. Seymour's, the northernmost settlement, has a monument dedicated to Christopher Columbus. Buckley's (pop. 54) is home to Nelson Glandville McFarlane Major High School, as well as the Long Island Library and Museum.

Other settlements include Roses (or Roses Settlement), Scrub Hill, Simms, and Burnt Ground. Most of the island's settlements are named after the families that first settled them. As a result, many (but not all) are named in the possessive form. The settlement of the Gray family, for example, is known as Gray's.

One main road, originally designed for carriages, runs from Cape Santa Maria, at the northern tip of Long Island, to the southern tip at Gordon's. Transport on Long Island is road-based, with limited taxi service available, particularly from Stella Maris to Deadman's Cay and Clarence Town.

== Economy and tourism ==
Part of the economy is based on tourism and farming, but fishing dominates. The inhabitants grow pigeon peas, corn, bananas, and they raise small livestock such as pigs, chickens, goats, and sheep. Some cattle are raised for export.

Due to the generally inhospitable soil of the Bahamas, much of the farming done on Long Island is in the pot-hole style, which involves planting in fertile holes in the limestone where good top soil collects. This method of farming contributes to the success of Long Island farmers, who are usually able to generate enough excess produce to sell their fruits and vegetables throughout the Bahamas.

Tourist opportunities include sailing, fishing, scuba diving, snorkelling and relaxing on beaches. Cape Santa Maria Beach, located at Seymour's, is frequently ranked as one of the most beautiful beaches in the world. Most tourists charter an airplane or take a commercial flight from Exuma International Airport at George Town, Exuma or Nassau. International flights offered by Locair were planned which would have marked the return of regular international flights in over ten years; however, Locair is no longer in business.

=== Airports ===
The island has two airports, Deadman's Cay Airport which is served by Bahamasair and other local air carriers and Stella Maris Airport which also has local air carrier service.

Stella Maris airport was designed and built by Jack Henry Cordery who was engaged by Stella Maris Estate Company in 1967 when he emigrated from England to take the job of Estate Development Manager. He also developed the Marina and built roads. He died on Long Island in 1968 and is buried at Burnt Ground.

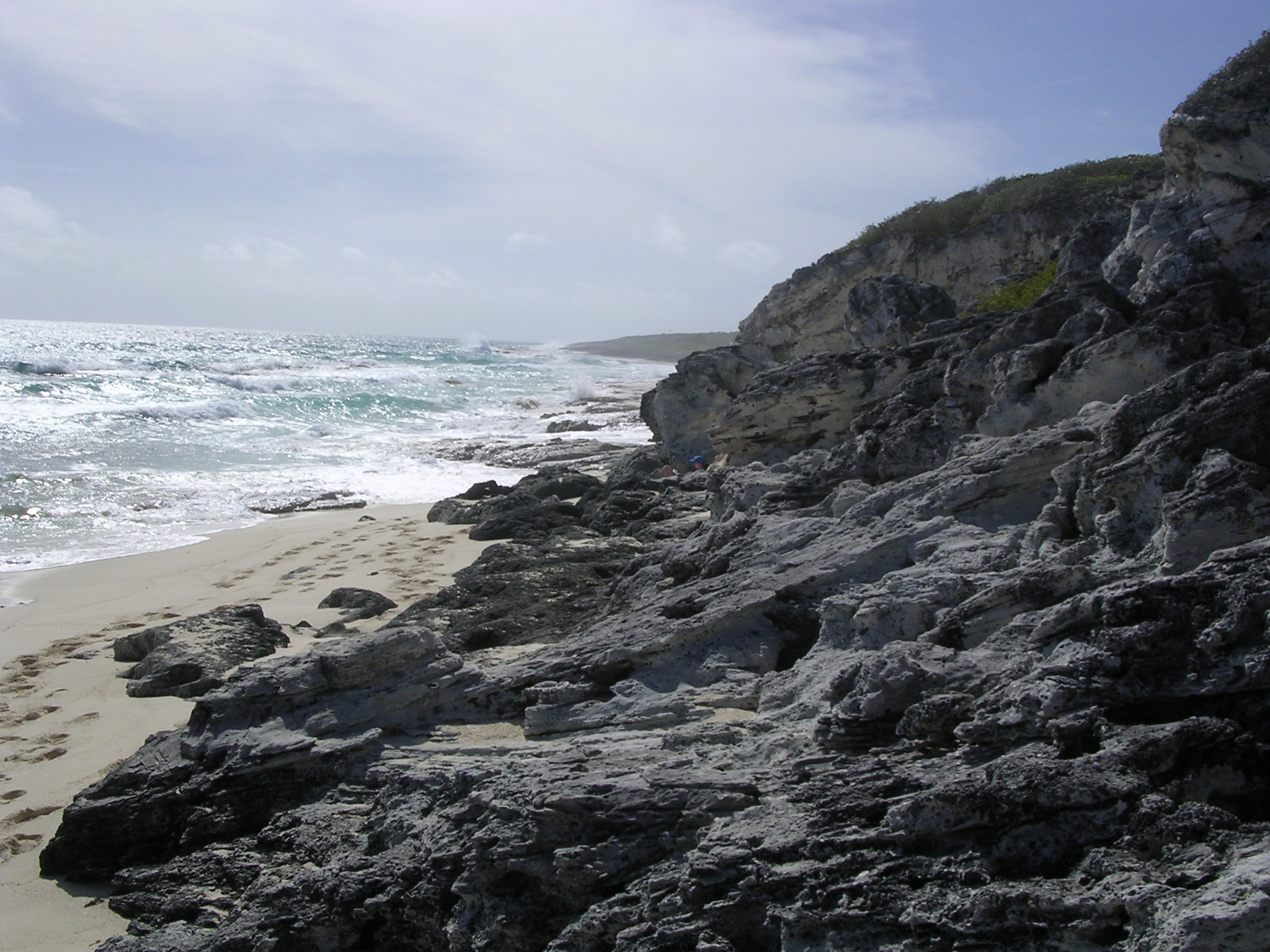
Windward shore of Long Island, The Bahamas.

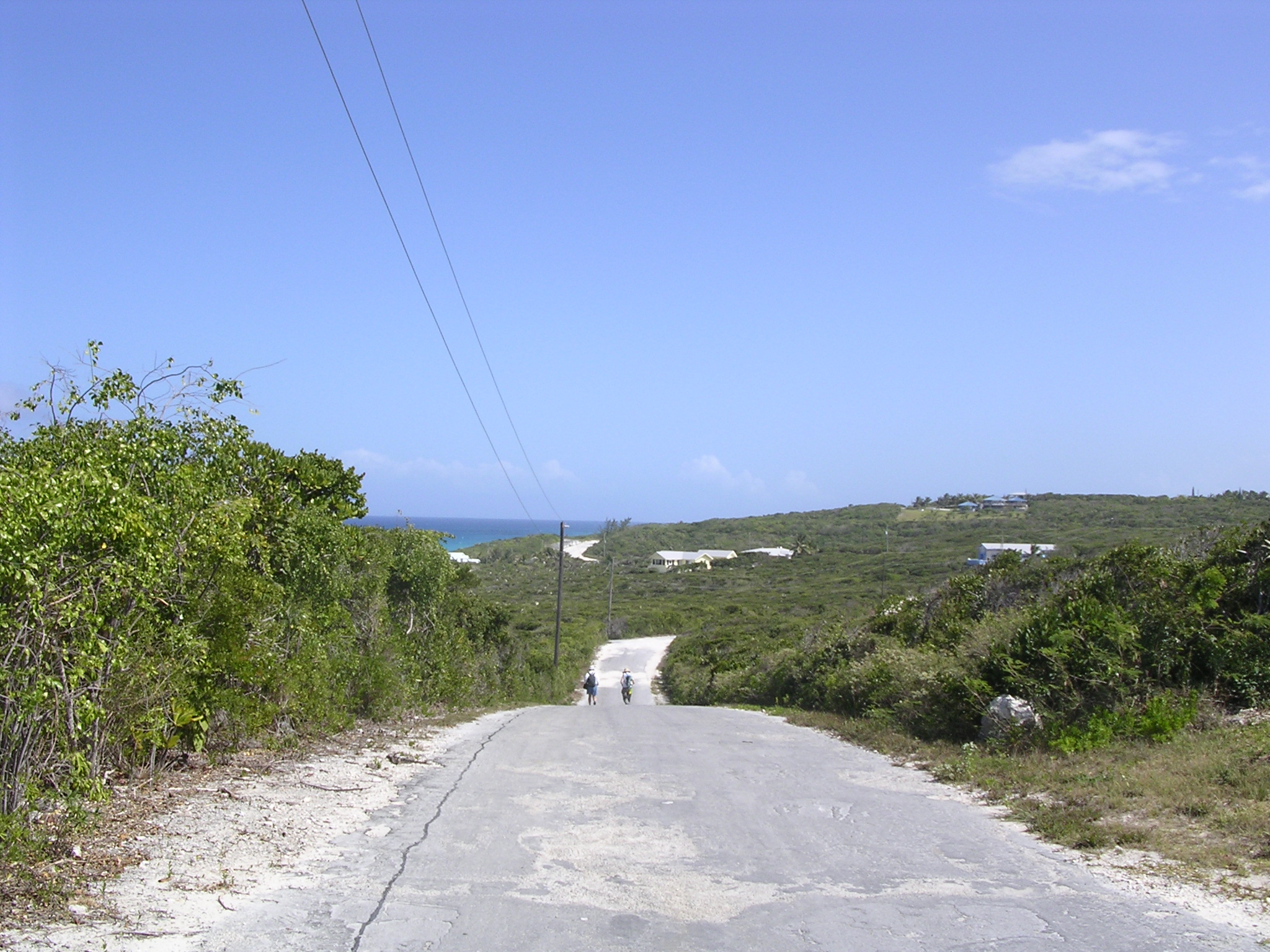
Road on Long Island, The Bahamas.

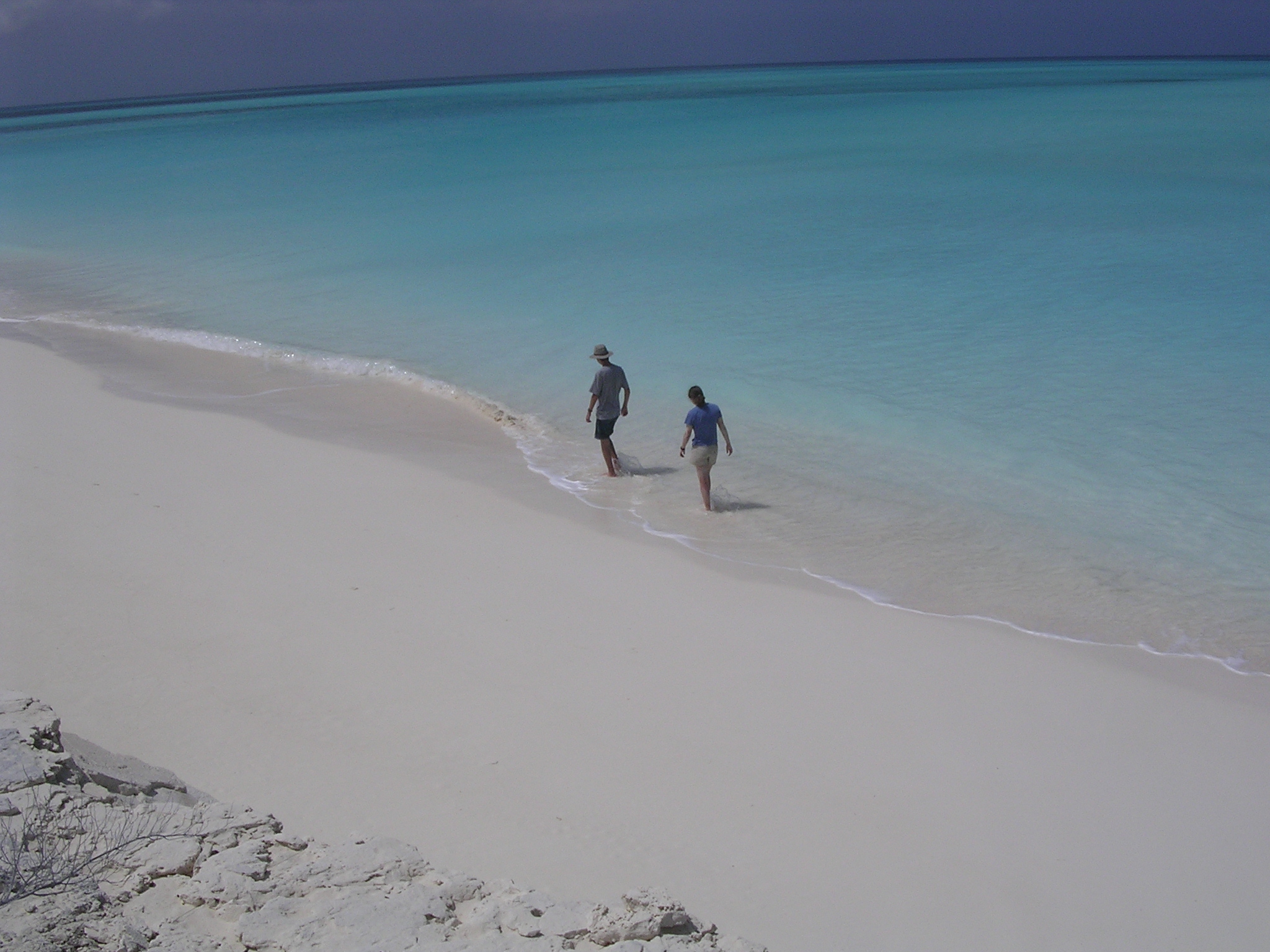
Lee shore beach on Long Island, The Bahamas.

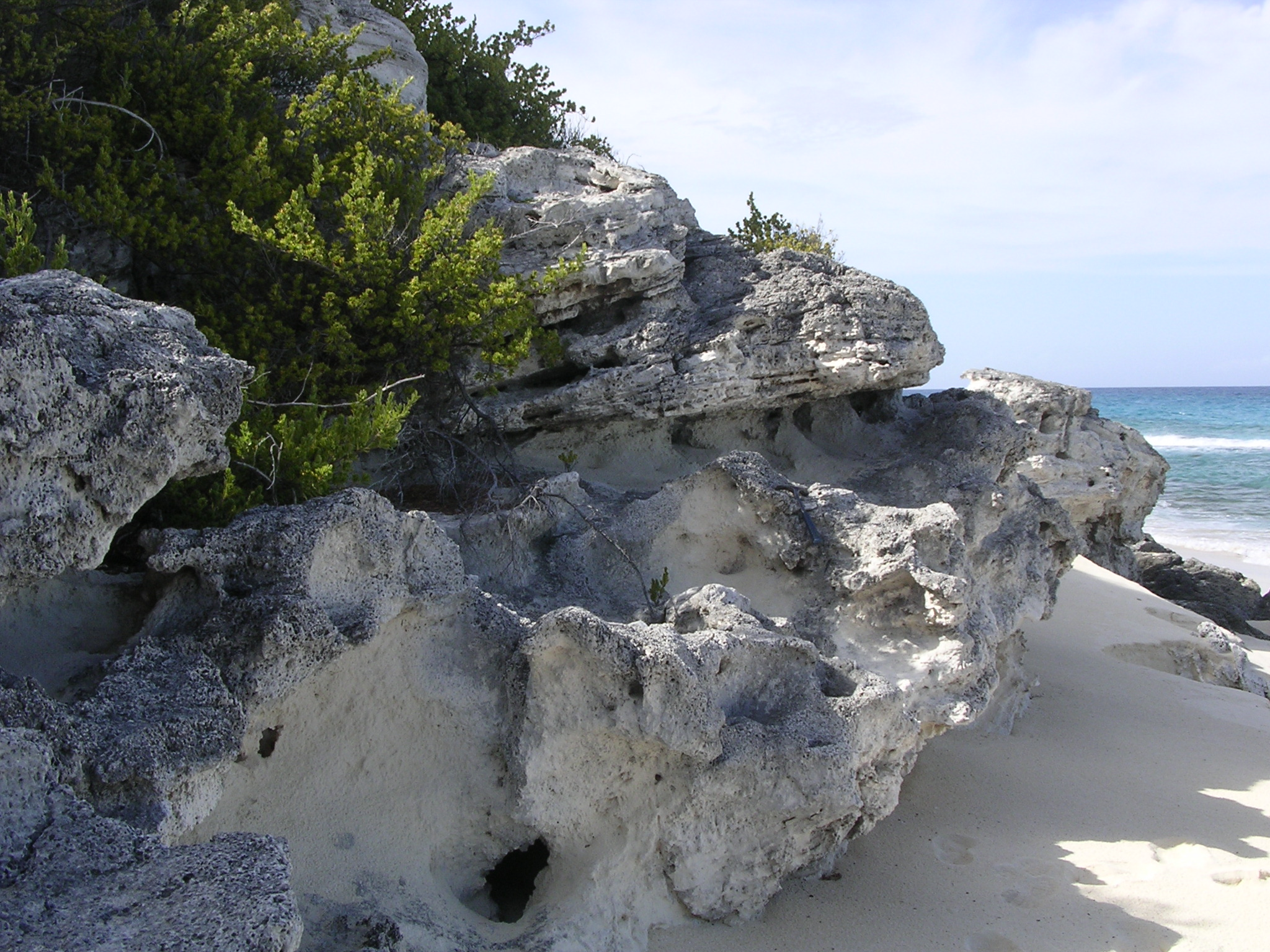
Holocene eolianite on Long Island, The Bahamas.

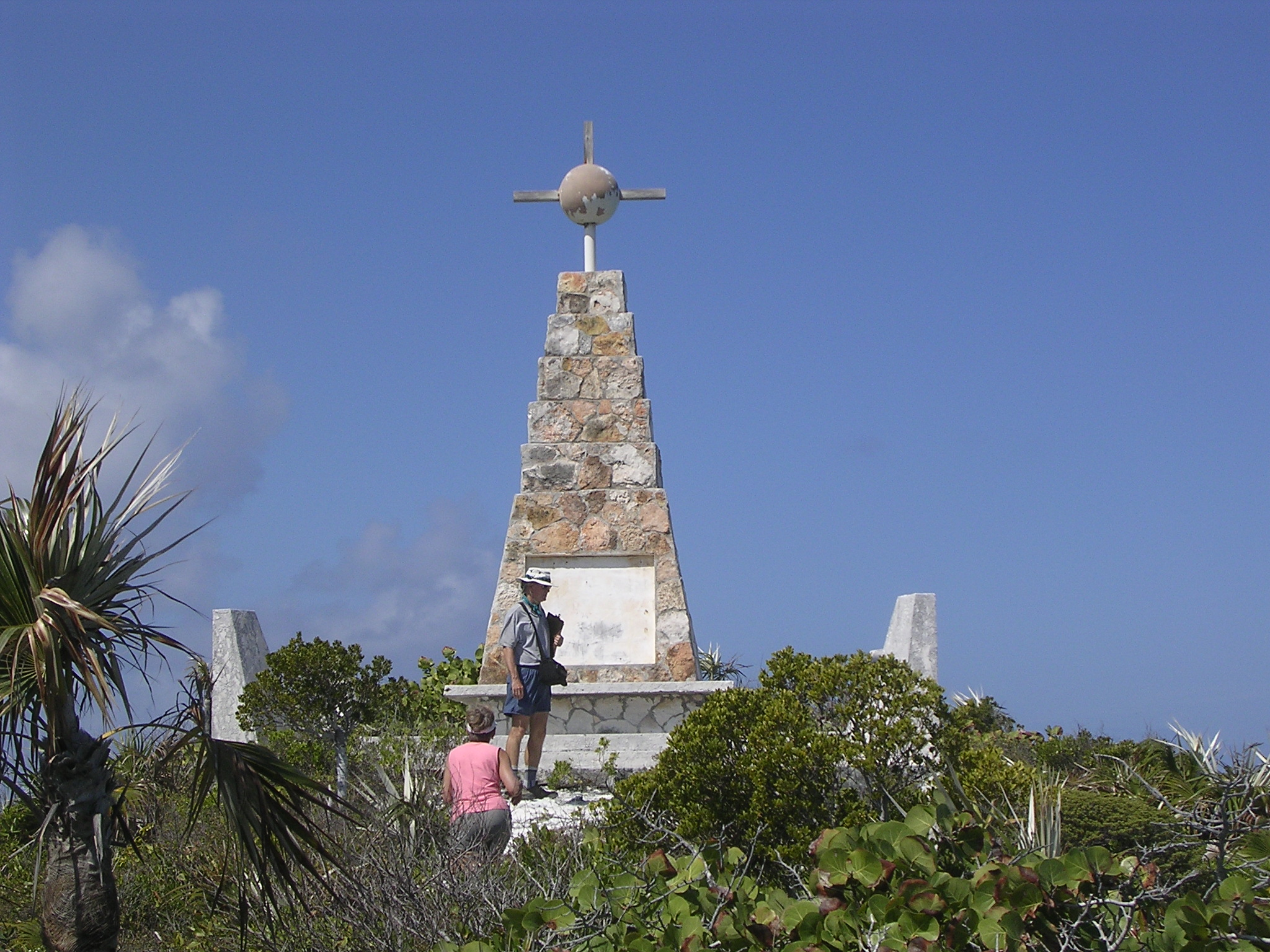
Columbus Monument on Long Island, The Bahamas.

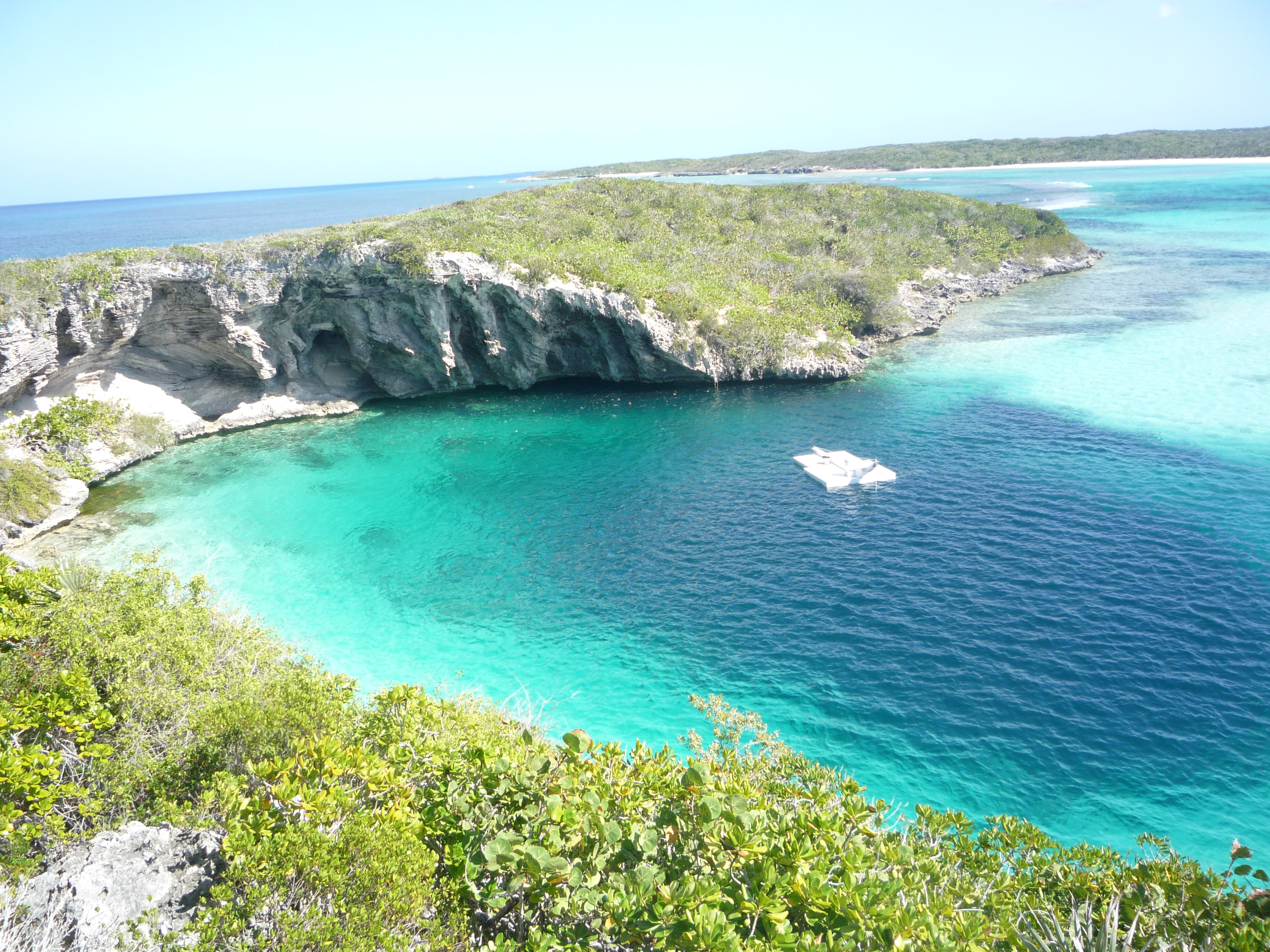
The Dean's Blue Hole.

== Politics ==
For elections to the Parliament of the Bahamas, it is part of the Long Island constituency.

== See also ==
- Bahama Banks
- Geography of the Bahamas
- History of the Bahamas
- List of islands of the Bahamas
- Lucayan Archipelago
- Out Islands
- Voyages of Christopher Columbus
