= Underwater photography =

Genre of photography

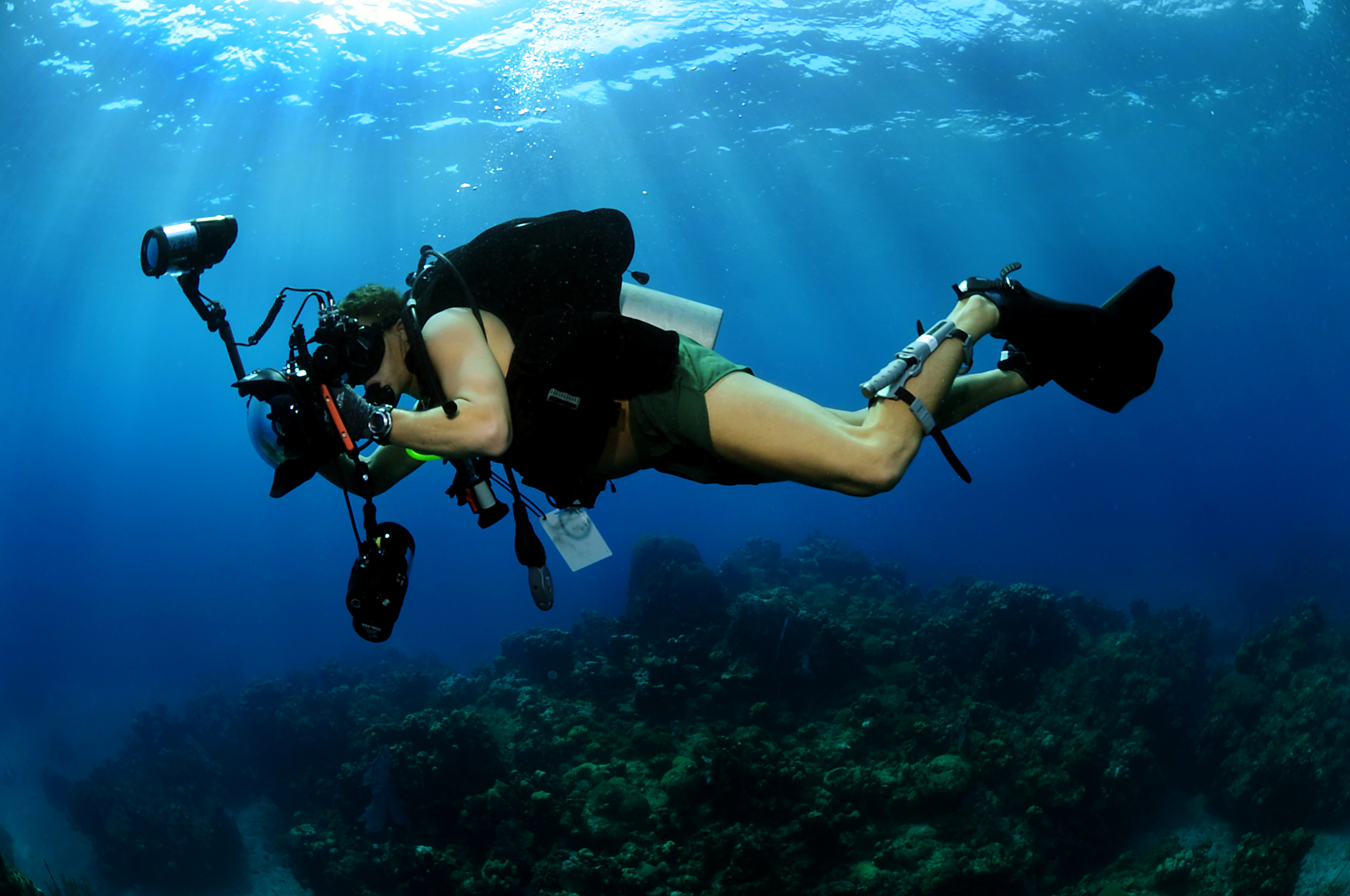
A United States Navy Mass Communication Specialist conducting underwater photography training

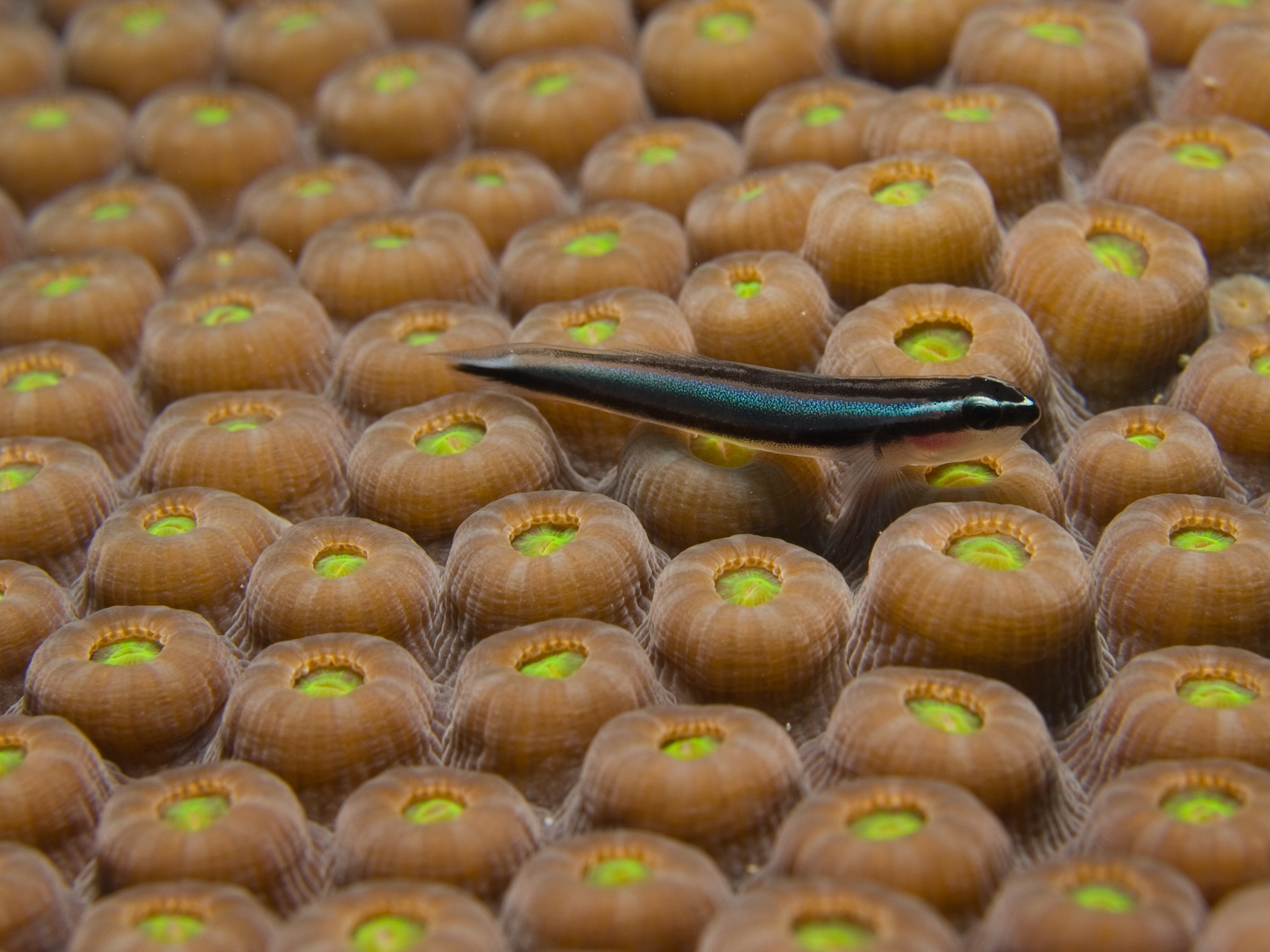
Neon goby (Elacatinus oceanops) swimming over a great star coral (Montastraea cavernosa)

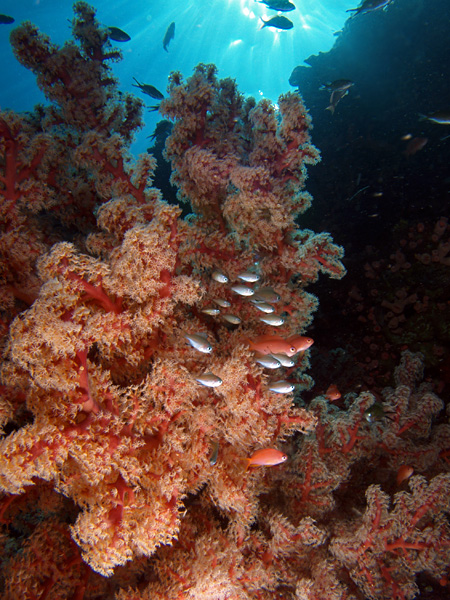
Wide-angle shot of coral reef in East Timor

Underwater photography is the practice of capturing images beneath the surface of the water, often done while scuba diving, but can also be done while diving on surface supply, snorkeling, swimming, from a submersible or remotely operated underwater vehicle, or from automated cameras lowered from the surface.

Underwater photography can also be categorized as an art form and a method for recording data. Successful underwater imaging is usually done with specialized equipment and techniques. However, it offers exciting and rare photographic opportunities. Animals such as fish and marine mammals are common subjects, but photographers also pursue shipwrecks, submerged cave systems, underwater "landscapes", invertebrates, seaweeds, geological features, and portraits of fellow divers.

== Equipment ==
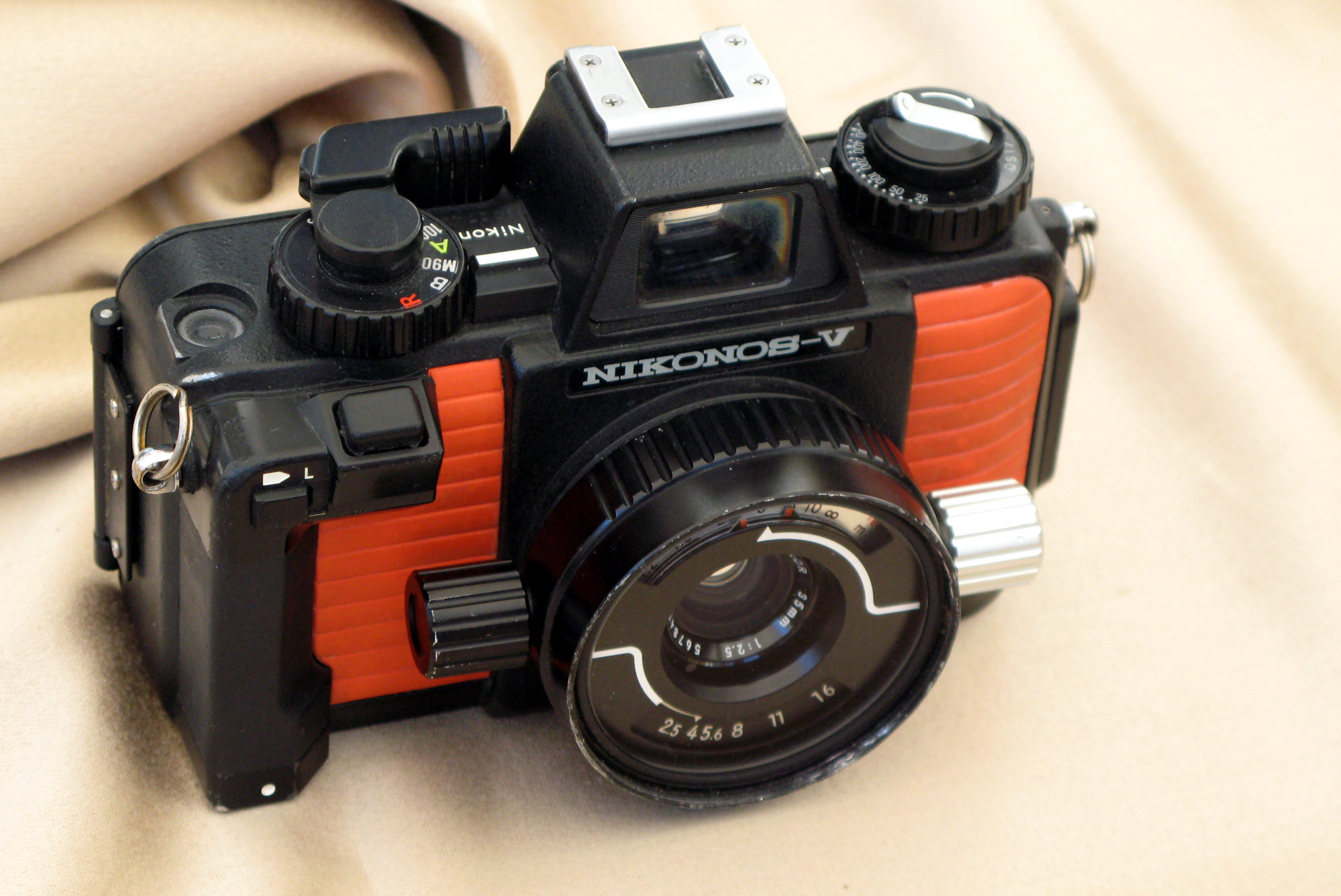
A Nikonos V amphibious camera

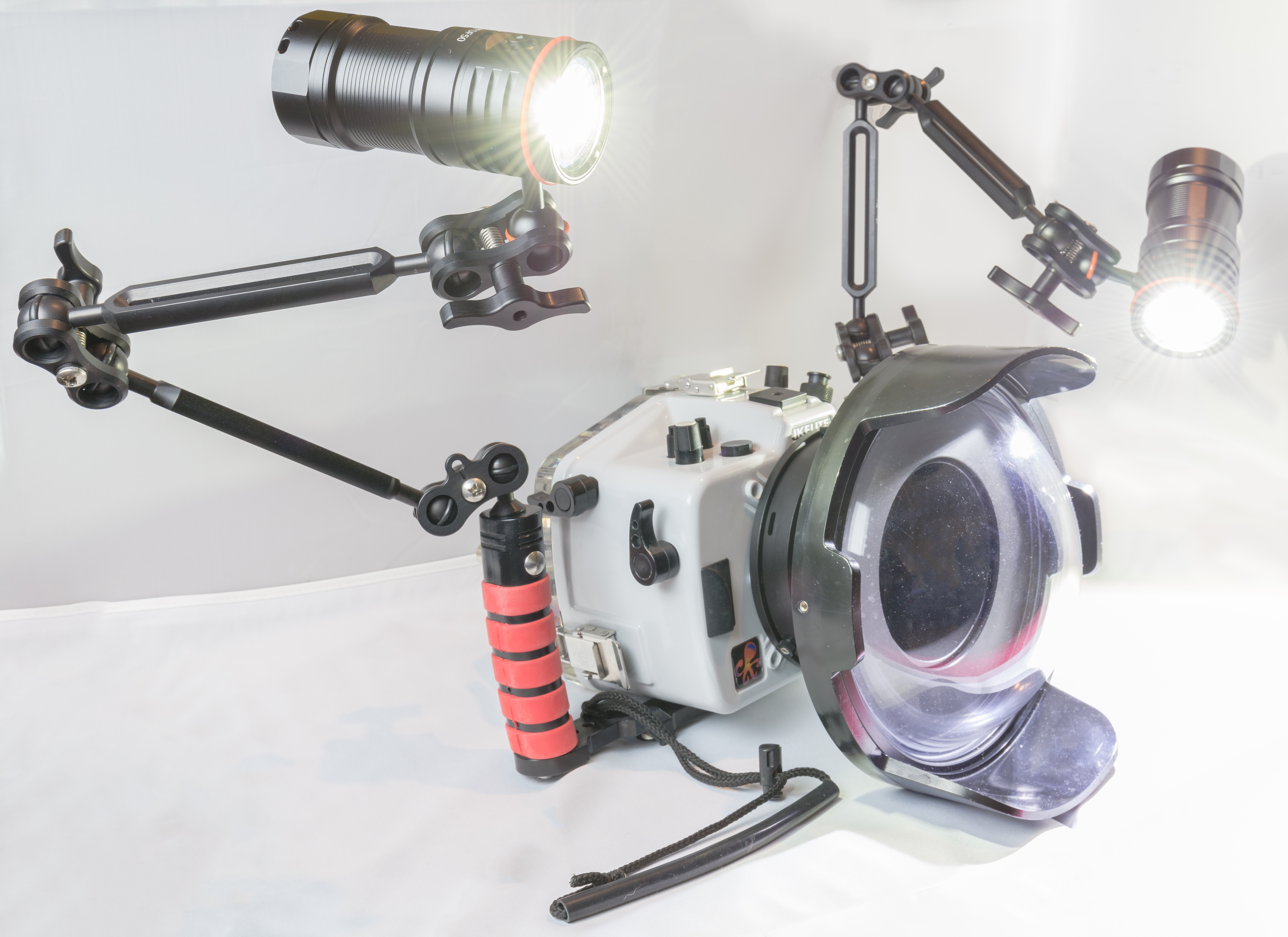
Underwater housing for SLR with dome port, arms and lights

Some cameras are made for use underwater, including modern waterproof digital cameras. The first amphibious camera was the Calypso, reintroduced as the Nikonos in 1963. The Nikonos range was designed specifically for use underwater. Nikon ended the Nikonos series in 2001 and its use has declined, as has that of other 35mm film systems. Sea and Sea USA made the Motor Marine III, an amphibious range-finder camera for 35mm film.

=== Underwater housings ===
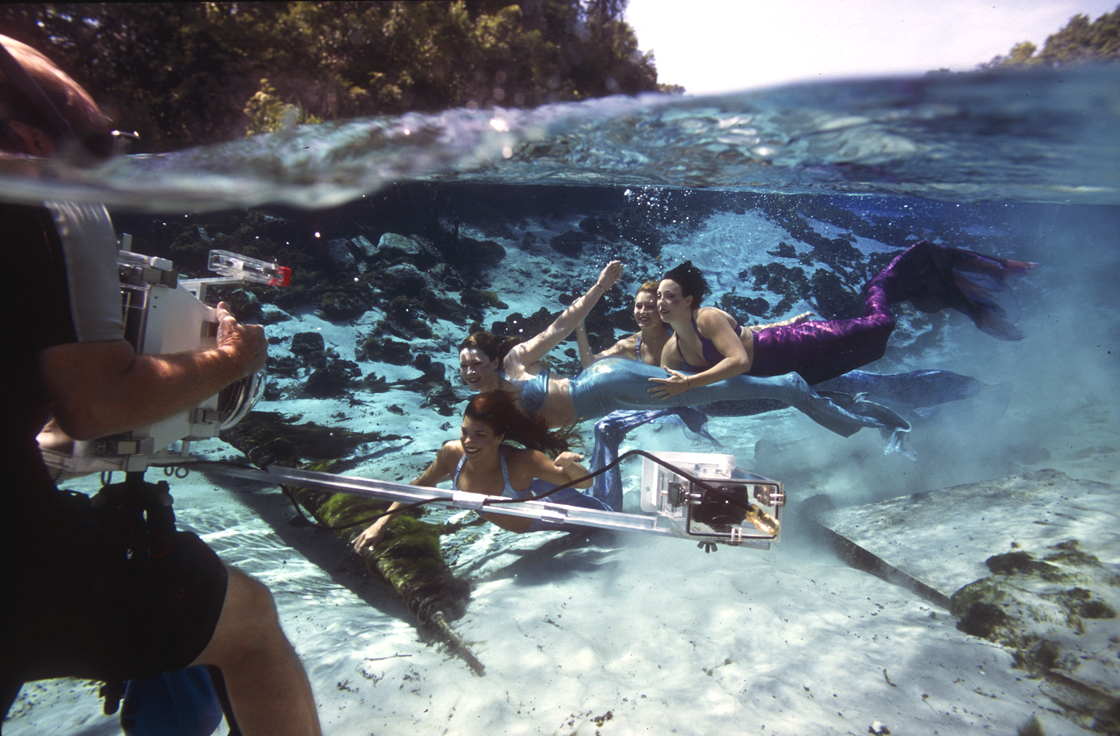
A waterproof camera and waterproof light source setup for professional underwater photography

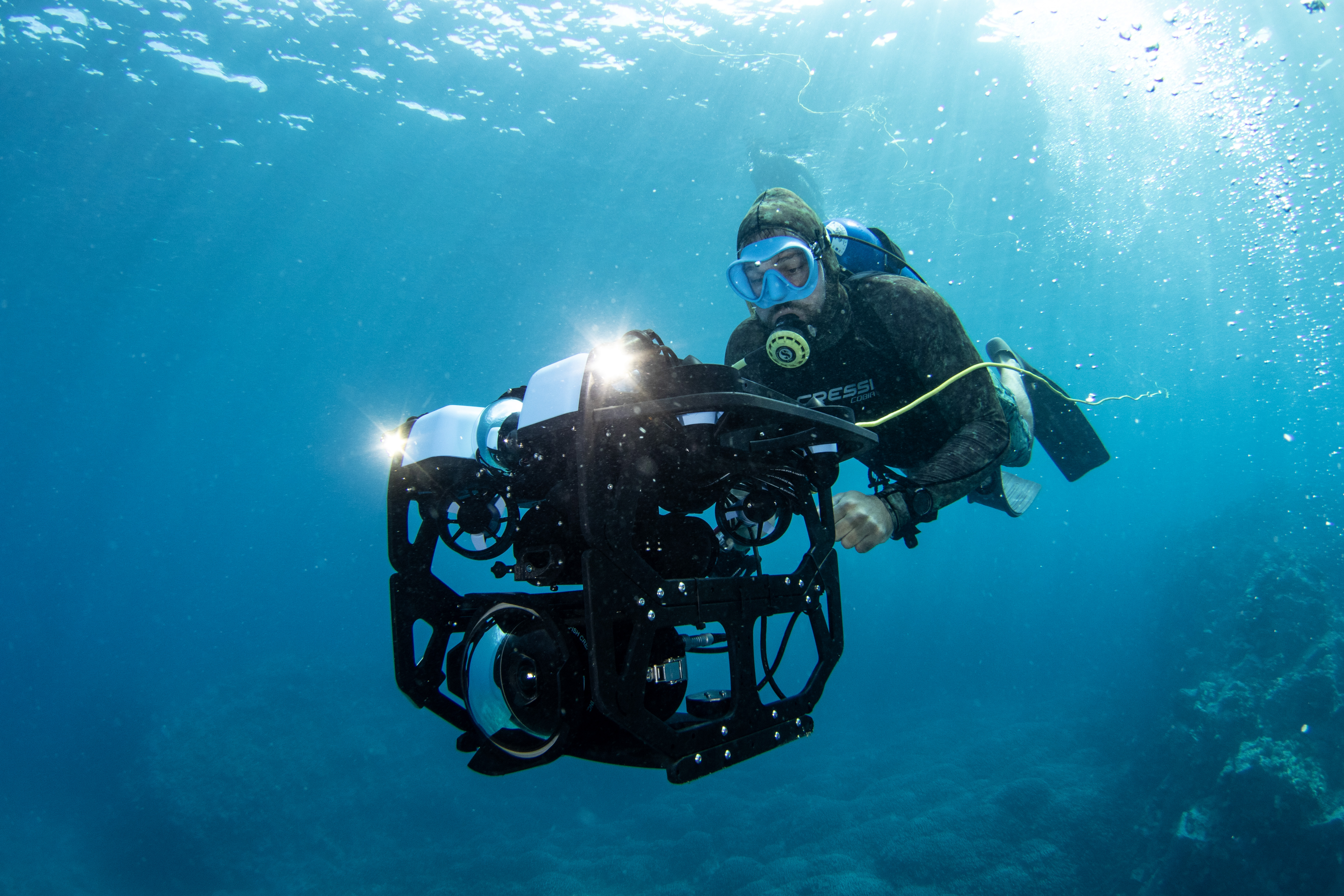
A BlueROV2 equipped with a Panasonic Lumix BGH1 4K Cinema Camera with a Lumix 7-14mm lens

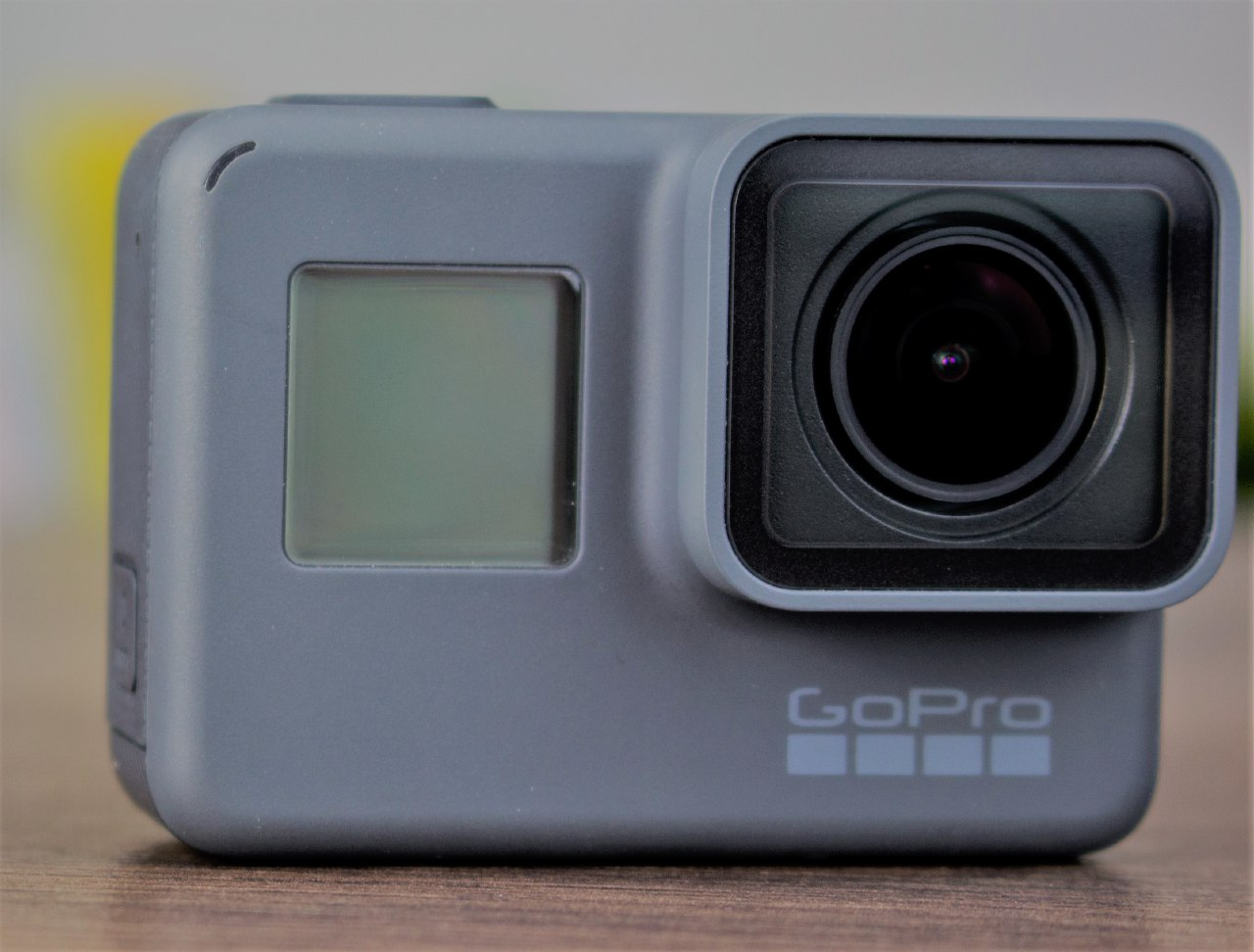
GoPro Hero5 action camera in underwater housing

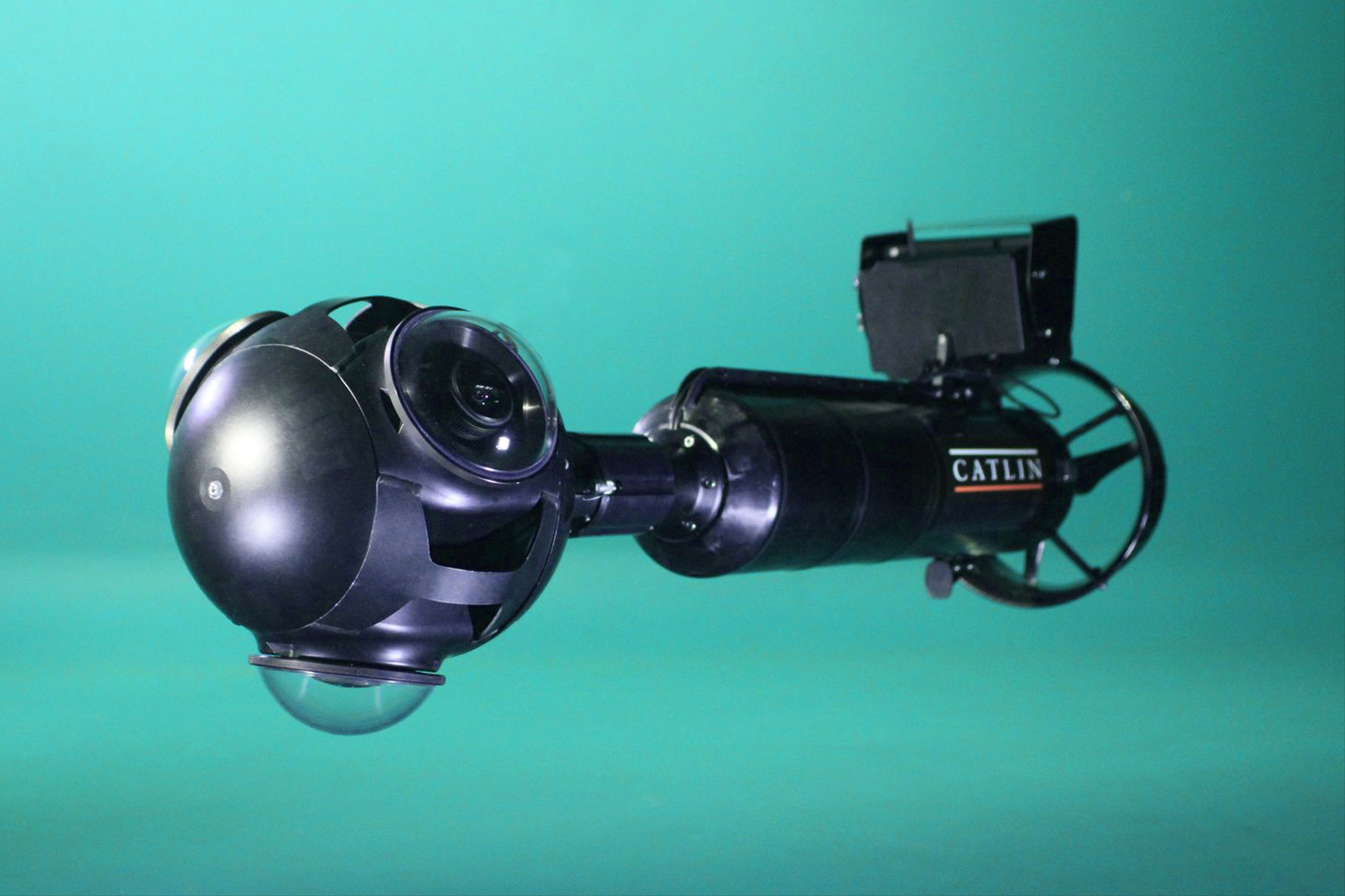
Seaview SVII Camera using three dome ports for all round view

Cameras made for dry work can also work underwater, protected by add-on housings, which are made for point and shoot cameras, compact cameras with full exposure controls, single lens reflex cameras (SLRs), and mirrorless cameras. Most such housings are specific to the camera model. Materials range from relatively inexpensive injection molded plastic to higher-priced die-cast or machined from solid aluminum. Housings allow many options: users can choose housings specific to their everyday "land" cameras and use any lens, provided that it fits or they use the appropriate lens port accessory. Underwater photographers generally use wide-angle lenses or macro lenses, both of which allow close focus and therefore a shorter distance to the subject, which reduces the loss of clarity to scattering.

Digital media can hold many more shots than standard film (which rarely has more than 36 frames per roll). This gives digital cameras an advantage, since it is impractical to change film underwater. Other comparisons between digital and film photography also apply, and the use of film under water has declined, as it has on land. It is also not possible to change regular lenses underwater, though some wet connectable telephoto, fisheye and macro extensions are available for some housings.

Underwater housings have control knobs and buttons that reach the camera inside, allowing use of most of its normal functions. These housings may also have connectors to attach external flash units. Some basic housings allow the use of the flash on the camera, but the on-board flash may not be powerful enough or properly placed for underwater use. More-advanced housings either redirect the on-board strobe to fire a slave strobe via a fiber-optic cable, or physically prevent the use of the on-board strobe. Housings are made waterproof by silicone or other elastomer O-rings at the closures and where control spindles and pushbuttons pass through the housing. High-end housings may use double O-rings on many of the critical pushbuttons and spindles to reduce the risk of leaks, which can destroy the electronics in cameras. Some cameras are inherently waterproof, or submersible to shallow depths; when these are in submersible housings, the consequences of a small leak are generally not serious.

There are optical problems with using cameras inside a watertight housing. Because of refraction, the image coming through the glass port will be distorted, especially with wide-angle lenses. A dome-shaped or fish-eye port corrects this distortion. Most manufacturers make these dome ports for their housings, often designing them to be used with specific lenses to maximize their effectiveness.

The Nikonos series allowed the use of water-contact optics—lenses designed to be used submerged, without the ability to focus correctly when used in air. There is also a problem with some digital cameras, which do not have sufficiently wide lenses built in; to solve this, there are housings made with supplementary optics in addition to the dome port, making the apparent angle of view wider. Some housings work with wet-coupled lenses, which are screwed on to the outside of the lens port and increase the field of view; these lenses may be added or removed under water, allowing both macro and wide-angle photography on the same dive.

With macro lenses, the distortion caused by refraction is not a problem, so normally a simple flat glass port is used. Refraction through a flat port increases the magnification of a macro lens; this is considered a benefit to photographers who are trying to capture very small subjects. Digital cameras may have several user selectable or programmable modes, which may include modes specifically for underwater use.

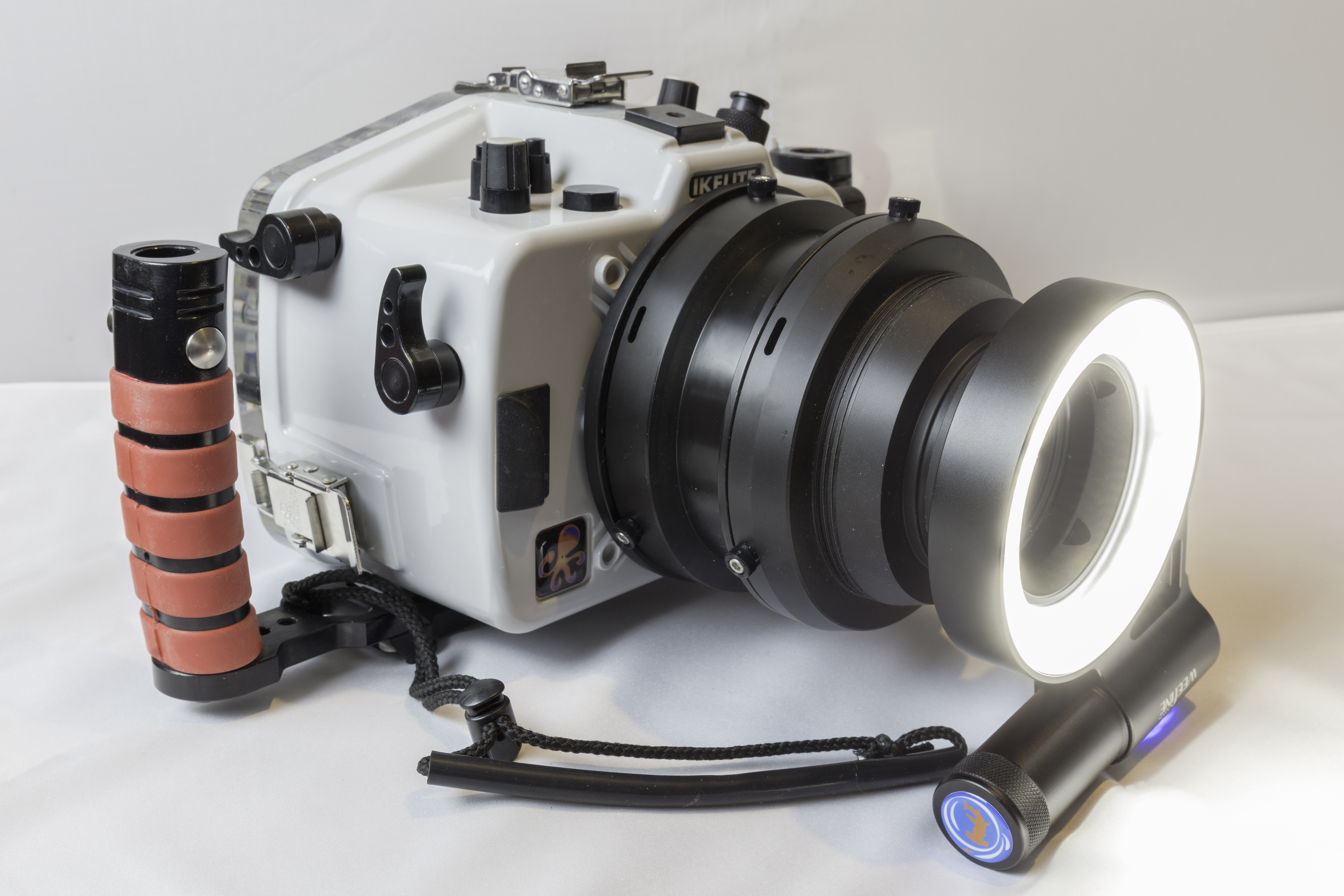
Underwater housing for SLR with port extension, flat port and ring light

Buoyancy of the housing may have to be adjusted by adding ballast or buoyancy chambers. Ideally these should be incompressible at working depth range so the buoyancy remains constant throughout the dive, and can be set with considerable precision. Most divers can manage a small divergence from neutral buoyancy, but a large divergence can make it difficult to hold the camera in place with one hand, which can often be useful, particularly with point and shoot cameras. When photographing on breath-hold, it is convenient if the camera will float back to the surface if dropped. On scuba it may be more convenient if it does not float away.

==== Smartphone housings ====
Underwater housings for smartphones are available with a variety of depth ratings and features. These can be less expensive than dedicated underwater photography cameras. The simplest form is a waterproof pouch, best used for shallow-water photography.

Some smartphone housings are limited by operating system. Others are compatible with almost any phone that will physically fit into the housing, but require Bluetooth and an app enabling the phone to communicate with the housing. Wireless communication allows the housing to be made with only one opening hull penetration and no moving parts penetrating the camera compartment. Some housings are pumped down to a near vacuum after sealing, which secures the cover and allows the seal to be tested before entering the water. Some (like the Diveroid Universal Lite) use physical capacitive buttons that interact with the touch screen.

=== Camera formats ===
Most types of digital camera have some underwater application. Those commonly seen in use are the models for which stock underwater housings are available, or which are inherently waterproof, such as rugged compact cameras, which may be used at shallow depths without a housing, but have housings available for greater depths.

- Compacts, rugged compacts and bridge cameras have great versatility regarding focal length, they tend to have a wide angle to telephoto lens with macro capabilities making these functions available without need to change lenses, which cannot be done during a dive. Although wet change accessories are available to increase or decrease focal length and for greater magnification, the 2020 generation rugged compacts already have inherent very close focus ability, and fairly wide angle low end of the focal length. Some of the rugged compact cameras will fit into a large dry suit or BC pocket in their underwater housing, though not usually with an external strobe or video light, allowing a diver to conveniently carry the camera on a working dive in case it may be useful, or for a larger format photographer to carry it as a backup, or for opportunities where the main camera has an unsuitable lens fitted.
- Action cameras are popular with divers who want a record of the dive, but not the task loading of operating the camera controls. The camera can be hand held for versatility, or can be head mounted for first person view, or mounted on other equipment, like a diver propulsion vehicle.
- Mirrorless interchangeable-lens cameras and Digital single-lens reflex cameras have very similar ranges of applications, mostly for high end work, where the photographer wants the best possible image quality, and has the skills and desire to put in the necessary effort and accepts the limitations of being stuck with the same lens throughout the dive, and managing bulky equipment. These formats are almost always used with large external lighting systems which are needed in most circumstances to get the best results. A relatively large capital investment in equipment is associated with the format.

== Lighting ==
Graph of light absorption coefficient of pure water

Lighting for underwater photography has several aspects. There may be insufficient natural light to take a photo, in many cases the natural light has lost a significant part of the spectrum, or the photographer wishes to emphasize contrast between foreground and background. Where flash is used for the actual photograph, auxiliary light may be necessary or desirable to facilitate composition and focusing in low light conditions. Many digital cameras have video options, which require a steady light source, and in some cases a single video light can provide all these functions, and also serve as an adequate dive light for non-photographic applications.

The primary obstacle faced by underwater photographers is the loss of color and contrast when submerged to any significant depth. One issue faced is light attenuation. The longer wavelengths of sunlight (such as red or orange) are absorbed quickly by the surrounding water, so even to the naked eye everything appears blue-green. The loss of color increases not only vertically through the water column, but also horizontally, so subjects farther away from the camera also appear colorless and indistinct. This effect occurs in apparently clear water, such as that found around tropical coral reefs.

Underwater photographers solve this problem by combining two techniques. The first is to get the camera as close to the photographic subject as possible, minimizing the horizontal loss of color. Many serious underwater photographers consider any more than about one yard or meter unacceptable. The second technique is the use of a flash or video lights to restore colour lost to depth. Fill flash, used effectively, "paints" in missing colors by providing full-spectrum visible light to the overall exposure.

Another environmental effect is range of visibility. The water is seldom optimally clear, and the dissolved and suspended matter can reduce visibility by both absorption and scattering of light.

=== Underwater flash ===
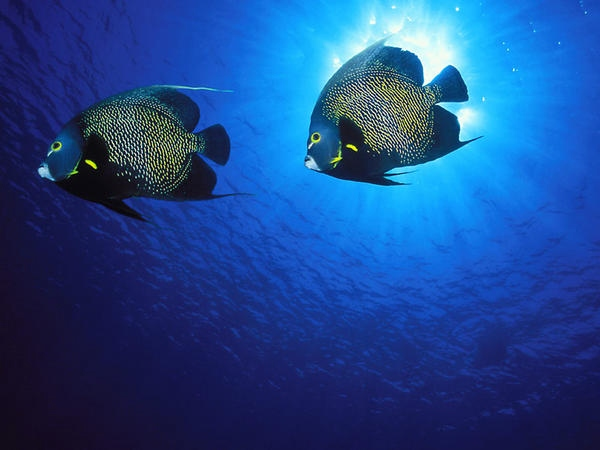
Wide-angle image of French angelfish with proper balance between flash and sunlight

The use of a flash or strobe is often regarded as the most difficult aspect of underwater photography. Some misconceptions exist about the proper use of flash underwater, especially as it relates to wide-angle photography. Generally, the flash should be used to supplement the overall exposure and to restore lost color, not as the primary light source. In situations such as the interior of caves or shipwrecks, wide-angle images can be 100% strobe light, but such situations are fairly rare. Usually, the photographer tries to create an aesthetic balance between the available sunlight and the strobe. Deep, dark or low visibility environments can make this balance more difficult, but the concept remains the same. Many modern cameras have simplified this process through various automatic exposure modes and the use of through-the-lens (TTL) metering. The increasing use of digital cameras has reduced the learning curve of underwater flash significantly, since the user can instantly review photos and make adjustments.

Color is absorbed as it travels through water, so that the deeper the observer, the less reds, oranges and yellow colors remain. The strobe replaces that color. It also helps to provide shadow and texture, and is a valuable tool for creativity.

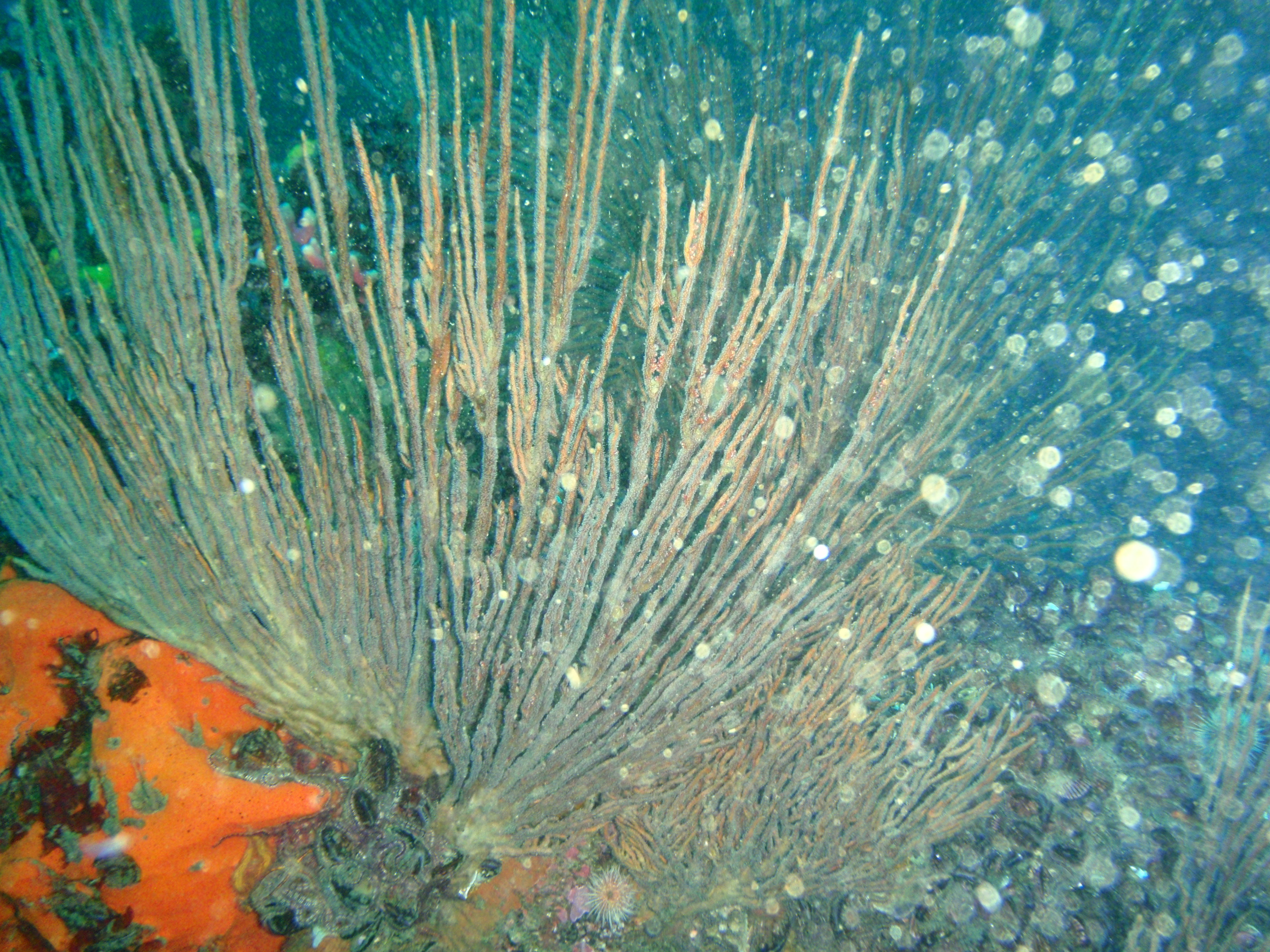
Underwater photograph using internal flash illustrating backscatter

An added complication is the phenomenon of backscatter, where the flash reflects off particles in the water. These particles show up in the final shot as bright dots. Even seemingly clear water contains enormous amounts of these particulates, even if they not readily seen by the naked eye. The best technique for avoiding backscatter is positioning the strobe away from the axis of the camera lens. Ideally, this means the flash will not light up the particulates in water directly in front of the lens, but will still illuminate the subject. Various systems of jointed arms and attachments are used to make off-camera strobes easier to manipulate.

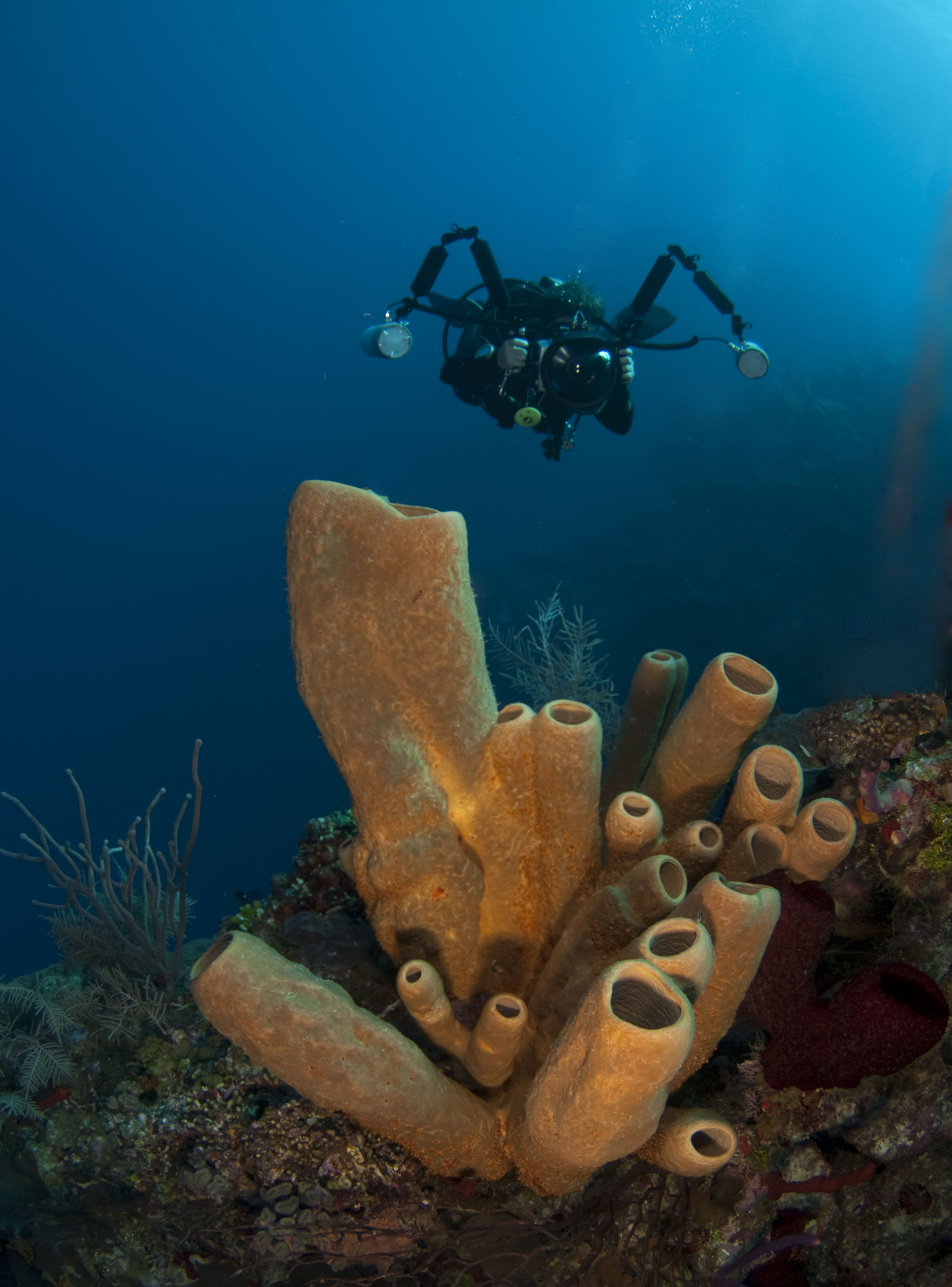
Strobes positioned to reduce backscatter

When using macro lenses, photographers are much more likely to use 100% strobe light for the exposure. The subject is normally very close to the lens, and the available ambient light is usually not sufficient.

There have been some attempts to avoid the use of artificial light entirely, but these have mostly failed. In shallow water, the use of custom white-balance provides excellent color without the use of strobe. In theory one could use color filters to overcome the blue-green shift, but this can be problematic. The amount of shift varies with depth and turbidity, and there would still be a significant loss of contrast. Many digital cameras have settings that will provide color balance, but this can cause other problems. For example, an image shifted toward the "warm" part of the spectrum can create background water which appears gray, purple or pink, and looks unnatural. There have been some successful experiments using filters combined with the raw image format function on some high-end digital cameras, allowing more detailed manipulation in the digital darkroom. This approach will probably always be restricted to shallower depths, where the loss of color is less extreme. In spite of that, it can be effective for large subjects such as shipwrecks which could not be lit effectively with strobes.

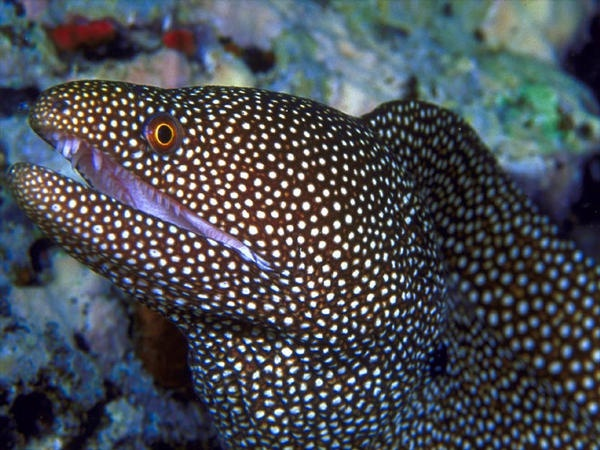
Macro image of a Whitemouth Moray Eel using 100% flash for the exposure

Natural light photography underwater can be beautiful when done properly with subjects such as upward silhouettes, light beams, and large subjects such as whales and dolphins.

Although digital cameras have revolutionized many aspects of underwater imaging, it is unlikely that flash will ever be eliminated. From an aesthetic standpoint, the flash emphasizes the subject and helps separate it from the blue background, especially in deeper water. Ultimately the loss of color and contrast is a pervasive optical problem that cannot always be adjusted in software such as Photoshop.

==== Snoot ====
A snoot is a tube used to direct the illumination from the flash or other light source to a very restricted area, strongly illuminating the area of focus and leaving the surroundings relatively dark. It is used to selectively illuminate the subject to give dark backgrounds and a brightly lit subject. It is easier to use if the flash has an integral modeling light so the photographer can see how the illumination will be distributed during exposure. A snoot with the opening placed close to the subject at an angle can virtually eliminate backscatter.

=== Modeling lights ===
A modeling light is a low intensity light used to compose the picture when flash is intended for illumination. It allows a better view of the subject for focusing and framing the shot, but does not provide enough light to interfere with the flash illumination. Some flash units have integral modeling lights with an aluminum funnel and flash unit to direct the angle in which the light is exerted in. otherwise a diffuse low power dive light may work well for close up work.

=== Video lights ===
A video light is a powerful light source used primarily for shooting video in environments with insufficient natural light, but can also be used as the primary light source for still photography. Placement of the video light follows the same recommendations as for flash photography, with the advantage that the illumination can be clearly seen and assessed before exposure. Considerably more energy is required for constant illumination in comparison with flash, and this method is best suited to cameras with sufficiently sensitive CCDs and for close up work. Another advantage is that the video light provides good illumination for general diving purposes. Video lights with adjustable intensity can be even more versatile. Video lights tend to be mounted similarly to flash. The intense light may disturb light sensitive animals, and they may react by retreating from the source. A large proportion of digital cameras have high definition video function, and video lights provide the option of switching between still and video using the same equipment.

== Split images ==
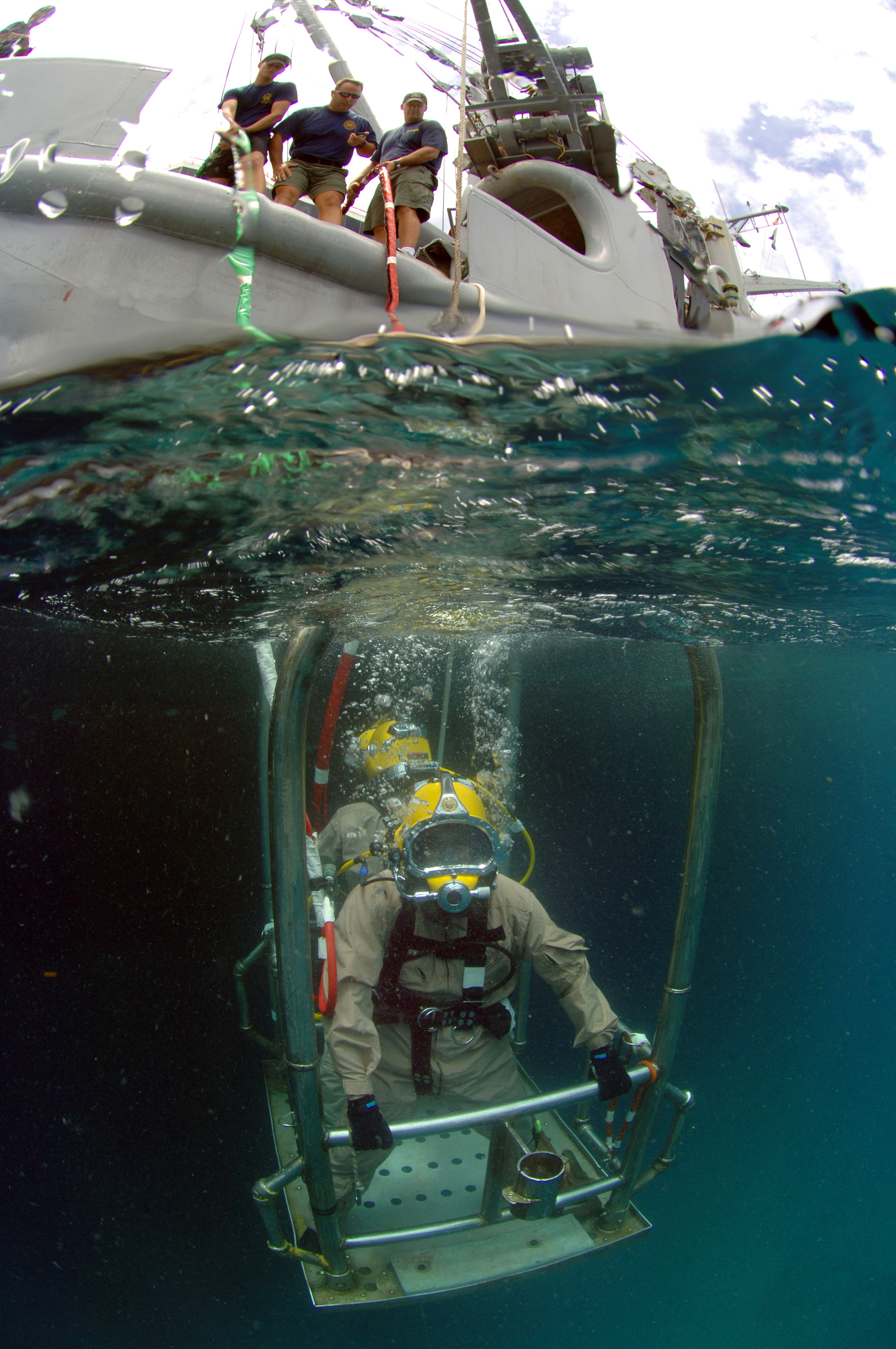
Split image showing surface-supplied divers riding a stage to the underwater workplace from a diving support vessel

Another format considered part of underwater photography is the over/under or split image, a composition that includes roughly half above the surface and half underwater, with both in focus. One of the pioneers of the traditional technique was National Geographic photographer David Doubilet, who used it to capture scenes above and below the surface simultaneously. Split images are popular in recreational scuba magazines, often showing divers swimming beneath a boat, or shallow coral reefs with the shoreline seen in the background.

Over/under shots present some technical challenges beyond the scope of most underwater camera systems. Normally an ultra wide angle lens is used, similar to the way it would be used in everyday underwater photography. However, the exposure value in the above water part of the image is often higher (brighter) than in the one underwater. There is also the problem of refraction in the underwater segment, and how it affects the overall focus in relation to the air segment. There are specialized split filters designed to compensate for both of these problems, as well as techniques for creating even exposure across the entire image.

However, professional photographers often use extremely wide or fisheye lenses that provide extensive depth of field – and a very small aperture for even more extensive depth of field; this is intended for acceptably sharp focus both on the nearby underwater subject and the more distant elements above water. An external flash can also be very useful underwater, on a low setting, to balance the light: to overcome the difference in brightness of the elements above and below the water.

Over/under photos necessitate the lens or port to be partly below and partly above the surface. When bringing the outer optical surface out of the water, droplets can be left on the surface which can distort the image. This can be avoided to some extent by wiping off the droplets with a chamois leather cloth above the water and lowering the camera to working position. Keeping the port fully wet is an alternative option, which requires the shot to be taken before the water on the top part of the lens surface separates into droplets. Which approach works better will depend on the surface tension of water on the lens surface.

David Doubilet explained his technique for split field images in an interview for Nikon Corporation. "You need to use a D-SLR and a super wide-angle or fisheye lens and a sophisticated housing that has a dome, not a flat port. Underwater images are magnified by 25 percent, and the dome will correct for that. The technique requires a small f/stop—f/16 or smaller—for great depth of field, plus a lens capable of close-focus; you always focus on the subject below the water line. You also have to balance the light. I look for a light bottom—white sand is best—or a light underwater subject. I'll put the strobes down below and light the bottom and then expose for the top. If you shoot at, say, ISO 400, you'll have plenty of exposure for the top, and the strobes will take care of the bottom. Of course, you need subjects that suit the technique."

Digital darkroom techniques can also be used to "merge" two images together, creating the appearance of an over/under shot.

== Applications ==
- Artistic photography, where the emotional impact on the viewer is a primary concern.
- Records of the condition of equipment and structures by commercial divers, where the purpose is to accurately present visible evidence of the condition of the subject.
- Records of the environment for personal and scientific purposes
  - Citizen science websites for recording biodiversity using underwater photographs as records, such as iNaturalist, Reef Life Survey, iSpot etc., use photography as a reliable source of objective data where the observer is not required to be recognized as an expert in identification of the subject, but is trusted to provide sufficiently accurate information regarding time, location, and similar meta-data. Recreational diver photographic coverage of the underwater environment is much more frequent than scientific research capacity for popular dive sites.

== Skills and training ==
Since underwater photography is often performed while scuba diving, it is important that the diver-photographer be sufficiently skilled so that it remains a reasonably safe activity. Good scuba technique also improves the quality of images, since marine life is less likely to be scared away by a calm diver, and the environment is less likely to be damaged or disturbed by a diver competent in buoyancy, trim, and maneuvering skills. There is the possibility of encountering poor conditions, such as heavy currents, tidal flow, or poor visibility. Underwater photographers usually try to avoid these situations if reasonably practicable, but in many cases the desired subject can only be accessed under less than ideal conditions and the photographer must deal with reality. Underwater diving training providers provide courses to help improve divers' diving skills and underwater photography skills. Good diving skills are necessary to avoid damaging the environment when maneuvering close to benthic subjects on reefs. Some underwater photographers have been implicated in reef damage.

== Scientific potential ==
Underwater photography has become more and more popular since the early 2000s, resulting on millions of pictures posted every year on various websites and social media. This mass of documentation is endowed with an enormous scientific potential, as millions of tourists possess a much superior coverage power than professional scientists, who can not allow themselves to spend so much time in the field. As a consequence, several participative sciences programs have been developed, supported by geo-localization and identification web sites (such as iNaturalist), along with protocols for auto-organization and self-teaching aimed at biodiversity-interested snorkelers, for them to turn their observations into sound scientific data, available for research. This kind of approach has been successfully used in Réunion island, allowing for tens of new records and even new species.

Scientists use underwater photography to examine objects on the sea floor over time, such as through quadrats.

== History ==
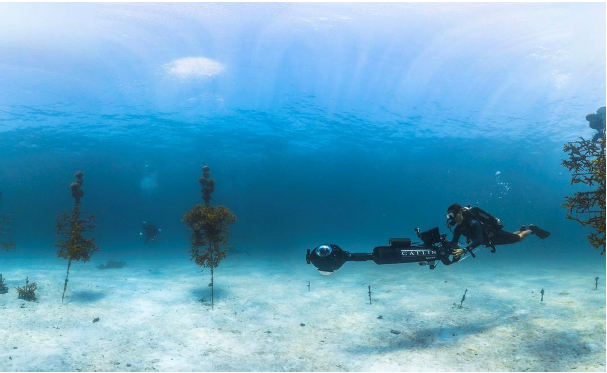
Scuba diver filmng a coral reef nursery at Florida Keys National Marine Sanctuary.

Underwater photography dates back to the early 20th century. Technological advancements, like the invention of the first waterproof camera housings and improvements in diving equipment, have made underwater photography more accessible. Today, digital cameras and advances in post-processing software have revolutionized underwater imaging, allowing photographers to capture high-resolution, color-rich images.

=== Timeline ===
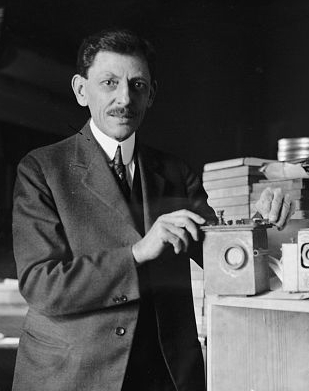
Paul Bartsch with underwater camera (1926)

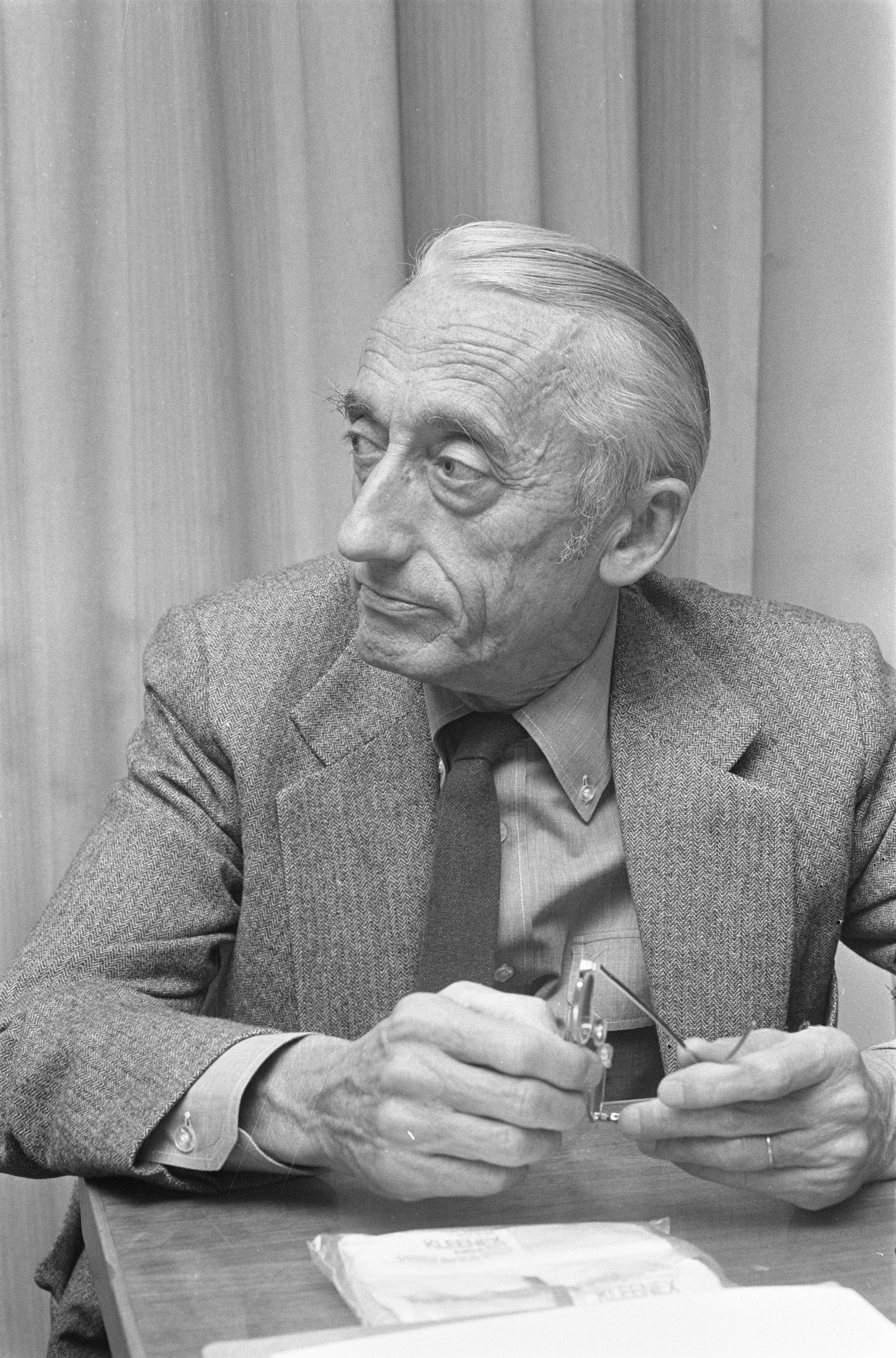
Jacques-Yves Cousteau, pioneer of scuba diving and underwater photography and film-making.

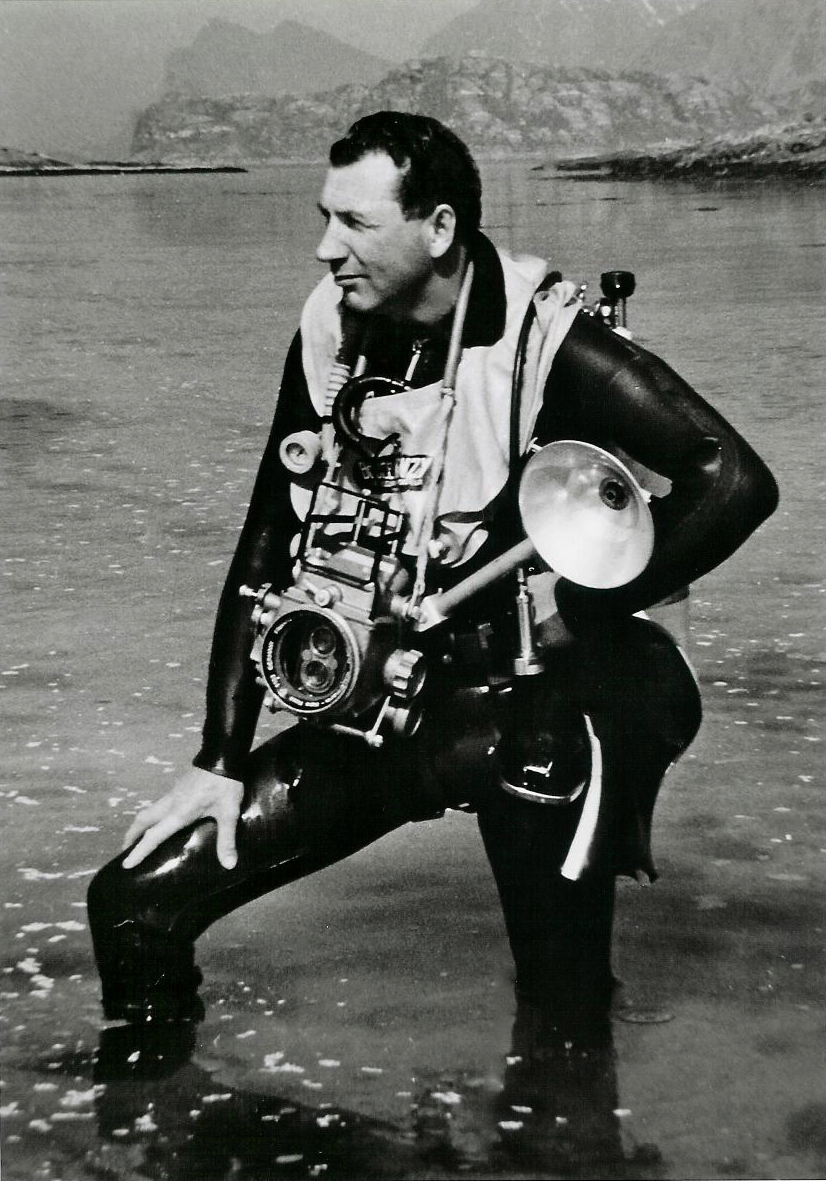
Norwegian diving pioneer Odd Henrik Johnsen with underwater camera (1960s)

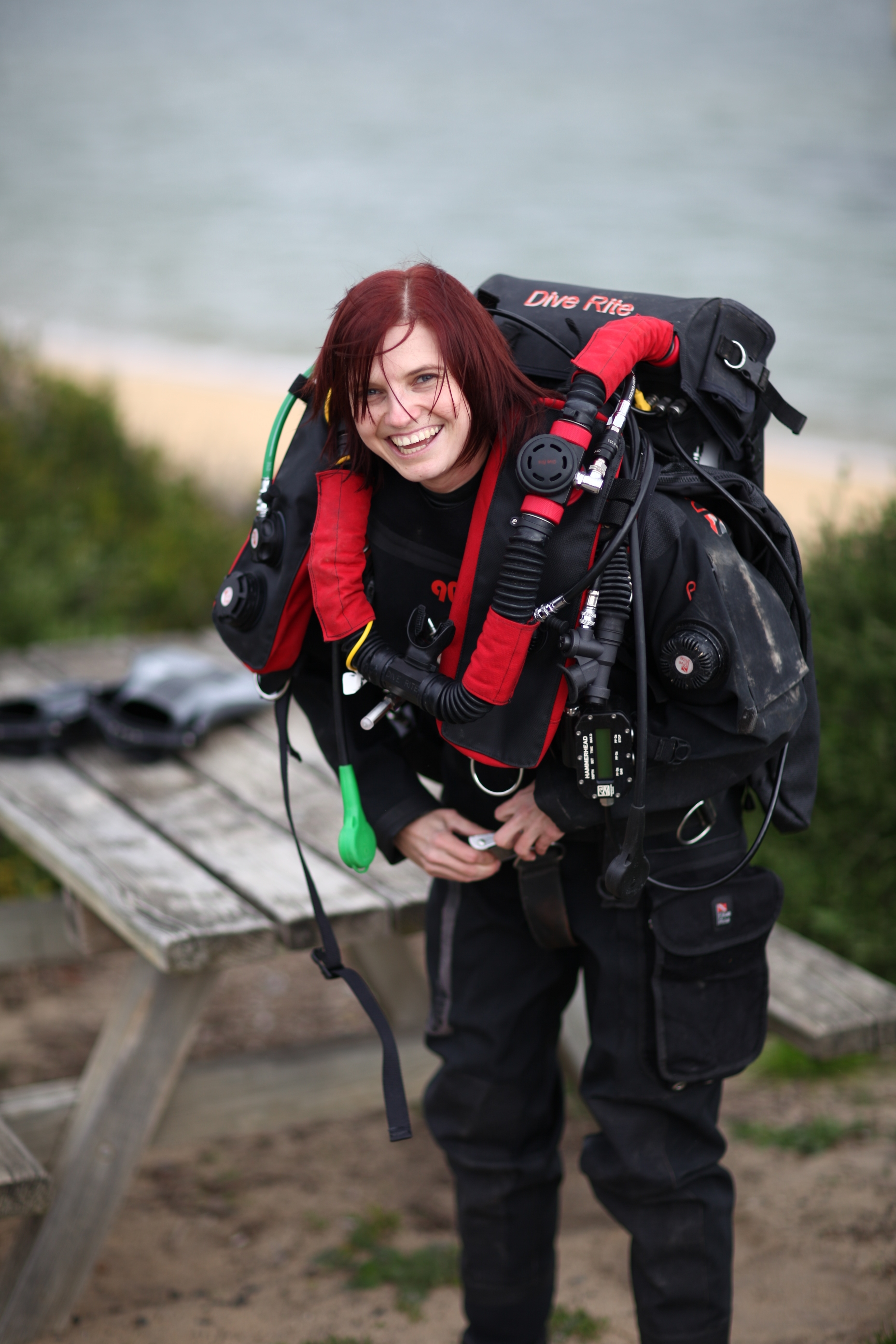
Agnes Milowka

- 1856 — William Thompson takes the first underwater pictures using a camera mounted on a pole.
- 1893 — Louis Boutan takes underwater pictures in Banyuls-sur-Mer while diving using surface supplied standard diving dress. He also develops an underwater flash and a remote control for deep waters using an electromagnet.
- 1914 — John Ernest Williamson shoots the first underwater motion picture in the Bahamas.
- 1926 — William Harding Longley and Charles Martin take the first underwater colour photos using a magnesium-powered flash.
- 1940 — Bruce Mozert begins to photograph at Silver Springs, Florida .
- 1948 — Development of the Rolleimarin medium format camera housing started on the request of Hans Hass.
- 1954 — The Rolleimarin housing first marketed.
- 1957 — The CALYPSO-PHOT camera is designed by Jean de Wouters and promoted by Jacques-Yves Cousteau. It is first released in Australia in 1963. It features a maximum 1/1000 second shutter speed. A similar version is later produced by Nikon as the Nikonos, with a maximum 1/500-second shutter speed and becomes the best-selling underwater camera series.
- 1961 — The San Diego Underwater Photographic Society is established, one of the earliest organizations dedicated to the advancement of underwater photography.

== Notable underwater photographers ==
- Tamara Benitez – Filipina cinematographer
- Georges Beuchat – French inventor, diver and businessman
- Adrian Biddle – English cinematographer
- Jonathan Bird – American photographer, cinematographer, director and television host.
- Eric Cheng – Taiwanese American entrepreneur and professional photographer
- Neville Coleman – Australian naturalist, underwater photographer, writer, publisher and educator
- Jacques Cousteau – French inventor of open circuit scuba, pioneer diver, author, film-maker and marine researcher
- John D. Craig – American businessman, writer, soldier, and diver
- Ben Cropp – Australian documentary filmmaker, conservationist and spearfisherman
- Bernard Delemotte – French diver and photographer
- David Doubilet – French diver and photographer
- John Christopher Fine – American marine biologist, wreck diver and author
- Rodney Fox – Australian diver, film maker and conservationist
- Ric Frazier – American photographer
- Stephen Frink – Underwater photographer and publisher
- Peter Gimbel – American filmmaker and underwater photojournalist
- Monty Halls – British TV broadcaster, diver and naturalist
- Alexander James Hamilton – British fine-art photographer known for underwater vanitas still lifes shot on analogue film
- Hans Hass – Austrian biologist, film-maker, and underwater diving pioneer
- Henry Way Kendall – American particle physicist who won the Nobel Prize in Physics
- Rudie Kuiter – Dutch-born Australian underwater photographer, taxonomist, and marine biologist
- Joseph B. MacInnis – Canadian physician, author, poet and aquanaut
- Luis Marden – American photographer, explorer, writer, filmmaker, diver, navigator, and linguist
- Agnes Milowka – Australian cave diver
- Noel Monkman – New Zealand born Australian filmmaker specialising in underwater photography
- Steve Parish – British born Australian photographer and publisher
- Zale Parry – American pioneer scuba diver, underwater photographer and actress
- Pierre Petit – Early French photographer. First to attempt underwater photography
- Ronald C. Phillips – American marine botanist and professor. Produced coral and seagrass slides 1960s onwards for international scientific publications and university education
- Leni Riefenstahl – German film director, producer, screenwriter, editor, photographer, actress and dancer
- Christy Lee Rogers – Underwater fine art photographer
- Peter Scoones – Underwater cameraman
- Brian Skerry – American photojournalist
- Wesley C. Skiles – American cave diver and underwater cinematographer
- E. Lee Spence – underwater archaeologist
- Philippe Tailliez – French pioneer of scuba diving and underwater photographer
- Ron Taylor and Valerie Taylor – Australian divers and shark cinematographers
- Albert Tillman – American educator and underwater diver.
- John Veltri – American filmmaker and underwater photographer
- Stan Waterman – Cinematographer and underwater film producer
- J. Lamar Worzel – American geophysicist and underwater photographer
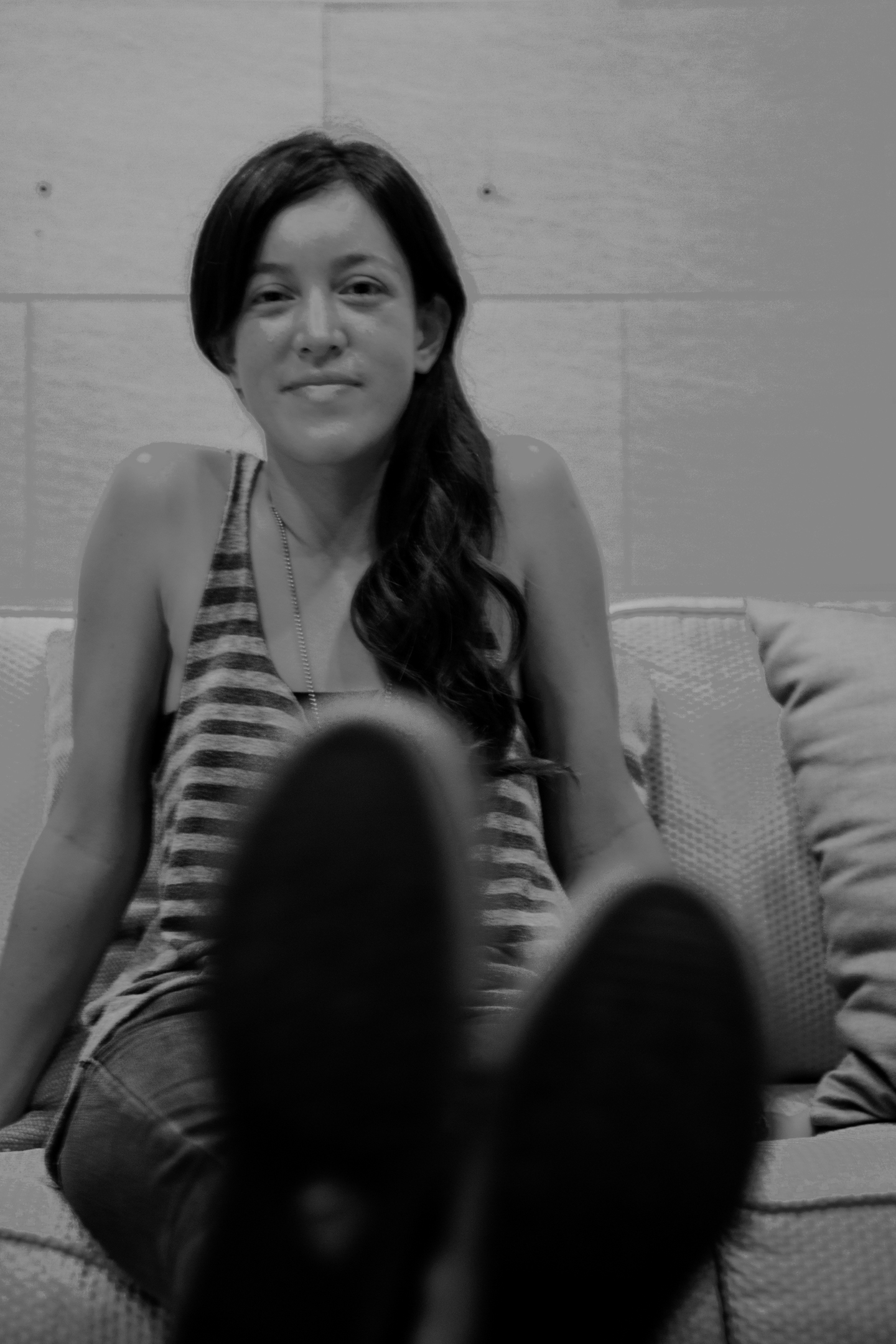
Tamara Benitez

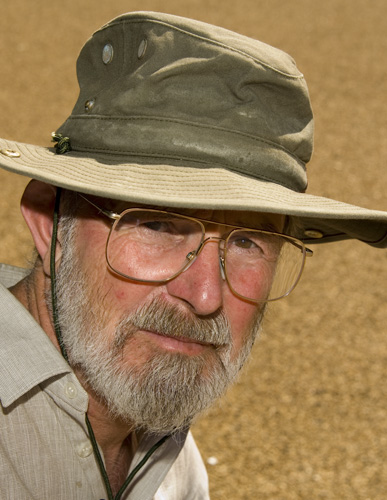
Peter Scoones

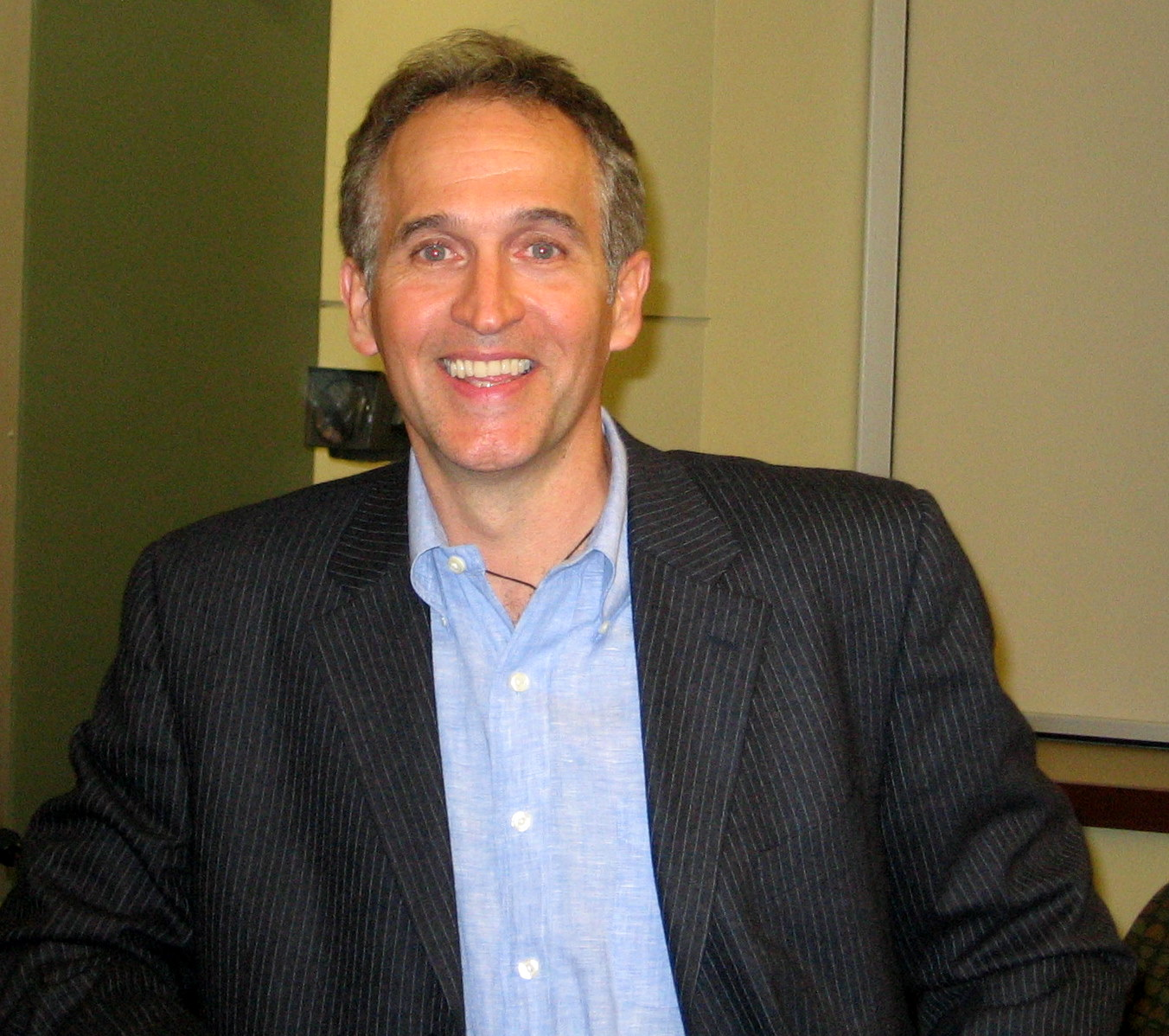
Brian Skerry

== See also ==
- Diving equipment – Equipment used to facilitate underwater diving
- Outline of photography – Art and practice of creating images by recording light
- Nature photography – Photography genre
- Underwater photography (sport) – Competitive underwater digital photography on scuba
- Underwater Photography World Championships – International event for the sport of underwater photography
- Underwater videography – Electronic underwater photography concerned with capturing moving images
- Action camera – These cameras can be used for underwater photography and videography

== Bibliography ==
- Bourjon, Philippe; Ducarme, Frédéric; Quod, Jean-Pascal; Sweet, Michael (2018). "Involving recreational snorkelers in inventory improvement or creation: a case study in the Indian Ocean". Cahiers de Biologie Marine. 59: 451–460. doi:10.21411/CBM.A.B05FC714.
