= Digital darkroom =

Digital darkroom is the hardware, software and techniques used in digital photography that replace the darkroom equivalents, such as enlarging, cropping, dodging and burning, as well as processes that do not have a film equivalent.

All photographs benefit from being developed. With film this could be done at the print lab, or an inexpensive home darkroom. With digital, many cameras are set up to do basic photo enhancement (contrast, color saturation) immediately after a picture is exposed, and to deliver a finished product. Higher end cameras, however, tend to give a flatter, more neutral image that has more data but less "pop," and needs to be developed in the digital darkroom.

Setting up a film darkroom was primarily an issue of gathering the right chemicals and lighting; a digital darkroom consists of a powerful computer, a high-quality monitor setup (dual monitors are often used) and software. A printer is optional; many photographers still send their images to a professional lab for better results and, in some cases, a better price.

While each implementation is unique, most share several traits: an image editing workstation as the cornerstone, often a database-driven digital asset management system like Media Pro 1 to manage the collection as a whole, a RAW conversion tool like Adobe Photoshop Lightroom or Capture One, and in many cases the software that came with the camera is used as an automated tool to "upload" photos to the computer. The machine itself is almost always outfitted with as much RAM as possible and a large storage subsystem - big hard drives. RAID and external USB and FireWire drives are popular for storage. Most photographers consider a DVD-burner essential for making long term backups, and keep at least one set off-site.

The term was coined by Gerard Holzmann of Bell Labs for a book entitled Beyond Photography: The Digital Darkroom, in which he describes his pico image manipulation language (not to be confused with the pico programming language).

== Software ==
The software employed in a digital darkroom varies greatly depending on the photographer's needs, budget and skill. The following are general areas and examples of software.

Image Acquisition: entails downloading images from a camera or removable storage device or importing from a scanner. Windows XP and Windows Vista both include an inbuilt wizard for importing images, including scanning images. Many professionals however may choose an importation tool built into image management software such as Adobe Photoshop Lightroom, Apple Aperture, ACDSee, Capture One, or darktable.

Image Library Management: involves managing images in a photographer's library and may extend to backing up images. Software such as Adobe Photoshop Lightroom, Apple Aperture and Media Pro 1 are examples of major image management software.

RAW Software: software, either stand alone or as part of image library management software that is designed to import and process RAW images. Most digital cameras capable of outputting RAW images will include a program or plug-in for this purpose such as Canon RAW Image Converter. Commercial Programs such as Adobe Photoshop Lightroom, Apple Aperture and Capture One, as well as open source projects such as darktable and RawTherapee, include extensive support for RAW importation and processing.

Image Editing: There are countless image editing suites, programs and tools available. Adobe Photoshop is among the most highly used in professional circles as are programs from Apple Inc., Microsoft, Macromedia (now Adobe), ACD, Phase One and various open source projects. Consumers may use professional software or choose less expensive options such as Adobe Photoshop Elements, Capture One Express or free open source options such as GIMP.

Camera Control Software: software that can remotely control a camera from a computer connected via USB (tethered shooting). Normally included as utilities with camera, these allow photographers to control the camera from a nearby computer. Cameras such as the Canon 40D include such software and a live view mode so that a user may use a computer to control numerous functions of the camera while seeing a virtual viewfinder onscreen.

Capture One is one of the pioneer software programs used for tethered shooting which is very useful especially for studio photographers.

Capture Pilot is a photography app with camera control. The photographer is able to use a virtual camera display on an iPhone or iPad to remotely fire the camera and control capture parameters such as ISO sensitivity, exposure mode, shutter speed, aperture, exposure compensation. Capture Pilot requires Capture One to function.

== Hardware ==
As image size and resolution increases, so do the requirements for hardware in a digital darkroom.

Computer: A computer in a digital darkroom typically have a generous amount of RAM, often 4GB or more, coupled with discrete graphics and a powerful multicore processor. For much of the 1980s and 90s, Macintosh based systems were dominant in the digital imaging market as Adobe's powerful new Photoshop software had only then been developed for the Mac. However, Windows-based systems such as Dell's high-end Precision range have become increasingly popular in recent times; better value for money than Apple's high-end Mac Pro and a more familiar operating system are both factors that affect the choice of many prospective buyers of photo-editing systems.

Cameras/Scanners: Digital cameras and image scanners are increasing in quality, including the amount of colour they can capture and output. Many newer digital cameras can support wider colour spaces such as Adobe RGB and have higher resolution analog-to-digital converters; 14 bits rather than the common 12 bits.

Displays: Professionals may use premium displays from companies such as EIZO and Dell which are capable of displaying a wider range of colours than consumer oriented devices.

Printers: In addition to computers and displays, digital darkrooms may include printing equipment, ranging from smaller size printers for proofing to large format productions printers. Scanner and studio photographic equipment may also be included.
