= Nikonos =

Brand of 35mm film amphibious cameras

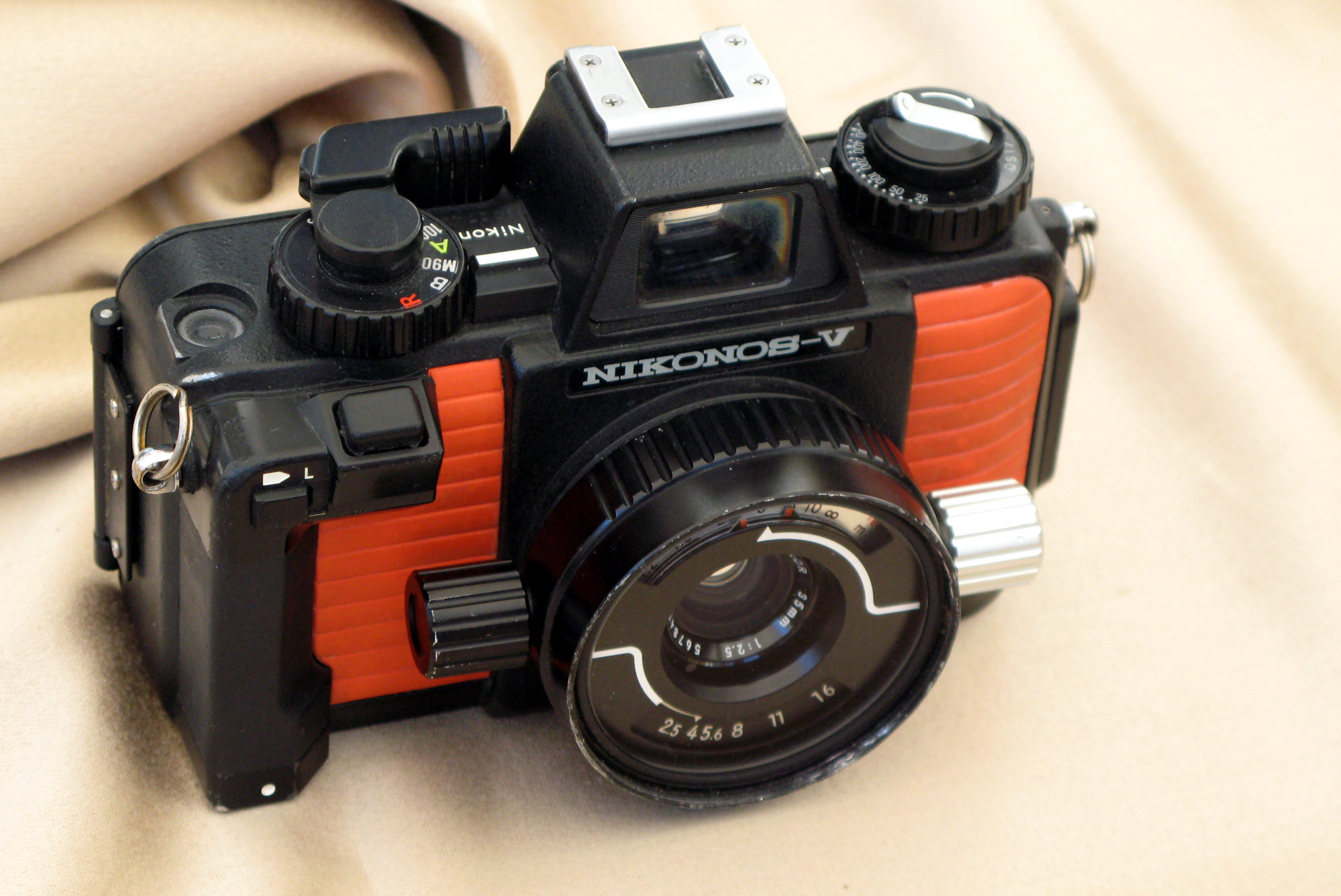
- Nikonos V black/orange (also available in all green)

Overview
- Maker: Nikon
- Type: 35 mm underwater viewfinder camera

Lens
- Lens mount: interchangeable Nikonos mount

Focusing
- Focus: manual preset

Exposure/metering
- Exposure: TTL automatic exposure & manual

Flash
- Flash: accessory shoe & contacts in base

Shutter
- Frame rate: manual wind on

General
- Dimensions: 146×99×75 mm (5.7×3.9×3.0 in) (W * H×D)

Nikonos is the brand name of a series of 35mm format cameras specifically designed for underwater photography launched by Nikon in 1963. The early Nikonos cameras were improvements of the Calypso camera, which was an original design by Jacques-Yves Cousteau and Belgian engineer Jean de Wouters. It was produced in France by La Spirotechnique (currently Aqua Lung) until the design was acquired by Nikon to become the Nikonos. The Nikonos system was immensely popular with both amateur and professional underwater photographers. Its compact design, ease of use, and excellent optical quality set the standard for several decades of underwater imaging. Nikon ceased development and manufacture of new Nikonos cameras in 2001, but the camera remains popular, and there is a large and active secondary market.

== History ==
Nippon Kogaku trace their underwater camera history back to 1956, when the company developed an underwater housing for the Nikon S2 rangefinder camera, which was marketed in May as the Nikon Marine. At approximately the same time, Jean de Wouters was building the first prototypes of the Calypso for La Spirotechnique, which went into serial production in 1961. However, La Spirotechnique was not experienced with camera design and manufacture, so they approached Nippon Kogaku to license the production and sales rights in June 1961; the two companies signed a contract in February 1962 granting the worldwide sales and distribution rights to Nikon outside France and the European Economic Community.

Nippon Kogaku acquired the patent to the Calypso in 1963 and began manufacturing the Nikonos (later designated the Nikonos I) equipped with Nikkor optics instead of the original SOM Berthiot and Angenieux lenses.

=== The "Workhorse of the War" ===
Because of its waterproof housing, lens options, and toughness, the Nikonos was an important tool for photographers working in the steaming jungles, flooded rice paddies, and rain-lashed battlefields of the Vietnam War. The wire services loaded their Nikonos cameras with Tri-X, Ektachrome-X or High-Speed Ektachrome.

=== Discontinuation ===
Nikon continued to manufacture Nikonos V bodies until 2001, when it formally announced it was terminating the series. Without any new models in years and with digital imaging taking over the market, Nikon saw no reason to continue the series.

However, in a 2010 interview with French magazine Focus-Numérique, Tetsuro Goto, Director of Laboratory Research and Development at Nikon Japan, said on the future of Nikonos, "Personally, I think the Nikonos will be reborn in the future."

== Design and operation ==
The numbered Nikonos cameras are often called rangefinder cameras, but in truth they are scale focus cameras as there is no rangefinder. The viewfinder is used purely to compose the shot, and to display exposure information on bodies with internal metering (Nikonos IV-A and V).

Focus distance is set with an outsized dial mounted on the left side of the lens barrel (as seen from the operator's point of view), and the aperture is set with a dial mounted on the right. Refraction affects the estimated distance underwater by making objects appear 25% closer than they actually are; for example, an object that appears to be three feet away underwater (judged by size) is actually four feet away. Nikon assumed the user did not compensate for appearances underwater, so the distance markers on the lens are marked for apparent (not actual) distance. Thankfully the Nikonos wide-angle lenses have ample depth of field, so these discrepancies are often not a noticeable problem. The depth of field indicators on most Nikonos Nikkor lenses mechanically adjust with aperture.

The numbered Nikonos models all had rugged construction, simple controls, and were waterproof to 50 m (160 ft). The camera is made waterproof by a simple system of o-rings at all the crucial joints. Each new model brought various improvements such as light metering, flash circuitry, and improved shutter and film advance design.

Nikonos camera specifications
Model	Intro	Disc	Image	Size (W×H×D)	Weight	Metering	Shutter speeds	Serial numbers	Price	Ref.
(I)	Mar 1963	Mar 1969		125 mm × 97 mm × 68 mm (4.9 in × 3.8 in × 2.7 in) (Note: With W-Nikkor 35mm f/2.5 lens)	700 g (25 oz)	External, manual shutter speed & aperture	B, 1/30, 1/60, 1/125, 1/250, 1/500	900001–? 30,675 shipped	¥28,500	
II	May 1968	Mar 1976		129 mm × 99 mm × 47 mm (5.1 in × 3.9 in × 1.9 in) (Note: Body alone)	495 g (17.5 oz)	External, manual shutter speed & aperture	B, 1/30, 1/60, 1/125, 1/250, 1/500	950004–? 92,935 shipped	¥23,000	
III	Jun 1975	Sep 1983		144 mm × 99 mm × 47 mm (5.7 in × 3.9 in × 1.9 in)	620 g (22 oz)	External, manual shutter speed & aperture	B, 1/30, 1/60, 1/125, 1/250, 1/500	3100001–? 78,309 shipped	¥45,000	
IV-A	Jul 1980	1984		149 mm × 99 mm × 58 mm (5.9 in × 3.9 in × 2.3 in)	740 g (26 oz)	Internal TTL, Aperture-priority autoexposure	Electronic stepless 1/30 to 1/1000; Mechanical (B, 1/90)	4100001–?	¥54,500	
V	Apr 1984	Oct 2001		146 mm × 99 mm × 58 mm (5.7 in × 3.9 in × 2.3 in)	700 g (25 oz)	Internal TTL, Aperture-priority autoexposure and manual modes	Electronic stepless 1/30 to 1/1000 (autoexposure mode); Manual (electronic control 1/30, 1/60, 1/125, 1/250, 1/500, 1/1000); Mechanical (B, 1/90)	2000001–?	¥73,000	
RS	Jun 1992	Aug 1996		196 mm × 151 mm × 85 mm (7.7 in × 5.9 in × 3.3 in)	2,130 g (75 oz)	Internal TTL, Aperture-priority autoexposure and manual modes	B to 1/2000	0000001–?	¥390,000	

=== First generation Calypso derivatives ===
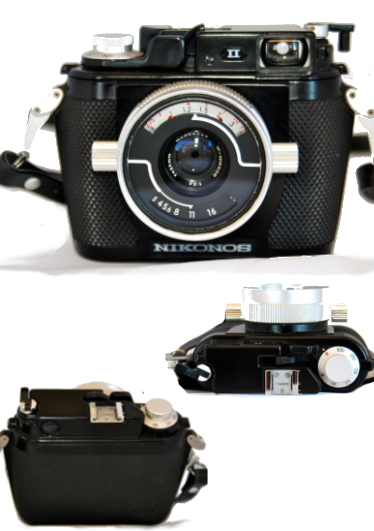
Nikonos II, one of the "Calypso"-derived models

The initial Nikonos line consisted of three models that were improved versions of Cousteau's Calypso of 1961:

- Nikonos (1963), renamed Nikonos I after the Nikonos II was released
- Nikonos II (1968)
- Nikonos III (1975)

The Nikonos was introduced at Photokina 1963; in the beginning, each camera was individually tested for water-tightness. In Europe, under the terms of the licensing agreement, the Nikonos was known as the Calypso/Nikkor. In July 1966, Nikon began marketing the Nikonos as an all-weather camera and sold a limited number of cameras with a white finish, which consisted of Nikonos cameras with white leather body panels. It is estimated that less than 150 examples of the white-finished Nikonos were made.

In total, approximately 200,000 Nikonos I, II, and III cameras were manufactured between 1963 and 1983. The three Calypso-based Nikonos models share the same basic structure where the complete camera consists of three modules: lens, housing, and shutter/film transport assemblies. Film is loaded in the shutter/film assembly, which is inserted into the housing, and the mounting of the lens locks the three pieces together. The strap lugs are used to pry the shutter/film assembly out of the housing.

The Nikonos II was cosmetically and dimensionally similar to the original Nikonos, but the shutter speed dial has an additional rewind setting, and the rewind knob is equipped with a lever to facilitate operation. Internally, all parts of the Nikonos II were coated to avoid corrosion; in case of leakage, the internal parts could be rinsed in fresh water and dried, leading some to call the Nikonos II indestructible. The film transport mechanism was redesigned for the Nikonos III to use the sprocket holes for positive framing; the original Calypso design did not count sprocket holes which sometimes resulted in overlapping frames. This resulted in a noticeably larger body. In addition, the flash sync port gained an extra pin to support electronic flash units.

=== Second generation metered cameras ===
A second viewfinder line was Nikon's complete re-design and included a through-the-lens (TTL) light meter with automatic exposure:

- Nikonos IV-A (1980)
- Nikonos V (1984)

In contrast to the prior Nikonos line, the Nikonos IV-A introduced a one-piece body using a hinged back for film loading; sealing was accomplished through numerous o-rings, including a large gasket for the back. The film transport mechanism for the IV-A was adapted from the contemporary Nikon EM. Like the EM, the Nikonos IV-A primarily operated in aperture-priority autoexposure mode using stepless quartz-controlled shutter speeds between 1/30 and 1/1000, but the camera also offered two mechanical shutter speeds ([B]ulb and 1/90, marked as M90) in case of battery failure. In addition, the shutter speed dial can be set to "R"ewind. The viewfinder is equipped with a LED indicator, which glows steadily when the shutter speed is in the operating range (1/30 – 1/1000), and blinks when the range is exceeded.

The Nikonos V retained the new features of the IV-A and added manual control to set discrete shutter speeds. The V was released to address specific criticisms of the IV-A, namely that the flat gasket design was prone to failure, and that the new flash sync shutter speed of 1/90 was too fast, especially since slower speeds could not be set manually to use fill-flash. The Nikonos V was capable of off-the-film-plane flash metering with the SB-102 speedlight, which was introduced alongside the camera at the Photo Marketing Association Show in Las Vegas, held April 1984.

=== Third generation autofocus SLR ===
- Nikonos RS (1992) waterproof to 320 ft (100m) (World's first underwater Auto-Focus SLR camera)

The 1992 Nikonos RS introduced an entirely new concept. Unlike its predecessors, the RS was a complete amphibious single lens reflex camera, with auto-focus, waterproof to 100 m (330 ft) and its own set of unique lenses that also utilized water-contact optics. They are, a 50mm f/2.8 macro, 28mm wide, 13mm fisheye, and the world's first underwater zoom lens, a 20-35mm. The body features considerable automation, with a built-in motor drive for film advance and rewinding, an autofocus system with multiple modes, DX film speed detection, and an aperture-priority autoexposure mode. It is equipped with a high-eyepoint "action" finder, with an eye relief of 60 mm (2.4 in), allowing the user to wear a typical underwater mask.

Previous Nikonos models used lens-mounted knobs for aperture and focus; these controls were moved to the top deck and front grip of the Nikonos RS, respectively.

Nikonos list prices (June 1, 1996)
Item	MSRP	Item	MSRP
Nikonos RS	$3,550	Nikonos V	$800
R-UW AF Nikkor 28mm	$995	UW-Nikkor 28mm	$488
R-UW AF Micro-Nikkor 50mm	$1,560	W-Nikkor 80mm	$488
R-UW AF Micro-Nikkor 50mm	$1,560	UW Close-up Outfit (Note: Includes close-up lens, field frames, and case)	$530
R-UW AF Zoom-Nikkor 20-35mm	$3,690	UW-Nikkor 20mm	$960
R-UW AF Fisheye-Nikkor 13mm	$2,480	UW-Nikkor 15mm(N)	$2,190
SB-104 (set) (Note: Includes strobe head, spare o-rings, mounting bracket, and sync cord) (Note: SN-104 ($198) and SH-104 ($427) sold separately)	$1,560		
SB-105 (set)	$820		
Notes

The RS represented the pinnacle of Nikon's commitment to underwater imaging, and generated significant interest at the time. Although groundbreaking in many ways, it was also very expensive, putting it out of reach of all but the most dedicated (or best funded) underwater photographers. According to Brian Long, the RS was a development of Japan's bubble economy of the late 80s, which saw a number of cost-no-object consumer products and automobiles produced. The potential market was further limited by export controls placed on the camera; the potential for using it in underwater espionage was seen as enough to justify treating it as a strategic product.

Unfortunately, early versions also had a tendency to flood if not maintained perfectly. Flooding was attributed to many factors, one of which was the change to orange-colored silicone o-rings that could swell and fail if third-party silicone grease was applied instead of the Nikonos grease that was petroleum-based. Non-Nikon (third party) silicone grease was commonly used without problems on black Nikonos o-rings by underwater photographers for several decades. Nikon replaced all these floods at first, but in the end, it clearly became not worth the trouble. The RS was quietly discontinued about 5 years later, and no subsequent models were ever designed or manufactured.

=== Digital Nikonos ===
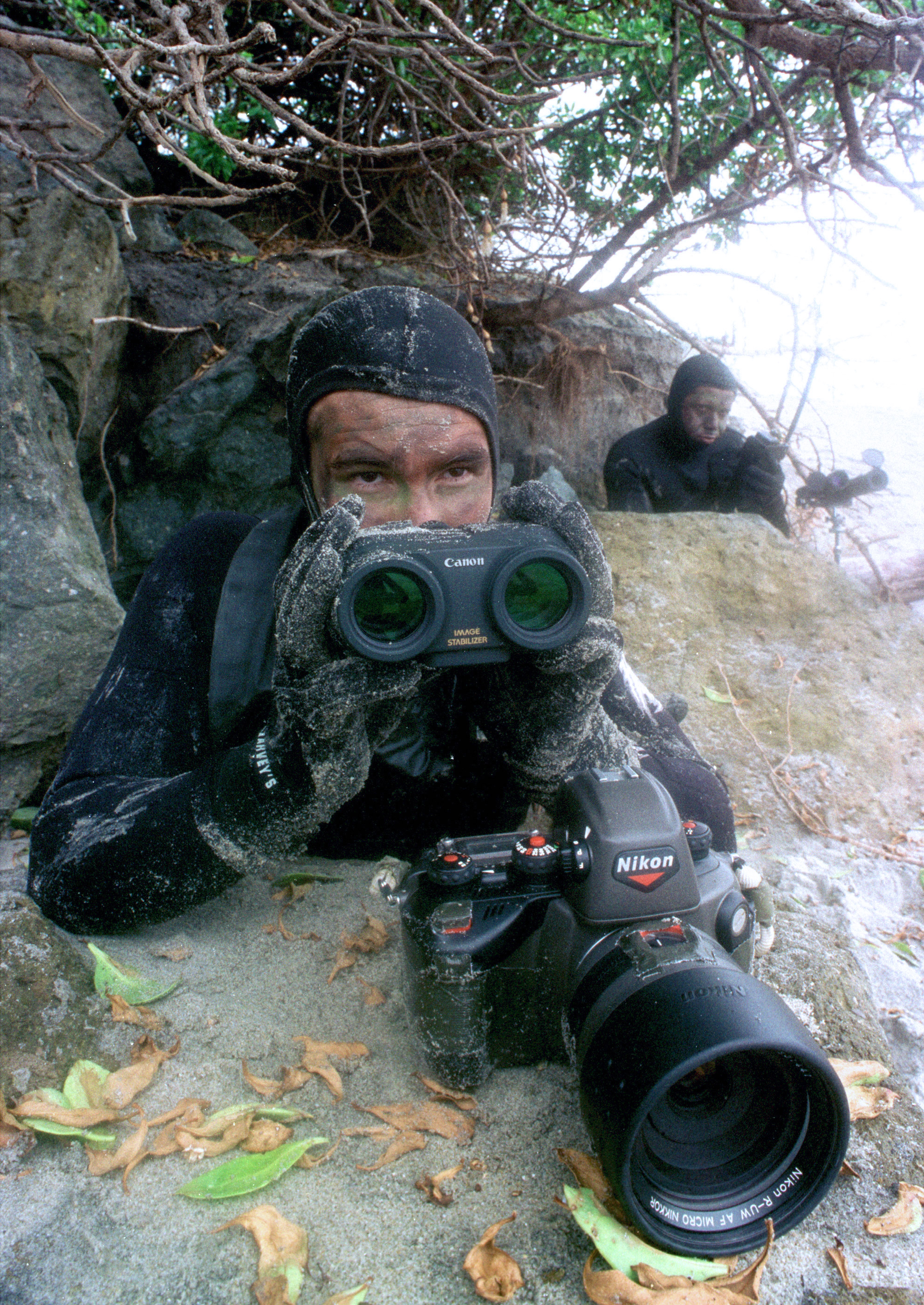
United States Navy SEALs with a Nikon/Kodak DCS 425 underwater digital camera

No Digital Nikonos has ever been made, but the Commercial & Government Systems division of Kodak modified a small number of Nikonos RS cameras for the United States Navy to create a digital unit known as the "Nikon/Kodak DCS 425". The digital imaging portion was housed in an extended rear door and were largely identical to the options available for the contemporary Kodak DCS 420 cameras based on the Nikon F90.

Nikon celebrated the Nikonos legacy when the Nikon 1 AW1 was released, a waterproof interchangeable-lens digital camera. Reviewers compared the features of the AW1 to the Nikonos line.

== Lenses ==
=== Nikonos mount ===
With the exception of the above-water only LW-Nikkor 28mm, all Nikonos Nikkor lenses use two knobs to facilitate focus and aperture operation with gloved hands. In later years, these knobs were colored differently to allow the photographer to more clearly distinguish between their functions; for these lenses, the silver or chrome knob sets the focus distance, and the black knob controls the aperture. The LW-Nikkor uses conventional concentric focus and aperture rings.

The two most common Nikonos lenses are the UW 28mm (for underwater use only) and the W 35mm (which is amphibious) with the UW 28mm being considered the better lens. Because water and air have significantly different indices of refraction, the 35mm lens is considered slightly wide on land, but is equivalent to a standard ~50mm lens under water. The nominal focal length can be multiplied by 1.33× to determine the equivalent angle of view underwater. These were also the first two lenses to be introduced with the Nikonos; the design of the W-Nikkor 35mm is based on the Nikkor 35mm f/2.5 lens for M39 mount first sold in 1952; it is a symmetric Double-Gauss lens behind an optical flat to make the assembly water-tight. This improves lens speed compared with the original lens fitted to the Calypso, the SOM Berthiot 35mm f/3.5, which had a Tessar-type construction.

The Nikonos lenses designated "UW-Nikkor" were specifically designed for underwater photography only. It is said that, even to this day, no underwater lens matches the Nikonos "UW" lenses for sharpness and color saturation underwater. A brief explanation from Nikon about the difference between underwater-only lens and standard/"amphibious" lens can be found at Nikon official site, under the section "2. Rendition characteristics and lens performance".

Nikon also created two lenses for use both above and under water, and one of them, the 35mm f/2.5, can be thought of as the "kit" lens. They made the Nikonos useful for aquatic activities such as kayaking, canoeing, or for foul weather situations. These two lenses, the W-35mm and W-80mm, were also fully waterproof, but because they utilized a flat port, they did not have the benefit of the specialized water-contact optics.

Nikonos lenses
Name	Focal length	Intro	Aperture	Water (Note: Suitability for photographs above water, below water, or both.)		Min focus	Angle of view (Note: Provided for above and/or below water, as applicable.)		Construction		Size		Attachment size	Ref.
Name	Focal length	Intro	Aperture	Above	Below	Min focus	Above	Below	Eles	Grps	(Φ×L)	Weight	Attachment size	Ref.
UW-Nikkor	15mm	1972 (Note: Blocks metering path for Nikonos IV-A and V, can only be used in manual mode.)	f/2.8–22	No	Yes	1 ft 0.30 m (Note: Sub-scale provided for focus from 0.9 to 0.7 ft (0.27 to 0.21 m) underwater.)	—	94°	9 (Note: Includes front glass dome)	5	90 mm × 79.5 mm 3.54 in × 3.13 in	340 g 12 oz	84mm, P=0.75mm	
UW-Nikkor	15mm	1981	f/2.8–22	No	Yes	1 ft 0.30 m	—	94°	12	9	93 mm × 90.6 mm 3.66 in × 3.57 in	665 g 23.5 oz	87mm, P=0.75mm	
UW-Nikkor	20mm	1985	f/2.8–22	No	Yes	1.3 ft 0.40 m	—	78°	9	7	70 mm × 74 mm 2.8 in × 2.9 in	350 g 12 oz	67mm, P=0.75mm	
LW-Nikkor	28mm	1984	f/2.8–22	Yes	No	1.5 ft 0.46 m	74°	—	5	5	68.5 mm × 57 mm 2.70 in × 2.24 in	240 g 8.5 oz	52mm, P=0.75mm	
UW-Nikkor	28mm	1965	f/3.5–22	No	Yes	2 ft 0.61 m	—	59°	6	5	62 mm × 43.8 mm 2.44 in × 1.72 in	175 g 6.2 oz	58mm, P=0.75mm	
W-Nikkor	35mm	1963	f/2.5–22	Yes	Yes	2.75 ft 0.84 m	62°	46°30'	7 (Note: Includes front flat glass plate)	5	62 mm × 39.5 mm 2.44 in × 1.56 in	160 g 5.6 oz	58mm, P=0.75mm	
W-Nikkor	80mm	1969	f/4–22	Yes	Yes	3.5 ft 1.1 m	30°20'	22°45'	5	5	62 mm × 66 mm 2.4 in × 2.6 in	275 g 9.7 oz	58mm, P=0.75mm	

=== Nikonos RS mount ===
The Nikonos RS mount is physically identical to the older Nikon F mount, but an additional external bayonet was added for sealing, and the claws are slightly offset compared to the venerable still camera mount. The electronic signaling is also different from regular AF Nikon bodies.

The sharpness of a remounted R-UW AF Fisheye-Nikkor 13mm was tested and found to be superior to an equivalent AF Fisheye-Nikkor 16mm using a dome port.

Nikonos RS lenses
Name	Focal length	Intro	Aperture	Water (Note: Suitability for photographs above water, below water, or both.)		Min focus	Angle of view (Note: Provided for above and/or below water, as applicable.)		Construction		Size		Attachment size	Ref.
Name	Focal length	Intro	Aperture	Above	Below	Min focus	Above	Below	Eles	Grps	(Φ×L)	Weight	Attachment size	Ref.
R-UW AF Fisheye-Nikkor	13mm	1994	f/2.8–22	No	Yes	0.5 ft 0.15 m	—	170°	10 (Note: Includes L37c filter)	7	126 mm × 92 mm 5.0 in × 3.6 in	970 g 34 oz	—	
R-UW AF Zoom-Nikkor (Note: World's first true underwater zoom lens)	20–35mm	1992	f/2.8–22	No	Yes	0.38 ft 0.12 m	—	80° to 51°	10	10	162 mm × 129 mm 6.4 in × 5.1 in	1,750 g 62 oz	148mm, P=1.0mm	
R-UW AF Nikkor	28mm	1992	f/2.8–22	No	Yes	0.9 ft 0.27 m	—	60°	6	6	99 mm × 77 mm 3.9 in × 3.0 in	550 g 19 oz	88mm, P=1.0mm	
R-UW AF Micro-Nikkor (Note: Focuses to a reproduction ratio of 1:1)	50mm	1992	f/2.8–22	Yes	Yes	6.6 in 0.167 m	—	35°	10	9	103 mm × 126 mm 4.1 in × 5.0 in	1,100 g 39 oz	88mm, P=1.0mm	

=== Third party lenses ===
Lenses were made for the original Nikonos mount (for example, by Sea&Sea), which included both prime lenses as well as focal length converters which attached to the front of a Nikonos lens.

Nikonos mount lenses by third parties
Name	Focal length	Intro	Aperture	Water (Note: Suitability for photographs above water, below water, or both.)		Min focus	Angle of view (Note: Provided for above and/or below water, as applicable.)		Construction		Size		Attachment size	Ref.
Name	Focal length	Intro	Aperture	Above	Below	Min focus	Above	Below	Eles	Grps	(Φ×L)	Weight	Attachment size	Ref.
Sea&Sea SWL Fisheye (64000) (Note: "Full frame" or diagonal fisheye lens)	12mm	1994?	f/3.5–22	No	Yes	11.8 in 0.30 m	—	167°	9	6	108 mm × 91 mm 4.3 in × 3.6 in	570 g 20 oz	—	
Sea&Sea WL-15 (63000)	15mm	?	f/3.5–22	No	Yes	10 in 0.25 m	—	96°	10	8	85 mm × 68 mm 3.3 in × 2.7 in	365 g 12.9 oz		
Sea&Sea WCL-16 (62001) (Note: Fitted to front of and requires W-Nikkor 35mm f/2.5 lens.)	16mm	?	f/5.6–22	No	Yes	1 ft 0.30 m	—	91°	4	4	78 mm × 54 mm 3.1 in × 2.1 in	400 g 14 oz		
Sea&Sea WL-17	17mm	?	f/3.5–22	No	Yes	?	—	86°	?	?	89 mm × 102 mm 3.5 in × 4 in	440 g 15.5 oz		
Subatec Subawider (II, III) (Note: Also applicable to the UW-Nikkor 28mm lens.)	17mm (Note: 13mm with the 28mm lens)	?	f/2.5–22	No	Yes	?	—	90° (Note: 103° with the 28mm lens)	?	?	?	?		
Sea&Sea WL-18 (Note: Blocks metering path for Nikonos IV-A and V, can only be used in manual mode.)	18mm	?	f/3.5–16	No	Yes	?	—	?	?	?	?	?		
Sea&Sea WL-20 (60000)	20mm	?	f/3.5–22	No	Yes	1.3 ft 0.40 m	—	80°	7	7	57 mm × 62 mm 2.2 in × 2.4 in	270 g 9.5 oz		
Seacor Sea-Eye	21mm	?	f/3.3–16	No	Yes	2.5 ft 0.76 m	—	92°	?	?	?	?		

== Accessories ==
=== Closeup ===
- Extension tubes mounted with a Nikonos lens for macro photography, most commonly with the 35mm Nikonos lens to produce 2:1, 1:1 and 1:2 macro image ratios, with 1:3 occasionally seen as well. Offered by third parties; no Nikon extension tubes were produced.
- Nikon Close Up Kit, which included a close-up lens that attached to the front of either the UW 28 mm, W 35 mm, or W 80mm Nikonos lenses, a frame support bracket, and three field frames (one for each lens) to produce near-macro image ratios (approx range of 1:5 to 1:3, depending on the lens in use).
- Third-party close-up lenses

Because the numbered Nikonos cameras did not offer through-the-lens viewing, the extremely shallow depth of field for macro photography pragmatically required a focusing aid. The extension tube and Close Up Kit systems used a framer, which attached to the lens assembly and provided a direct physical index for the camera-to-subject distance, as well as its approximate width/height. The Nikon Close Up Kit provided a complete rectangular frame, but most third-party extension tube kits typically only indexed the bottom and two sides, not the top, and because of this shape, a slang term for Nikonos framers were Goal Posts.

For various reasons (such as concern for potential damage to the reef), some alternative products were developed over time to minimize or replace the basic framer design. One example (Fred Dion; Underwater Photo Tech) consisted of a bracket that held two small flashlights whose beams aligned at the focus plane.

=== Nikonos light meter ===
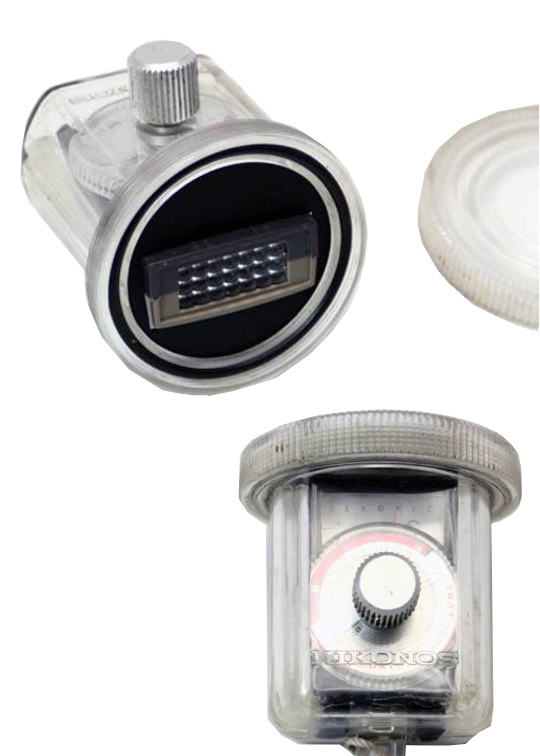
Nikonos light meter

The Nikonos light meter accessory houses the selenium-celled Sekonic L-86 Auto-Lumi. An underwater light meter is necessary for the Nikonos I, II, and III, which do not have metering in the body.

=== Flash ===
Because light becomes monochromatic as depth increases, a portable light source is required for underwater photography. The first Calypso-based Nikonos cameras (I and II) were equipped with two-pin sync ports for flashbulb units. The Nikonos III added a third pin to support electronic flash units; although a prototype was exhibited (SB-11), the first electronic Nikonos flash unit, the SB-101, was introduced with the Nikonos IV-A; both the IV-A and III supported the SB-101, but the IV-A dropped support for the flashbulb units. The SB-102 and -103 were introduced with the Nikonos V, with the SB-103 a more compact version of the SB-102, which in turn was an updated version of the SB-101. The SB-104 and -105 were introduced with the Nikonos RS; all four of these units (SB-102 through -105) supported TTL flash operation.

The SB-103 was recalled in September 1998; hydrogen gas could potentially build up and be ignited by the flash tube, which would eject the front lens and flash tube assembly from the unit. Owners of recalled units were offered the SB-105 as a replacement. Because the SB-103 housing was designed to be pressure-resistant, Nikon was unable to crush the recalled units and instead drilled a hole through the "103" marking on the side of the flash. Some of the recalled units were subsequently resold on the secondary market. The recall was still active as of October 2017; because the SB-105 is no longer being manufactured, SB-103 owners will instead receive a voucher.

Nikonos underwater flash specifications
Name	Guide No. (Note: With ISO 100 film)		Coverage (Land/Water)	Modes			Power	Size	Weight	Ref.
Name	Land	Water	Coverage (Land/Water)	TTL	Auto	Manual	Power	Size	Weight	Ref.
SB-101	32 m (105 ft) (Note: Optional SW-101 adapter to expand coverage to 79°/59° (land/water) for UW-Nikkor 28mm lens; reduces guide number to 22 and 11 m (72 and 36 ft) for land and water, respectively.)	16 m (52 ft)	66°/50° (Note: Covers W-Nikkor 35mm lens without accessories.)	No	Yes (Note: Using SU-101 sensor)	Yes (Full, 1/4)	8×"AA"/R6	403 mm × 94 mm × 157 mm 15.9 in × 3.7 in × 6.2 in (H×W×D) (Note: Includes grip.)	1,900 g (67 oz) (Note: Without batteries)	
SB-102	32 m (105 ft) (Note: Optional SW-102 adapter to expand coverage for UW-Nikkor 15mm lens; reduces guide number to 22 and 11 m (72 and 36 ft) for land and water, respectively.)	16 m (52 ft)	79°/59°	Yes (Note: With Nikonos V)	Yes	Yes (Full, 1/4, 1/16)	6×"C"/R14	139 mm × 152.5 mm × 212 mm 5.47 in × 6.00 in × 8.35 in (W×H×D) (Note: Strobe head only)	1,670 g (59 oz)	
SB-103	20 m (66 ft) (Note: Optional SW-103 adapter to expand coverage for UW-Nikkor 15mm lens; reduces guide number to 14 and 7 m (46 and 23 ft) for land and water, respectively.)	10 m (33 ft)	79°/59°	Yes	No	Yes (Full, 1/4, 1/16)	4×"AA"/R6	175 mm × 130 mm × 99 mm 6.9 in × 5.1 in × 3.9 in (W×H×D)	780 g (28 oz) (Note: 1,650 g (58 oz) with bracket, arm, joint, and sync cord.)	
SB-104	32 m (105 ft)	16 m (52 ft)	115°/100° (Note: Covers UW-Nikkor 15mm lens.)	Yes (Note: With Nikonos V and RS; Matrix-balanced fill-flash with Nikonos RS)	No	Yes (Full, 1/4, 1/16)	SN-104 NiCd	124 mm × 222 mm 4.9 in × 8.7 in (Φ×L)	1,990 g (70 oz) (Note: 3,450 g (122 oz) fully equipped, including SK-104A arm, SK-104B bracket/tray, and SN-104 battery)	
SB-105	22 m (72 ft)	11 m (36 ft)	103×84° (Note: Expands to 115° with SW-103.)	Yes (Note: With Nikonos V and RS.)	No	Yes (Full, 1/4, 1/16)	4×"AA"/R6	99 mm × 130 mm × 181 mm 3.9 in × 5.1 in × 7.1 in (W×H×D)	780 g (28 oz) (Note: 1,730 g (61 oz) with bracket, arm, joint, sync cord, and batteries.)	

== In popular culture ==
- An unbranded Nikonos I was operated by James Bond in the 1965 film Thunderball; in the film, the camera is capable of taking a series of eight photos with a single press of the film rewind knob.
