= John Veltri =

American filmmaker and underwater photographer

John Veltri is a photographer who was born in 1938 in California.

== Education ==
Veltri studied filmmaking and theatre at the Pasadena Playhouse of the Performing Arts, Los Angeles City College, Warner Bros. Film Studio and San Francisco State University. He began work as an experimental film maker in San Francisco.

== Career ==
From 1965 to 1975, Veltri worked in New York City where he began to photograph architecture, creating an important visual record of the places and people of Manhattan. He made photographic studies of a number of subjects, including the Statue of Liberty, Ellis Island, Jimi Hendrix' Electric Lady Studio, and New York's 37th Street, exhibited at the Canadian Centre for Architecture. He also illustrated several books written by photographer Andreas Feininger.

By the mid-1970s he had returned to California where he has since devoted himself to cinema, making documentaries dealing with native cultures, and social and community issues.

Veltri is the photographer for several publications, including Statue of Liberty (Doubleday 1971), The Parthenon (Newsweek 1973), Architectural Photography (AMPHOTO 1974) and The Greeks (Doubleday 1984).

Veltri is also noted for his underwater photography from his work as staff photographer on an archaeological expedition that uncovered the oldest shipwreck, the Kyrenia ship, off the north coast of Cyprus.

His recent documentary films in-production include "Seasons of the Soul", about American architect John M. Johansen, and "Walking Backwards into the Future", about Native American Karuk Elder, Charles Thom Sr.

Veltri's photographs can be found in the collections of the MoMA, the Ellis Island National Museum of Immigration, the Canadian Centre for Architecture, the library of the University of Pennsylvania Museum of Archaeology and Anthropology, and other private collections.
