= Calypso (camera) =

35mm film camera

Calypso underwater camera c.1960
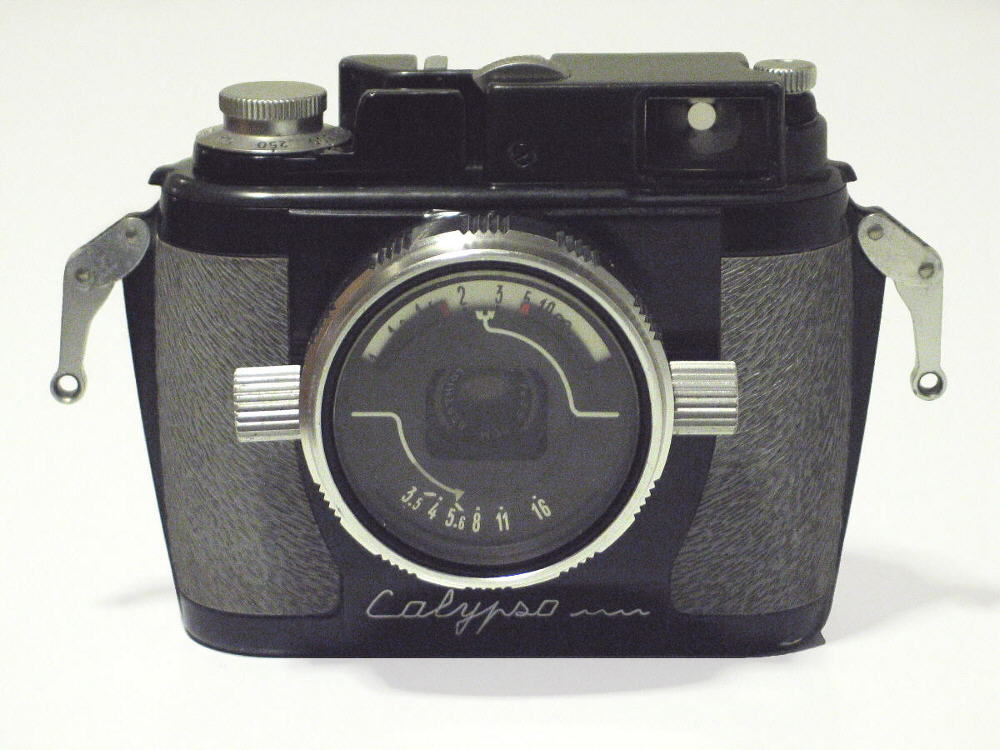
- Made in: France

The self-contained amphibious underwater Calypso 35mm film camera was conceived by the marine explorer Jacques Cousteau (1910–1997), designed by Jean de Wouters and manufactured by Atoms in France. It was distributed by La Spirotechnique in Paris from 1960. The camera is rated to operate down to 60 m (200 ft) below sea level. The Calypso was sometimes advertised as the "CALYPSO-PHOT". Nikon took over production and sold it from 1963 as the Nikonos, which subsequently became a well-known series of underwater cameras.

== History ==
de Wouters was a member of Cousteau's crew during the maiden voyage of the RV Calypso; after discussing ideas for a camera capable of underwater use, de Wouters designed and built a prototype in 1957, which he called the Spiro.

In order to reach a larger market the design was sold to Nikon in Japan, and in 1963 released as the Nikonos, subsequently becoming a long-lived series of underwater cameras, culminating with the introduction of the short-lived 35mm SLR Nikonos RS in 1992.

== Description ==
The Calypso is equally suitable for water and air environment photography. The body is covered in a grey imitation sealskin. Two carrying strap attachments, one on each side, are also used as opening levers.

=== Sealing ===
There are three basic components to the camera: the internal mechanism, an outer shell, and the interchangeable lens. The camera body consists of two black enameled cast alloy parts; one piece carries all the camera parts (winder, shutter, and viewfinder), which is lowered into the outer shell to assemble the body. They are locked together when the interchangeable lens is mounted to the camera. The camera-to-shell and lens-to-camera joints are sealed by greased O-rings to form a watertight unit.

To open the camera for film loading or unloading, the lens is dismounted and the carrying strap attachments are hooked under the top protrusions on either side; when the strap attachments are forced downwards, the internal mechanism is lifted out of the shell.

=== Operation ===
The portion of the internal mechanism that protrudes above the outer shell contains the built-in optical viewfinder for the 35mm standard lens, the shutter speed selector and rewind knobs, the winding mechanism and shutter release, and an accessory shoe for separate viewfinders to suit various purposes.

The most unusual feature of the Calypso is the combined wind-on and shutter release lever. A small rocking lever in front of the accessory shoe serves to lock the wind-on/shutter-release; the lock is disengaged by sliding it to the left (when the user is standing behind the camera). When unlocked, the wind-on/shutter-release swings forward away from the body by 65 degrees and is operated by the index finger. Depressing the lever back towards the body releases the shutter; after the shutter releases, the wind-on/shutter-release it relocates to the 65 degrees standoff position. Depressing the lever again cocks the shutter and winds on the film.

At the base of the camera, a special flash sync connector is protected by an aluminium plug that can be removed by a coin and is sealed by an o-ring. In addition, the automatic resetting frame counter is on the base, visible behind a glass window. No tripod socket is provided.

A small rewind knob at the left-hand top is extended for easy access and to engage the film transport mechanism. No rewind release facility is required; this function was later added to the Nikonos and marked R on the shutter-speed dial.

Inside the camera, the film cassette engages the rewind fork at the top, and it is held in place by a hinged retaining ring at the bottom. The film lead passes under the fixed black film-pressure plate on its way to the slotted large diameter take-up spool. The spool always rotates the same angular amount to advance the film without a sprocket wheel drive. Acceptable frame spacing is accomplished by the large diameter take-up spool that reduces the effect of increasing spool diameter as more film is wound onto it.

=== Lenses ===
The special Calypso lens mount is of the bayonet variety with an O-ring sealing. The lens locks in place when two pins engage corresponding slots in the periphery of the lens mount. The spring action of the O-ring keeps the pins engaged. The lens is released by first pulling the lens away from the body, then making a quarter turn in either direction.

The original lenses are listed below; however later Nikonos LW-, W-, and UW-Nikkor lenses use the same bayonet mount and are compatible.

- SOM Berthiot 1:3.3 f=28mm
- SOM Berthiot 1:3.5 f=35mm
- Angénieux 1:2.8 f=45mm

The standard SOM BERTHIOT FLOR 1:3.5 f=35 (mm) lens can be used both underwater and above due to the optical flat protecting front glass, but the lens has no filter thread at the front. Two large aluminium knobs either side of the lens provides aperture and focusing controls.

SOM is an acronym for Société d'Optique et de Mécanique de Haute Précision, which manufactured lenses branded as SOM-Berthiot for still and cinema cameras.

== Variants ==
The vertical running metal-plate focal-plane shutter of the original Calypso has speeds from 1/30 to 1/1000 second, but a year later that was changed to 1/15 to 1/500 second. The camera was very early on advertised, and possibly sold as, the Calypso Phot.

== Patents ==
- FR grant 1179442A, M. de Wouters d'Oplinter, "Objectif étanche pour appareil de prise de vues sous-marines", issued May 25, 1959
- FR grant 1217123A, M. de Wouters d'Oplinter, "Mécanisme d'entraînement du film dans les appareils photographiques", issued May 2, 1960
- DE grant 1088801B, J.G.M.J. de Wouters d'Oplinter, "Wasserdichte Anordnung des Objektivs an einem Unterwasseraufnahmegeraet", issued September 8, 1960
- FR grant 1247348A, M. de Wouters d'Oplinter, "Perfectionnement aux appareils de prise de vues", issued December 2, 1960
- FR grant 1255466A, M. de Wouters d'Oplinter, "Appareil photographique étanche à l'eau", issued March 10, 1961, assigned to Spirotechnique
- DE grant 1108557B, J.G.M.J. de Wouters d'Oplinter, "Filmtransportvorrichtung in photographischen Apparaten", issued June 8, 1961
- FR grant 1271120A, M. de Wouters d'Oplinter, "Obturateur focal pour la photographie", issued September 8, 1961, assigned to Spirotechnique
- FR grant 76197E, M. de Wouters d'Oplinter, "Objectif étanche pour appareil de prise de vues sous-marines", issued September 22, 1961
- US grant 3001462A, J.G.M.J. de Wouters d'Oplinter, "Liquid-tight objective for underwater photographic apparatus", issued September 26, 1961
- CH grant 360273A, J.G.M.J. de Wouters d'Oplinter, "Mécanisme d'enroulement du film pour appareil photographique", issued February 15, 1962
- FR grant 1299067A, M. de Wouters d'Oplinter, "Hublot étanche pour applications sous-marines", issued July 20, 1962, assigned to Spirotechnique
- DE grant 1135281B, J.G.M.J. de Wouters d'Oplinter, "Photographische Kamera mit wasserdichtem Gehaeuse", issued August 23, 1962, assigned to Spirotechnique
- FR grant 1305450A, M. de Wouters d'Oplinter, "Mécanisme d'entraînement de film et de commande d'obturateur focal", issued October 5, 1962, assigned to Spirotechnique
- FR grant 79844E, M. de Wouters d'Oplinter, "Appareil photographique étanche à l'eau", issued February 1, 1963
- FR grant 80033E, M. de Wouters d'Oplinter, "Obturateur focal pour la photographie", issued March 1, 1963, assigned to Spirotechnique
- US grant 3109357A, J.G.M.J. de Wouters d'Oplinter, "Focal-plane photographic shutter", issued November 5, 1963
- US grant 3116672A, J.G.M.J. de Wouters d'Oplinter, "Photographic apparatus", issued January 7, 1964
- DE grant 1164821B, J.G.M.J. de Wouters d'Oplinter, "Schlitzverschluss mit starren Schiebern", issued March 5, 1964, assigned to Spirotechnique
- CH grant 377195A, J.G.M.J. de Wouters d'Oplinter, "Obturateur focal d'un objectif photographique", issued April 30, 1964, assigned to Spirotechnique
- US grant 3135183A, J.G.M.J. de Wouters d'Oplinter, "Photographic camera with focal-plane shutter", issued June 2, 1964
- US grant 3162106A, J.G.M.J. de Wouters d'Oplinter, "Water-tight photographic camera", issued December 22, 1964
- FR grant 1418807A, M. de Wouters d'Oplinter, "Appareil photographique permettant la prise de séries d'images distinctes sur les deux moitiés de la largeur d'un film", issued November 26, 1965
- DE grant 1192944B, J.G.M.J. de Wouters d'Oplinter, "Wasserdichtes Bullauge, insbesondere fuer Unterwassergeraete", issued May 13, 1965, assigned to Spirotechnique
- DE grant 1217781B, J.G.M.J. de Wouters d'Oplinter, "Einrichtung zur Anzeige der Schaerfentiefe an fotografischen Kameras", issued May 26, 1966, assigned to Spirotechnique
- DE grant 1238325B, J.G.M.J. de Wouters d'Oplinter, "Photographische Kamera mit einem in einer zur optischen Achse parallelen Ebene hin- und herschwenkbaren Betaetigungshebel fuer den Filmtransport, das Verschlussspannen und Verschlussausloesen", issued April 4, 1967, assigned to Spirotechnique
