= San Diego Underwater Photographic Society =

The San Diego Underwater Photographic Society (SDUPS) is a social club dedicated to the sport and pastime of underwater photography and videography. It is one of the earliest organizations ever to be dedicated to the promotion and advancement of the art and its techniques. SDUPS was first established on September 28, 1961, by underwater photographic pioneers Ron Church and Chuck Nicklin at San Diego's Diving Locker dive shop, formerly on Cass Street in Pacific Beach.

Membership covers all levels of underwater photography from beginning U/W photographers to amateurs, semi-professional and full-time professional underwater photographers, using a wide range of equipment and techniques. These include such varied techniques as film photography, digital photography, high-definition video and even the 3-D underwater IMAX technology of SDUPS members Howard and Michelle Hall (Under the Sea 3D, Coral Reef Adventure).

== Film Festival ==
SDUPS hosted the annual the San Diego Underwater Photographic Society Film Festival, now the San Diego Undersea Film Exhibition, showcasing short films on marine ecosystems, conservation efforts, and ocean life.
