= ACDSee =

Computer program for image organizing, viewing, and editing

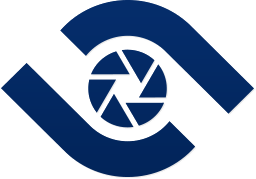
- Developer: ACD Systems
- Release: November 1994; 31 years ago

Stable release(s)
- ACDSee Home: 2027 (build (30.0.0.3620)) / 15 September 2026; 11 days ago
- ACDSee Professional: 2027 (build 20.0.0.3719) / 15 September 2026; 11 days ago
- ACDSee Ultimate: 2027 (build 20.0.0.4660) / 15 September 2026; 11 days ago
- ACDSee Photo Studio for Mac: 11 (build 11.0.2.3202) / 17 September 2025; 12 months ago
- ACDSee Free: 2.7.0.1530 / 15 September 2026; 11 days ago
- Operating system: Windows 10 and later; Mac OS X 10.13 and later; iOS 9.3 and later
- Size: ACDSee: 2 GB; ACDSee Pro: 2 GB; ACDSee Pro Mac: 4 GB; iOS: 96 MB
- Type: Image organizer, image viewer and image editor
- License: Trialware
- Website: acdsee.com

ACDSee is an image organizer, viewer, and image editor program for Windows, macOS and iOS, developed by ACD Systems International Inc. ACDSee was originally distributed as a 16-bit application for Windows 3.0 and later supplanted by a 32-bit version for Windows 95. ACDSee Pro 6 adds native 64-bit support. The newest versions of ACDSee incorporate modern Digital Asset Management tools like Face Detection & Facial Recognition (Ultimate 2019).

ACDSee's main features are speed, lossless RAW image editing, image batch processing, editing metadata (Exif and IPTC), rating, keywords, and categories, and geotagging. The image quality can be assessed quickly due to next/previous image caching, rapid RAW image decoding, and support for one-click toggling between 100% and fit screen zoom mode at any point within the image. Most of ACDSee's features can be accessed via keyboard.

ACDSee displays a tree view of the file structure for navigation with thumbnail images of the selected folder, and a preview of a selected image. ACDSee started as an image organizer/viewer, but over time had image editing and RAW development (Pro version) capabilities added. The thumbnails generated by ACDSee are cached, so that they do not need to be regenerated, and stored on disk as a database.

ACDSee's database can be backed up, and exported/imported as XML or binary. Each database and its associated thumbnails can also be loaded and saved as separate entities.

The photo manager is available as a consumer version, and a pro version which provides additional features, and additional image editing capabilities. In 2012, ACDSee Free was released, without advanced features.

== History ==
ACDSee was first released in 1994 as a 16-bit application for Windows 3.1. In 1997 32-bit ACDsee 95 was released for Windows 95. 1999 saw the release of ACDSee 3.0. Version 5.0 was released in 2002, and 7.0 in 2005. Development of this line continues, with version 20.0 released in 2016.

This early version of ACDSee is sometimes known as ACDSee Classic or ACDSee 32.

ACDSee Pro was released on 9 January 2006 aimed at professional photographers. ACD Systems decided to separate its core release, ACDSee Photo Manager, into two separate products; ACDSee Photo Manager, aimed at amateur photography enthusiasts, and ACDSee Pro which would target professionals by adding a new package of feature sets. ACDSee Pro's development team is based out of Victoria, British Columbia and was originally led by Jon McEwan, and more recently by Nels Anvik, who oversaw ACDSee Pro 2.5 through to Pro 5. The original ACDSee software was created by David Hooper, who also added a number of features to ACDSee Pro, such as Lighting correction (formerly known as Shadows and Highlights) and Develop Mode (in version 2.0). ACDSee Pro is written in C++, with the interface built using MFC.

== Free version ==
In August 2012, ACD Systems released ACDSee Free, which retains all viewing features for the most common image formats (BMP, GIF, JPEG, PNG, TGA, TIFF, WBMP, PCX, PIC, WMF, EMF); it lacks a thumbnail browser, and support for RAW and ICO formats. A reviewer at BetaNews found it "fast, configurable and easy to use". The version runs on Windows XP or newer. The product was discontinued in August 2013.

== See also ==
- Comparison of image viewers
