= ACD Systems =

Software companies of Canada

ACD Systems International Inc.
- Type: Software
- Founded: 1994
- Founder: Doug Vandekerkhove (CEO)
- Headquarters: Fort Lauderdale, Florida, United States & Victoria, British Columbia, Canada
- Key people: Frank Lin (CTO & GM); Martin Winstanley (VP Corporate Development); Mark Cosgrove (Director of Production); Peter Anderson (VP Sales & Business Development)
- Products: ACDSee

ACD (Advanced Creativity & Design) Systems is an independent digital image editing and management company with offices in the United States and Canada. The company was founded in 1994 in Texas by Doug Vandekerkhove. Its products include ACDSee photo editing and management software.

In April 2003, ACD Systems acquired all of the issued and outstanding shares of LINMOR Inc.'s wholly owned Canadian subsidiary for approximately CDN $2.1 million.
