= Jean de Wouters =

Belgian inventor and aeronautical engineer

Jean Guy Marie Josef chevalier de Wouters d'Oplinter (1905 – 1973) was a Belgian inventor and aeronautical engineer. He was born in Brussels. In 1957, he created the Calypso-Phot for Jacques-Yves Cousteau under their La Spirotechnique company name. It was later licensed to Nikon, where it became the Nikonos, (for a period sold in Europe as the Calypso-Nikkor). De Wouters apparently worked in aviation earlier in life, possibly during World War II, since he holds several patents for airplane improvements dating to that time period. He died in Rome in 1973.

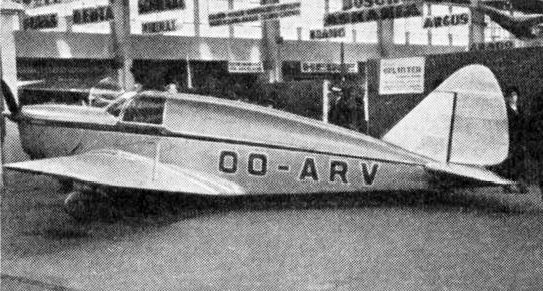
Jean de Wouters d'Oplinter W.4 photo from L'Aerophile June 1937
