= Enrichment =

Enrichment or enriched may refer to:

== Computing ==
- Data enrichment, appending data with context from other sources; see data management
- Enriched text, a text format for email

== Life sciences ==
- Behavioral enrichment, in animal care
- Environmental enrichment, in neuroscience
- Paradox of enrichment, in ecology
- Use of an enrichment culture to drive growth of a particular microorganism

== Other uses ==
- Enrichment factor, used to describe bodies of mineral ore
- Job enrichment, improving work processes and employee environments
- Nuclear enrichment, the process of increasing the concentration of nuclear fuel
- Unjust enrichment, in civil law
- Enriched category, in mathematics
- Chaptalization, a process in winemaking
- Food fortification, the process of adding nutrients to cereals or grain
- Enrichment in education, activities outside the formal curriculum
- Enrichment of breathing gas for scuba diving (e.g. in Enriched Air Nitrox)

== See also ==
- Cultural enrichment (disambiguation)
- GO Term Enrichment, in biology
- Enrich (comics) (1929–2023), Spanish comic writer
