= John Morgan Wells =

Physiologist, aquanaut and researcher (1940–2017)

Morgan Wells
- Morgan Wells in 1965 on the Sealab project
- Born: John Morgan Wells; April 12, 1940; Hopewell, Virginia, U.S.
- Died: July 28, 2017 (aged 77); Matthews, Virginia, U.S.
- Education: Randolph-Macon College; Scripps Institution of Oceanography
- Scientific career
- Fields: Diving medicine, Diver training
- Workplaces: NOAA
- Thesis: Pressure and Hemoglobin Oxygenation (1969)

John Morgan Wells (April 12, 1940 - July 28, 2017) was a marine biologist, and physiologist involved in the development of decompression systems for deep diving, and the use of nitrox as a breathing gas for diving. He is known for developing the widely used NOAA Nitrox I (32% O2/N2) and II (36% O2/N2) mixtures and their decompression tables in the late 1970s, the deep diving mixture of oxygen, helium, and nitrogen known as NOAA Trimix I, for research in undersea habitats, where divers live and work under pressure for extended periods, and for training diving physicians and medical technicians in hyperbaric medicine.

== Background ==
At 14, Wells made his first surface-supplied diving system from a spray painting compressor powered by a motor-scooter engine, and later built an oxygen rebreather from surplus aircraft respirator parts based on diagrams in the U.S. Navy Diving Manual, which he used for several years. He later switched to open circuit air diving and taught scuba diving while in college.

Wells received his PhD in physiology from Scripps Institution of Oceanography (University of California, San Diego). His thesis is titled "Pressure and Hemoglobin Oxygenation".

While at Scripps he trained as a scientific diver before joining the US Navy "Man in the Sea" project, where he was trained in rebreather and mixed gas diving. In 1965, he was an aquanaut on SeaLab II, Team 3 along with team-leader Robert Sheats on a 15-day, 205 foot (62 m) helium/oxygen saturation dive.

== Career ==
Wells worked for NOAA for 23 years, starting soon after NOAA was established. He was appointed director of the NOAA Diving Program in 1978 and in 1989 created the NOAA Experimental Diving Unit where he worked with divers like Dick Rutkowski with whom he developed the use of Nitrox in diving.

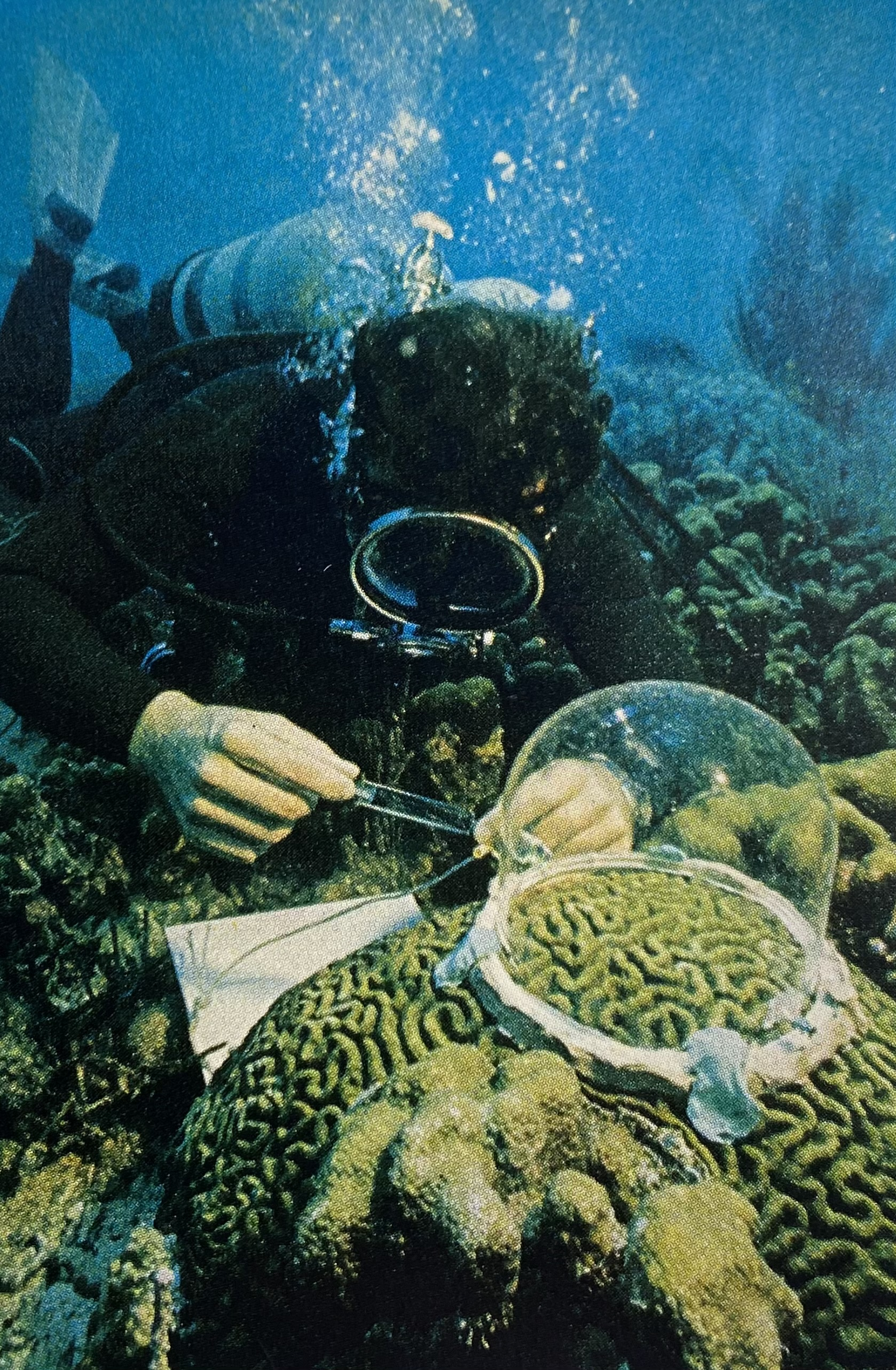
Mission: Tektite II Dr Morgan Wells, diving, fixing a dome over a specimen.

In 1970, he introduced the concept of Equivalent Air Depth (EAD). Wells developed diving procedures for oxygen-enriched air throughout the 1970s, and published a standard for Nitrox I in 1978, followed by the Nitrox II standard in 1990, and wrote many articles on the use of Nitrox in diving. He later developed the NOAA Trimix I standard mixture of oxygen, helium, and nitrogen used in deep diving.

Wells was also known for conducting research in undersea habitats, and is credited with having spent more time as an aquanaut, and having lived in more underwater habitats than any other person. He worked in Sealab II, Tektite, Edalhab, Hydrolab, PRINUL, Helgoland (Germany), and LORA (Canadian, under ice) habitats. He also served as operations director for special missions of Hydrolab and Helgoland in U.S. waters. In 1993, he developed dive procedures and safety plan for examination of the wreck of the USS Monitor.

In 1993, he developed dive procedures and safety plan for examination of the wreck of the USS Monitor.

Wells was a resident physiologist at Wrightsville Marine Bio-Med Laboratory, North Carolina from 1969 to 1972, and in 1970 and 1972 he was Assistant Professor of Physiology at the School of Medicine, University of North Carolina. From 1972 to 1979 he was Science Coordinator for Marine Biology at the Manned Undersea Science and Technology Office. From 1979 to 1991 he was Director of the Diving Program, and from 1984 to 1985 Guest Scientist at the Naval Medical Research Institution, and from 1991 to retirement in 1995, Director of the NOAA Experimental Diving Unit.

Wells started an advanced training course in hyperbaric medicine for physicians at the NOAA Diving Center in Seattle, which he presented for several years.

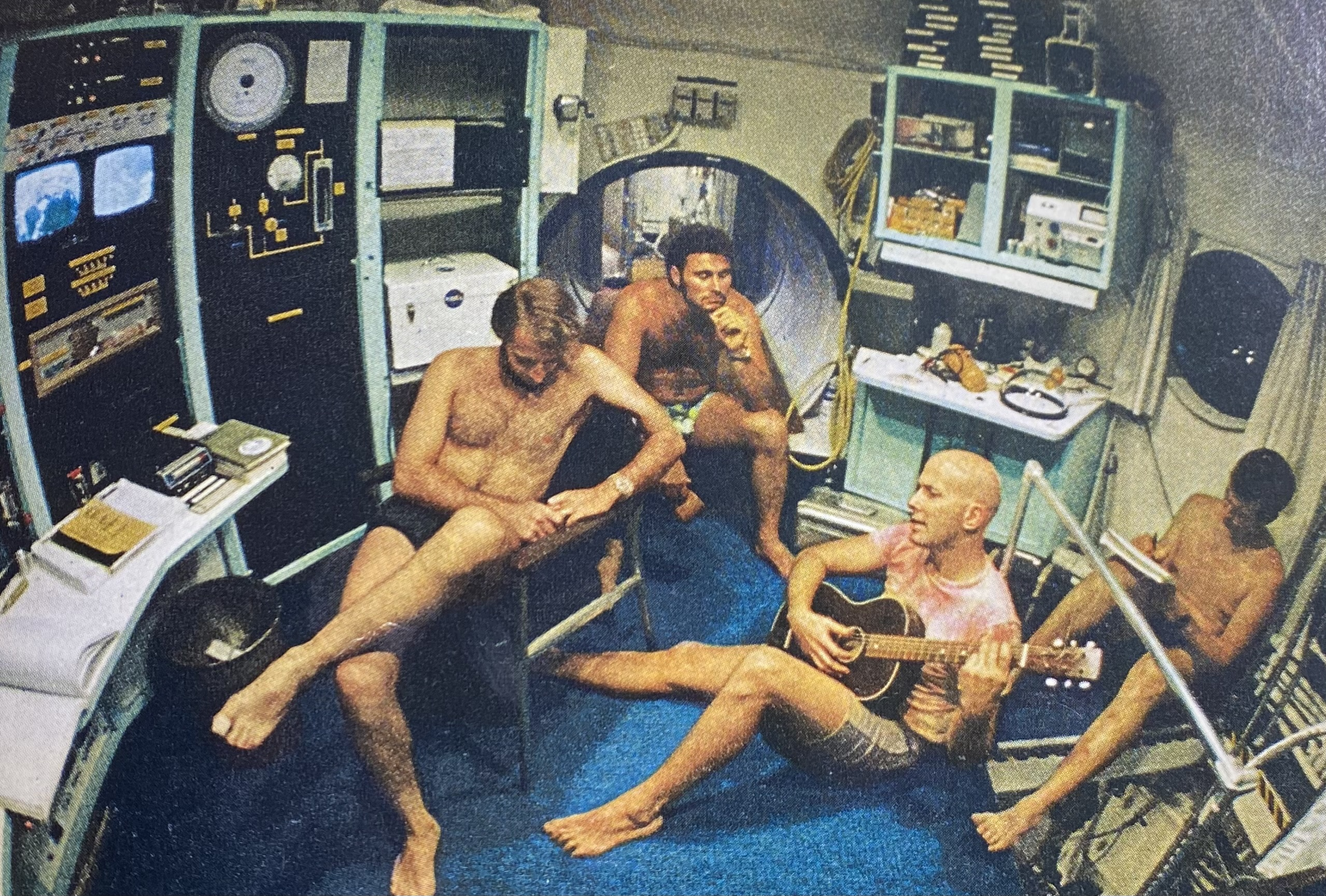
Tektite II, inside the habitat. From left to right; Richard Chesher, Dr Morgan Wells, Lawrence McCloskey and unknown.

== Safety and training ==
Wells, Jim Devereaux and Charlie Depping founded the Undersea Research Foundation, which Wells was involved in after retiring from NOAA. Its BAYLAB research facility was developed in 1991 to educate people about underwater life in Chesapeake Bay.

Wells was a member of the International Board of Advisors of IAND, Inc./IANTD; Chief Scientist for the Scientific Cooperative Operational Research Foundation (SCORE); member of the Undersea and Hyperbaric Medical Society, the American Academy of Underwater Sciences and National Association of Diver Medical Technology.

== Awards ==
- In 1993 he received the Leonard Greenstone Diving Safety Award from NAUI Ethics and Quality Assurance.
- U.S. Navy Meritorious Public Service Citation for actions during SeaLab.
- Society of American Military Engineers Colbert Medal for contributions to contaminated water diving.
- Underwater Society of America NOGI Award for diving education.

== Publications ==
- Wells, J. Morgan. NOAA Diving Safety Bulletin #79-1. Subject: Unsafe practice; Recommended Regulations Change; Definition of a “Dive.” n.d.
- Wells, J. Morgan. NOAA Diving Safety Bulletin 89-1. Subject: NOAA Diving Physical Readiness Testing Program. September 20, 1988.
- Wells, J. Morgan. NOAA Diving Safety Bulletin #90-4. Subject: U.S. Divers Regulator Failure. October 5, 1990.
- Wells, J. Morgan. NOAA Diving Safety Bulletin #90-5. Subject: Scubapro Air II System Failures. October 16, 1990.
- Wells, J.Morgan. NOAA Diving Safety Bulletin #93-02. Subject: Changes to U.S. Navy Dive Tables. November 22, 1993.
- Wells, J. Morgan. The Use of Nitrogen-Oxygen Mixtures as Divers Breathing Gas. [Rockville, MD]: NOAA, NOAA Diving Program, n.d.
- Wells, John Morgan. Pressure and Hemoglobin Oxygenation. Thesis – University of California, 1969.
