= Riches =

Riches may refer to:

- Wealth
- Riches (TV series), British television drama
- The Riches (television series)
- Riches (album), a 1988 album by Deacon Blue
- Riches & More, a compilation album by Deacon Blue
- People with the surname Riches:
  - Tom Hurry Riches (1846–1911), British engineer
  - Norman Riches (1883–1975), Welsh cricketer
  - Leonard W. Riches (1939–2024), American Anglican bishop

== See also ==
- Rich (disambiguation)
