= Rich people =

Rich people may refer to:

- Rich People (EP)
- Rich People (film)

== See also ==
- High-net-worth individual, financial industry term for people whose investible assets exceed some threshold
- Lists of people by net worth
- Rich People Problems, 2017 novel by Singaporean writer Kevin Kwan
- Rich (disambiguation)
