= Lean air =

Gas mixture with less than 21% oxygen in nitrigen

Lean air is a gas mixture with an oxygen content lower than 20.95% (the oxygen content of the normal breathing air). Lean air is made from a gas mixture of air with nitrogen or of pure oxygen with nitrogen and is used in several production processes where a product covering with pure nitrogen can be dangerous, undesirable or more expensive. In some production processes the oxygen content is necessary for the reaction process or during storage (e.g. synthetic resin production, acrylic compounds such as acrylic acid (CAAC) or butyl acrylate (BA)).

== Definition ==
Lean air is artificially produced "air" with a lower oxygen content. The normal oxygen content of 20.95 Vol .-% in air is reduced (leaned) to a lower proportion (e.g. 8 Vol.-%). For this purpose gases are mixed: Either compressed air with nitrogen or oxygen with nitrogen.

The generic term for Lean air is synthetic air which can refer to gas mixtures with a lower but also with a higher content of oxygen. Synthetic air is used e.g. used for gas analyzers as zero gas or operating gas for the detection of nitrogen oxides. In large scaled chemical processes the gas mixture is used in significantly larger quantities and there has an impact on product quality.

== Usage ==
Lean air is often required in processes for the supply of solvent boilers and reactors, e.g. in the production of synthetic resins during Polymerization. In these processes, heat is added and combustible gases escape from the product. Three required factors of the combustion triangle (combustible substance, oxygen, ignition energy) would coincide spatially and temporally if produced under normal breathing air. This could lead to an explosion or deflagration, with consequent serious accidents.

If the product is acrylic acid, in opposite oxygen must be present and pure inert atmosphere must be avoided: "Overheating of Acrylic Acid must be avoided because this can lead to explosions." "Several case histories of Acrylic Acid were reported when procedures for proper handling or storage were disregarded." "Overlaying Acrylic Acid with a pure nitrogen atmosphere during the manufacturing process can lead to oxygen depletion" and in consequence to explosion. Even storage leads to chemical reaction requiring oxygen. "Oxygen is consumed slowly during storage. Therefore the level of dissolved oxygen should be periodically replenished with air (or an oxygen/nitrogen gas mixture, 'lean air mixture')." Thus the lean air, used for this purpose, has to be kept in a safe oxygen range so that accidents are prevented and at the same time that the reaction can take place.

Due to the regular use in potentially explosive areas, compliance with the oxygen content specified for the lean air, i.e. both for the quality of the production process (desired chemical reaction) and for safety-related matters (combustion triangle, overheating), is essential.

Lean air can be filled in gas cylinders (or bundles as storage banks) from manufacturers of technical gases . When larger quantities are required, companies tend to operate their own systems for generating lean air because this is more cost effective. Systems for production of such gas mixtures are called gas mixers, or more specific lean air units. The demands of those lean air units for quantity, quality, security and availability are individually graded and are defined by company-specific needs and budgets.

== Generation of lean air ==
Gas quality, safety and availability are important for the process when generating lean air. That means in detail

- Control of the defined oxygen concentration in the lean air-gas mixture for the production of a constant product quality (quality)
- Safe shutdown if a specified oxygen concentration is exceeded or undercut so that there is no risk of explosion (safety)
- Using backup solutions or a bypass with pure nitrogen or pre-mixed gas, ensuring the availability of the production system (availability)

=== Quality ===
As an additional measure to monitor the correct gas mixture quality, a gas analyzer can be used that continuously monitors the oxygen concentration. The measured oxygen value can be displayed and transferred to a higher-level process control system via an online connection. If the limit value is exceeded, a change in the quality of the gas mixture (in the case of automatic, dynamic lean air systems) can be initiated, and a shutdown or a switchover to a possibly existing bypass can be initiated.

=== Safety ===
The safe compliance with a defined oxygen concentration in the lean air influences the safety of the supplied process plant. Functional safety can be additionally increased by using a Safety Integrity Level analysis (SIL analysis). A SIL or security level is a security requirement level in accordance with the standard IEC 61508 / IEC 61511. The monitoring system used for this (usually consisting of a gas analyzer, shutdown, blow-off line solenoid valve) is assessed jointly with regard to its reliability by this SIL analysis. This further reduces the risk of potential malfunctions.

=== Availability ===
To ensure the availability of a professionally designed lean air system, at least the following measures are common:

- Gas filter on the gas inlet side, to avoid impairment of the functioning of the fittings by particle entry,
- Pressure control of compressed air and nitrogen to the same mixed pressure, so that Avogadro's law of the ideal gas applies, i.e. the density of the gases is proportional to the molar mass at the same pressure and temperature,
- Interconnection of the constant pressure regulators in the gas inlet lines so that the impermissible enrichment of admixing gas is excluded at any time. Additional locking via the gas analysis so that a redundant safety lock is created.
- Volume flow measurement (temperature and pressure compensated),
- Use of gas non-return valves in each individual gas line to prevent decanting,
- Enabling continuous or discontinuous gas mixture consumption through design measures,
- Ensuring autonomous plant operation, even in the event of an eventual fault in a higher-level process control system or in the communication with it.

== See also ==
- Nitrox – Breathing gas, mixture of nitrogen and oxygen
- Gas blending – Producing special gas mixtures to specification
- Breathing gas – Gas used for human respiration
- Pressure swing adsorption – Method of gases separation using selective adsorption under pressure
- Membrane gas separation – Technology for splitting specific gases out of mixtures
