= Rich =

Rich may refer to:

== Common uses ==
- Rich, an entity possessing wealth
- Rich, an intense flavor, color, sound, texture, or feeling
  - Rich (wine), a descriptor in wine tasting

== Places ==
=== United States ===
- Rich, Mississippi, an unincorporated community
- Rich County, Utah
- Rich Mountain (disambiguation)
- Rich Township, Cook County, Illinois
- Rich Township, Anderson County, Kansas
- Rich Township, Lapeer County, Michigan

=== Elsewhere ===
- Er-Rich, Morocco, a town
- Rich River, Victoria, Australia

== People ==
- Rich (given name), including a list of people and fictional characters with the name
- Rich (surname)

== Arts, entertainment, and media ==
=== Fictional characters ===
- DS Terry Rich, a character in the British soap opera EastEnders
- Rich, a character in the American sitcom television series The Hogan Family
- Rich Halke, a character in the TV sitcom Step by Step
- Rich Hardbeck, a character in the British television series Skins
- Rich Millar, a character in the British soap opera Doctors
- Richie Rich (character), a fictional character

=== Music ===
- Rich, half of the American country music duo Big & Rich
- Rich Velonskis, half of the American duo Nikki & Rich
- "Rich" (Maren Morris song), 2018
- "Rich", a song by Jawbreaker from Etc., 2002
- "Rich", a song by K. Michelle, from More Issues Than Vogue, 2016
- "Rich", a song by Kendrick Lamar, from Mr. Morale & The Big Steppers, 2022
- "Rich", a song by Kirko Bangz, 2014
- "Rich", a song by M.I from The Chairman, 2014
- "Rich", a song by Megan Thee Stallion from Suga, 2020
- "Rich", a song by the Yeah Yeah Yeahs from Fever to Tell, 2003

=== Television ===
- "Rich" (Skins), an episode of the television series Skins

== Businesses ==
- B.C. Rich, guitar manufacturer
- Rich & Cowan, UK book publishing company
- Rich International Airways, former U.S. airline
- Rich Products, international food products corporation
- Rich's (department store), U.S. department store chain in the southern U.S.
- Rich's (discount store), U.S. discount store chain in the northeastern U.S.

== Navy ships ==
- USS Rich (DD-820), a Gearing-class destroyer in the Korean War and Vietnam War
- USS Rich (DE-695), a Buckley-class destroyer escort in World War II

== Science and technology ==
- Rich, in combustion engines, refers to an air-fuel ratio which has an excess amount of fuel beyond what is required for complete combustion
- Ring imaging Cherenkov detector, a particle detector
- Dongfeng Rich, a pickup truck series
- Rich-Twin 1-X-A, a 1939 American civil aircraft

== Titles ==
- Baron Rich, an extinct title in the Peerage of England
- Rich baronets, four titles, three of which are extinct and one dormant

== See also ==
- List of people known as the Rich
- Enrichment (disambiguation)
- Species richness
- Richard (disambiguation)
- Ritchie (disambiguation)
- Rishi (disambiguation)
- Richie
