= Rich Mountain =

Rich Mountain may refer to the following:

Mountains in the United States:

- Rich Mountain (Georgia)
- Rich Mountain (Watauga County, North Carolina), NW of Boone, Watauga County, NC
- Rich Mountain (Moses Cone Park, North Carolina), SSW of Boone, Watauga County, NC
- Rich Mountain Bald (Watauga County, North Carolina), NNW of Boone, Watauga County, NC
- Rich Mountain (Virginia) in the state of Virginia
- Rich Mountain (Tygart Valley River) bordering the Tygart Valley River in western Randolph County, West Virginia
- Rich Mountain (Arkansas–Oklahoma) (2,160 ft/800 m) straddling the Arkansas–Oklahoma state border

Other:

- Rich Mountain (Frederick, Maryland), a house on the National Register of Historic Places near Frederick, Maryland

== See also ==
- Battle of Rich Mountain, West Virginia
