= Enrichment factor =

Concentration of a mineral in ore

In mineralogy, the enrichment factor is the concentration of a mineral in ore. It is defined as the minimum factor by which the weight percent of mineral in an orebody is greater than the average occurrence of that mineral in the Earth's crust. It can be used to compare the necessary enrichment of different types of minerals for their recovery to be economically viable.

== Determining enrichment factors ==
Enrichment factors affect the economic viability of an orebody in the following ways:

- The value of the mineral (the higher the value of the recovered mineral the more expensive the recovery process can be in order to obtain it - this could include processing larger amounts of ore)
- The level of the technology available to recover the mineral (any advances in technology may allow ores with lower wt% mineral to be exploited for the same cost)
- The cost of refining the mineral once recovered (this may require the bulk of the price demanded by the final product, so leaving little margin for the initial recovery of the mineral)
- Other macro-economic factors (such as fuel prices if the mineral requires a large amount of transportation or energy prices if the recovery and refinement process is inherently energy intensive)

== Other applications of enrichment factor ==
- The enrichment factor can also be used to talk about the level of radioactive isotopes in uranium, or the level of minerals in soil.
- The same concept is used in bioinformatics for gene analysis, to measure the added value of a search tool over another one or over the homogeneous distribution in the genome population.
