= Equivalent air depth =

Method of comparing decompression requirements for air and a given nitrox mix

The equivalent air depth (EAD) is a way of approximating the decompression requirements of breathing gas mixtures that contain nitrogen and oxygen in different proportions to those in air, known as nitrox.

The equivalent air depth, for a given nitrox mix and depth, is the depth of a dive when breathing air that would have the same partial pressure of nitrogen. So, for example, a gas mix containing 36% oxygen (EAN36) being used at 27 metres (89 ft) has an EAD of 20 metres (66 ft).

== Calculations in metres ==
The equivalent air depth can be calculated for depths in metres as follows:

EAD = (Depth + 10) × (Fraction of N_{2} / 0.79) − 10

Working the earlier example, for a nitrox mix containing 64% nitrogen (EAN36) being used at 27 metres, the EAD is:

EAD = (27 + 10) × (0.64 / 0.79) − 10

EAD = 37 × 0.81 − 10

EAD = 30 − 10

EAD = 20 metres

So at 27 metres on this mix, the diver would calculate their decompression requirements as if on air at 20 metres.

== Calculations in feet ==
The equivalent air depth can be calculated for depths in feet as follows:

EAD = (Depth + 33) × (Fraction of N_{2} / 0.79) − 33

Working the earlier example, for a nitrox mix containing 64% nitrogen (EAN36) being used at 90 feet, the EAD is:

EAD = (90 + 33) × (0.64 / 0.79) − 33

EAD = 123 × 0.81 − 33

EAD = 100 − 33

EAD = 67 feet

So at 90 feet on this mix, the diver would calculate their decompression requirements as if on air at 67 feet.

== Derivation of the formulas ==
For a given nitrox mixture and a given depth, the equivalent air depth expresses the theoretical depth that would produce the same partial pressure of nitrogen if regular air (79% nitrogen) was used instead:

$$ppN_2(nitrox, depth) = ppN_2(air, EAD)$$

Hence, following the definition of partial pressure:

$$FN_2(nitrox) \cdot P_{depth} = FN_2(air) \cdot P_{EAD}$$

with $FN_2$ expressing the fraction of nitrogen and $P_{depth}$ expressing the pressure at the given depth. Solving for $P_{EAD}$ then yields a general formula:

$$P_{EAD} = {FN_2(nitrox) \over FN_2(air)} \cdot P_{depth}$$

In this formula, $P_{EAD}\,$ and $P_{depth}\,$ are absolute pressures. In practice, it is much more convenient to work with the equivalent columns of seawater depth, because the depth can be read off directly from the depth gauge or dive computer. The relationship between pressure and depth is governed by Pascal's law:

$$P_{depth} = P_{atmosphere} + \rho_{seawater} \cdot g \cdot h_{depth}\,$$

Using the SI system with pressures expressed in pascal, we have:

$$P_{depth}(Pa) = P_{atmosphere}(Pa) + \rho_{seawater} \cdot g \cdot h_{depth}(m)\,$$

Expressing the pressures in atmospheres yields a convenient formula (1 atm ≡ 101325 Pa):

$$P_{depth}(atm) = 1 + \frac{\rho_{seawater} \cdot g \cdot h_{depth}}{P_{atmosphere}(Pa)} = 1 + \frac{1027 \cdot 9.8 \cdot h_{depth}}{101325}\ \approx 1 + \frac{h_{depth}(m)}{10}$$

To simplify the algebra we will define $\frac{FN_2(nitrox)}{FN_2(air)} = R$. Combining the general formula and Pascal's law, we have:

$$1 + \frac{h_{EAD}}{10} = R \cdot (1 + \frac{h_{depth}}{10})$$

so that

$$h_{EAD} = 10 \cdot (R + R \cdot \frac{h_{depth}}{10} - 1) = R \cdot (h_{depth} + 10) - 10$$

Since $h(ft) \approx 3.3 \cdot h (m)\,$, the equivalent formula for the imperial system becomes

$$h_{EAD}(ft) = 3.3 \cdot \Bigl(R \cdot (\frac{h_{depth}(ft)}{3.3} + 10) - 10 \Bigr) = R \cdot (h_{depth}(ft) + 33) - 33$$

Substituting R again, and noting that $FN_2(air) = 0.79$, we have the concrete formulas:

$$h_{EAD}(m) = \frac{FN_2(nitrox)}{0.79} \cdot (h_{depth}(m) + 10) - 10$$

$$h_{EAD}(ft) = \frac{FN_2(nitrox)}{0.79} \cdot (h_{depth}(ft) + 33) - 33$$

== Dive tables ==
Although not all dive tables are recommended for use in this way, the Bühlmann tables are suitable for use with these kind of calculations. At 27 metres depth the Bühlmann 1986 table (for altitudes of 0–700 m) allows 20 minutes bottom time without requiring a decompression stop, while at 20 metres the no-stop time is 35 minutes. This shows that using EAN36 for a 27-metre dive can give a 75% increase in no-stop bottom time over using air at the same theoretical level of risk of developing symptoms of decompression sickness.

US Navy tables have also been used with equivalent air depth, with similar effect. The calculations are theoretically valid for all Haldanean decompression models.
