= Rich Mountain (Moses Cone Park, North Carolina) =

Mountain in North Carolina, United States

- Location within North Carolina

Highest point
- Elevation: 4,246 ft (1,294 m)
- Coordinates: 36°10′14″N 81°42′31″W

Geography
- Location: Watauga County, North Carolina, U.S.
- Parent range: Blue Ridge Mountains
- Topo map: USGS Boone

Rich Mountain is roughly 7 miles (11 km) south-southwest of Boone, in Moses H. Cone Memorial Park. Its elevation reaches 4,246 feet (1,294 m). Because it's within the Blue Ridge Parkway, it is protected from development. From 1922-1985, Camp Yonahlossee (Cherokee for "Trail of the Bear") was located at the western side of the mountain, it was one of the oldest all girls camp in North Carolina; today it is a resort and club.

The mountain generates several feeder streams to the South Fork New River (via Winkler Creek) and the Watauga River (via Cannon Branch).
