= Cultural enrichment =

Cultural enrichment can refer to:

- The generally understood objective within Arts in education to expose children to the arts
- Culture change, a term used in public policy making that regards the role of culture on individual and community behavior
- Cultural pluralism, when a society has subset groups that maintain a unique cultural identity and values
  - Acculturation, a process of culture change that describes how members of a minority culture adapt to the prevailing societal culture
  - Multiculturalism, a term in sociology which is synonymous with ethnic pluralism
- Cultural diffusion, a concept by Leo Frobenius where culture is shared between individuals
- Cultural diplomacy, a type of diplomacy which is a cultural exchange among different nations
- Cultural appropriation, the adoption of elements from one culture by members of another

== See also ==
- Polyculturalism
- Culture (disambiguation)
