= Nitrox =

Breathing gas, mixture of nitrogen and oxygen

Nitrox refers to any gas mixture composed of nitrogen and oxygen (plus trace gases). It is usually used for mixtures that contain less than 78% nitrogen by volume. In the usual application, underwater diving, nitrox is normally distinguished from air and handled differently. The most common use of nitrox mixtures containing oxygen in higher proportions than atmospheric air is in scuba diving, where the reduced partial pressure of nitrogen is advantageous in reducing nitrogen uptake in the body's tissues, thereby extending the practicable underwater dive time by reducing the decompression requirement, or reducing the risk of decompression sickness (also known as the bends). The two most common recreational diving nitrox mixes are 32% and 36% oxygen, which have maximum operating depths of about 110 feet (34 meters) and 95 feet (29 meters) respectively.

Nitrox is used to a lesser extent in surface-supplied diving, as these advantages are reduced by the more complex logistical requirements for nitrox compared to the use of simple low-pressure compressors for breathing gas supply. Nitrox can also be used in hyperbaric treatment of decompression illness, usually at pressures where pure oxygen would be hazardous. Nitrox is not a safer gas than compressed air in all respects; although its use can reduce the risk of decompression sickness, it increases the risks of oxygen toxicity and fire.

Though not generally referred to as nitrox, an oxygen-enriched air mixture is routinely provided at normal surface ambient pressure as oxygen therapy to patients with compromised respiration and circulation.

== Physiological effects under pressure ==
=== Decompression benefits ===
Reducing the proportion of nitrogen by increasing the proportion of oxygen reduces the risk of decompression sickness for the same dive profile, or allows extended dive times without increasing the need for decompression stops for the same risk. The significant aspect of extended no-stop time when using nitrox mixtures is reduced risk in a situation where breathing gas supply is compromised, as the diver can make a direct ascent to the surface with an acceptably low risk of decompression sickness. The exact values of the extended no-stop times vary depending on the decompression model used to derive the tables, but as an approximation, it is based on the partial pressure of nitrogen at the dive depth. This principle can be used to calculate an equivalent air depth (EAD) with the same partial pressure of nitrogen as the mix to be used, and this depth is less than the actual dive depth for oxygen enriched mixtures. The equivalent air depth is used with air decompression tables to calculate decompression obligation and no-stop times. The Goldman decompression model predicts a significant risk reduction by using nitrox (more so than the PADI tables suggest).

=== Nitrogen narcosis ===
Controlled tests have not shown breathing nitrox to reduce the effects of nitrogen narcosis, as oxygen seems to have similarly narcotic properties under pressure to nitrogen; thus one should not expect a reduction in narcotic effects due only to the use of nitrox. (Note: Oxygen has the potential to be 1.7 times more narcotic than nitrogen – see relevant narcotic potency of gases.) Nonetheless, there are people in the diving community who insist that they feel reduced narcotic effects at depths breathing nitrox. This may be due to a dissociation of the subjective and behavioural effects of narcosis. Although oxygen appears chemically more narcotic at the surface, relative narcotic effects at depth have never been studied in detail, but it is known that different gases produce different narcotic effects as depth increases. Helium has no narcotic effect, but results in HPNS when breathed at high pressures, which does not happen with gases that have greater narcotic potency. However, because of risks associated with oxygen toxicity, divers do not usually use nitrox at greater depths where more pronounced narcosis symptoms are more likely to occur. For deep diving, trimix or heliox gases are typically used; these gases contain helium to reduce the amount of narcotic gases in the mixture.

=== Oxygen toxicity ===
Diving with and handling nitrox raise a number of potentially fatal dangers due to the high partial pressure of oxygen (ppO_{2}). Nitrox is not a deep-diving gas mixture owing to the increased proportion of oxygen, which becomes toxic when breathed at high pressure. For example, the maximum operating depth of nitrox with 36% oxygen, a popular recreational diving mix, is 29 metres (95 ft) to ensure a maximum ppO_{2} of no more than 1.4 bar (140 kPa). The exact value of the maximum allowed ppO_{2} and maximum operating depth varies depending on factors such as the training agency, the type of dive, the breathing equipment and the level of surface support, with professional divers sometimes being allowed to breathe higher ppO_{2} than those recommended to recreational divers.

To dive safely with nitrox, the diver must learn good buoyancy control, a vital part of scuba diving in its own right, and a disciplined approach to preparing, planning and executing a dive to ensure that the ppO_{2} is known, and the maximum operating depth is not exceeded. Many dive shops, dive operators, and gas blenders (individuals trained to blend gases) require the diver to present a nitrox certification card before selling nitrox to divers.Additionally, it is strongly encouraged for divers to confirm the percentage of oxygen in their tank before every dive, regardless of the specified amount on their tank. This is done by expelling a small amount of air from the diver's tank into an oxygen analyzer. This is to further limit the possibility of oxygen toxicity due to errors in previous testing.

Some training agencies, such as PADI and Technical Diving International, teach the use of two depth limits to protect against oxygen toxicity. The shallower depth is called the "maximum operating depth" and is reached when the partial pressure of oxygen in the breathing gas reaches 1.4 bar (140 kPa). The deeper depth, called the "contingency depth", is reached when the partial pressure reaches 1.6 bar (160 kPa). Diving at or beyond this level exposes the diver to a greater risk of central nervous system (CNS) oxygen toxicity. This can be extremely dangerous since its onset is often without warning and can lead to drowning, as the regulator may be spat out during convulsions, which occur in conjunction with sudden unconsciousness (general seizure induced by oxygen toxicity).

Divers trained to use nitrox may memorise the acronym VENTID-C or sometimes ConVENTID, (which stands for Vision (blurriness), Ears (ringing sound), Nausea, Twitching, Irritability, Dizziness, and Convulsions). However, evidence from non-fatal oxygen convulsions indicates that most convulsions are not preceded by any warning symptoms at all. Further, many of the suggested warning signs are also symptoms of nitrogen narcosis, and so may lead to misdiagnosis by a diver. A solution to either is to ascend to a shallower depth.

=== Carbon dioxide retention ===
Use of nitrox may cause a reduced ventilatory response, and when breathing dense gas at the deeper limits of the usable range, this may result in carbon dioxide retention when exercise levels are high, with an increased risk of loss of consciousness.

=== Other effects ===
There is anecdotal evidence that the use of nitrox reduces post-dive fatigue, particularly in older and or obese divers; however a double-blind study to test this found no statistically significant reduction in reported fatigue. There was, however, some suggestion that post-dive fatigue is due to sub-clinical decompression sickness (DCS) (i.e. micro bubbles in the blood insufficient to cause symptoms of DCS); the fact that the study mentioned was conducted in a dry chamber with an ideal decompression profile may have been sufficient to reduce sub-clinical DCS and prevent fatigue in both nitrox and air divers. In 2008, a study was published using wet divers at the same depth no statistically significant reduction in reported fatigue was seen.

Further studies with a number of different dive profiles, and also different levels of exertion, would be necessary to fully investigate this issue. For example, there is much better scientific evidence that breathing high-oxygen gases increases exercise tolerance, during aerobic exertion. Though even moderate exertion while breathing from the regulator is a relatively uncommon occurrence in recreational scuba, as divers usually try to minimize it in order to conserve gas, episodes of exertion while regulator-breathing do occasionally occur in recreational diving. Examples are surface-swimming a distance to a boat or beach after surfacing, where residual "safety" cylinder gas is often used freely, since the remainder will be wasted anyway when the dive is completed, and unplanned contingencies due to currents or buoyancy problems. It is possible that these so-far un-studied situations have contributed to some of the positive reputation of nitrox.

A 2010 study using critical flicker fusion frequency and perceived fatigue criteria found that diver alertness after a dive on nitrox was significantly better than after an air dive.

== Uses ==
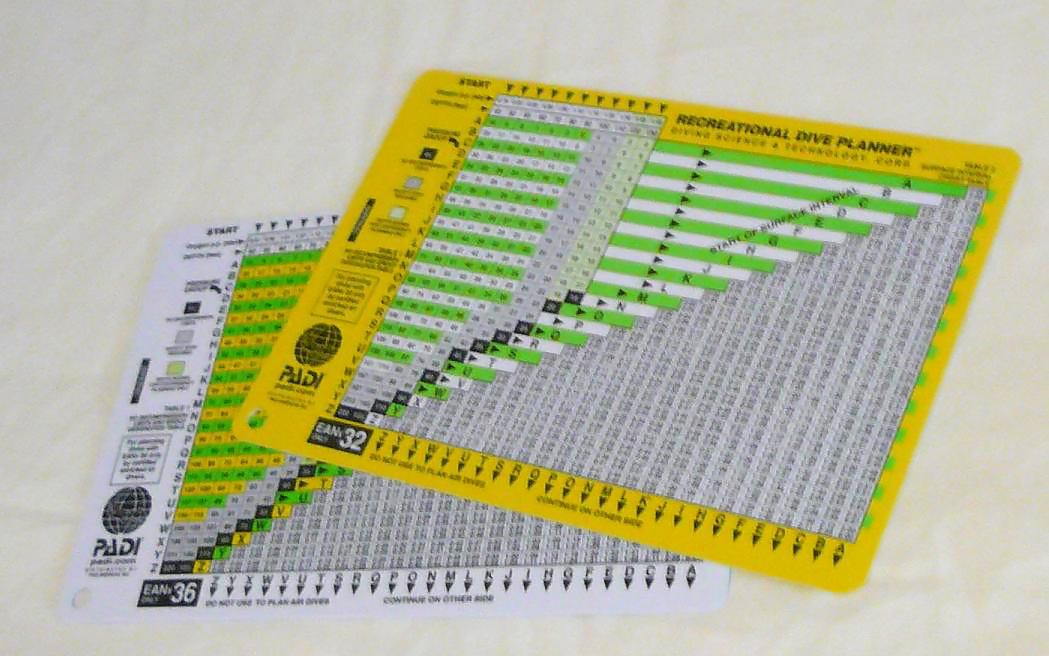
Enriched Air Nitrox diving tables, showing adjusted no-decompression times.

=== Underwater diving ===
Enriched Air Nitrox, nitrox with an oxygen content above 21%, is mainly used in scuba diving to reduce the proportion of nitrogen in the breathing gas mixture. The main benefit is reduced decompression risk. To a considerably lesser extent it is also used in surface supplied diving, where the logistics are relatively complex, similar to the use of other diving gas mixtures like heliox and trimix.

==== Training and certification ====
Recreational nitrox certification (Nitrox diver) allows the diver to use a single nitrox gas mixture with 40% or less oxygen by volume on a dive without obligatory decompression. The reason for using nitrox on this type of dive profile can be to extend the no-decompression limit, and for shorter dives, to reduce the decompression stress. The course is short, with a theory module on the risks of oxygen toxicity and the calculation of maximum operating depth, and a practical module of generally two dives using nitrox. It is one of the most popular further training programmes for entry level divers as it makes longer dives possible at a large number of popular sites. Gases suitable for this application may be referred to as recreational nitrox.

Advanced nitrox certification (Advanced nitrox diver) requires competence to carry two nitrox mixtures in separate scuba sets, and to use the richer mix for accelerated decompression at the end of the dive, switching gases underwater at the correct planned depth and selecting the new gas on the dive computer if one is carried. For the purposes of the certification any mixture from air to nominally 100% oxygen may be used, though at least one agency prefers to limit oxygen fraction to 80% as they consider this has a lower risk for acute oxygen toxicity.

=== Therapeutic recompression ===
Nitrox50 is used as one of the options in the first stages of therapeutic recompression using the Comex therapeutic table CX 30 for treatment of vestibular or general decompression sickness. Nitrox is breathed at 30 msw and 24 msw and the ascents from these depths to the next stop. At 18 m the gas is switched to oxygen for the rest of the treatment.

=== Medicine, mountaineering and unpressurised aircraft ===
The use of oxygen at high altitudes or as oxygen therapy may be as supplementary oxygen, added to the inspired air, which would technically be a use of nitrox, blended on site, but this is not normally referred to as such, as the gas provided for the purpose is oxygen.

== Terminology ==
Nitrox is known by many names: Enriched Air Nitrox, Oxygen Enriched Air, Nitrox, EANx or Safe Air. Since the word is a compound contraction or coined word and not an acronym, it should not be written in all upper case characters as "NITROX", but may be initially capitalized when referring to specific mixtures such as Nitrox32, which contains 68% nitrogen and 32% oxygen. When one figure is stated, it refers to the oxygen percentage, not the nitrogen percentage. The original convention, Nitrox68/32 became shortened as the first figure is redundant.

The term "nitrox" was originally used to refer to the breathing gas in a seafloor habitat where the oxygen has to be kept to a lower fraction than in air to avoid long term oxygen toxicity problems. It was later used by Dr Morgan Wells of NOAA for mixtures with an oxygen fraction higher than air, and has become a generic term for binary mixtures of nitrogen and oxygen with any oxygen fraction, and in the context of recreational and technical diving, now usually refers to a mixture of nitrogen and oxygen with more than 21% oxygen. "Enriched Air Nitrox" or "EAN", and "Oxygen Enriched Air" are used to emphasize richer than air mixtures. In "EANx", the "x" was originally the x of nitrox, but has come to indicate the percentage of oxygen in the mix and is replaced by a number when the percentage is known; for example, a 40% oxygen mix is called EAN40. The two most popular blends are EAN32 and EAN36, developed by NOAA for scientific diving, and also named Nitrox I and Nitrox II, respectively, or Nitrox68/32 and Nitrox64/36. These two mixtures were first utilized to the depth and oxygen limits for scientific diving designated by NOAA at the time.

The term Oxygen Enriched Air (OEN) was accepted by the (American) scientific diving community, but although it is probably the most unambiguous and simply descriptive term yet proposed, it was resisted by the recreational diving community, sometimes in favour of less appropriate terminology.

In its early days of introduction to non-technical divers, nitrox has occasionally also been known by detractors by less complimentary terms, such as "devil gas" or "voodoo gas" (a term now sometimes used with pride).

American Nitrox Divers International (ANDI) uses the term "SafeAir", which they define as any oxygen-enriched air mixture with O_{2} concentrations between 22% and 50% that meet their gas quality and handling specifications, and specifically claim that these mixtures are safer than normally produced breathing air for the end user not envolved to the mix production which. Considering the complexities and hazards of mixing, handling, analyzing, and using oxygen-enriched air, this name is considered inappropriate by those who consider that it is not inherently "safe", but merely has decompression advantages.

=== MOD ===
Maximum Operating Depth (MOD) is the maximum safe depth at which a given nitrox mixture can be used. MOD depends on the allowed partial pressure of oxygen, which is related to exposure time and the acceptable risk assumed for central nervous system oxygen toxicity. Acceptable maximum ppO_{2} varies depending on the application:

- 1.2 is often used in closed circuit rebreathers.
- 1.4 is recommended by several recreational training agencies for ordinary scuba diving.
- 1.5 is allowed for commercial diving in some jurisdictions.
- 1.6 is allowed for technical diving decompression stops, and is the recommended maximum according to NOAA

Higher values are used by commercial and military divers in special circumstances, often when the diver uses surface supplied breathing apparatus, or for treatment in a chamber, where the airway is relatively secure.

== Choice of mixture ==
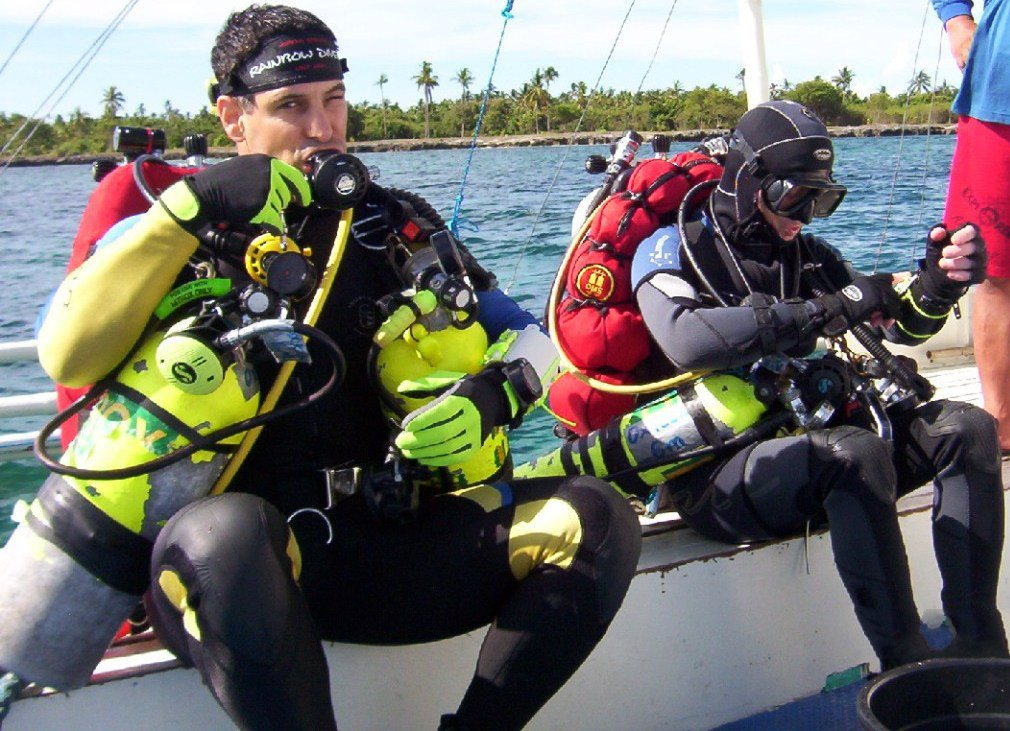
Technical divers preparing for a mixed-gas decompression dive in Bohol, Philippines. Note the backplate and wing setup with side mounted stage tanks containing EAN50 (left side) and pure oxygen (right side).

The two most common recreational diving nitrox mixes contain 32% and 36% oxygen, which have maximum operating depths (MODs) of 34 metres (112 ft) and 29 metres (95 ft) respectively when limited to a maximum partial pressure of oxygen of 1.4 bar (140 kPa). Divers may calculate an equivalent air depth to determine their decompression requirements or may use nitrox tables or a nitrox-capable dive computer.

Nitrox with more than 40% oxygen is uncommon within recreational diving. There are two main reasons for this: the first is that all pieces of diving equipment that come into contact with mixes containing higher proportions of oxygen, particularly at high pressure, need special cleaning and servicing to reduce the risk of fire. The second reason is that richer mixes extend the time the diver can stay underwater without needing decompression stops far further than the duration permitted by the capacity of typical diving cylinders. For example, based on the PADI nitrox recommendations, the maximum operating depth for EAN45 would be 21 metres (69 ft) and the maximum dive time available at this depth even with EAN36 is nearly 1 hour 15 minutes: a diver with a breathing rate of 20 litres per minute using twin 10-litre, 230-bar (about double 85 cu. ft.) cylinders would have completely emptied the cylinders after 1 hour 14 minutes at this depth.

Use of nitrox mixtures containing 50% to 80% oxygen is common in technical diving as decompression gas, which by virtue of its lower partial pressure of inert gases such as nitrogen and helium, allows for more efficient (faster) elimination of these gases from the tissues than leaner oxygen mixtures.

In deep open circuit technical diving, where hypoxic gases are breathed during the bottom portion of the dive, a Nitrox mix with 50% or less oxygen called a "travel mix" is sometimes breathed during the beginning of the descent in order to avoid hypoxia. Normally, however, the most oxygen-lean of the diver's decompression gases would be used for this purpose, since descent time spent reaching a depth where bottom mix is no longer hypoxic is normally small, and the distance between this depth and the MOD of any nitrox decompression gas is likely to be very short, if it occurs at all.

=== Best mix ===
The composition of a nitrox mix can be optimized for a given planned dive profile. This is termed "Best mix", for the dive, and provides the maximum no-decompression time compatible with acceptable oxygen exposure. An acceptable maximum partial pressure of oxygen is selected based on depth and planned bottom time, and this value is used to calculate the oxygen content of the best mix for the dive:

$$f_{\text{O}_2,\text{max}} = \frac{p_{\text{O}_2,\text{max}}}{p} = \frac{\text{Maximum acceptable partial pressure of oxygen}}{\text{Maximum ambient pressure of the dive}}$$

== Production ==
There are several methods of production:

- Mixing by partial pressure: a measured pressure of oxygen is decanted into the cylinder and cylinder is "topped up" with air from the diving air compressor. This method is very versatile and requires relatively little additional equipment if a suitable compressor is available, but it is labour-intensive, and high partial pressures of oxygen are relatively hazardous.
- Pre-mix decanting: the gas supplier provides large cylinders with popular mixes such as 32% and 36%. These may be further diluted with air to provide a larger range of mixtures.
- Mixing by continuous blending: measured quantities of oxygen are introduced to air and mixed with it before it reaches the compressor inlet. Concentration of oxygen is commonly monitored as partial pressure using an oxygen cell. The compressor and particularly the compressor oil, must be suitable for this service. If the resulting oxygen fraction is less than 40%, the cylinder and valve may not be required to be cleaned for oxygen service. Relatively efficient and quick compared to partial pressure blending, but requires a suitable compressor, and the range of mixes may be limited by the compressor specification.
- Mixing by mass fraction: oxygen and air or nitrogen are added to a cylinder that is accurately weighed until the required mix is achieved. This method requires fairly large and highly accurate scales, otherwise it is similar to partial pressure blending, but insensitive to temperature variations.
- Mixing by gas separation: a nitrogen permeable membrane is used to remove some of the nitrogen molecules from air until the required mix is achieved. The resulting low pressure nitrox is then pumped into cylinders by a compressor.
  A limited range of mixes is possible, but the equipment is quick and easy to operate and relatively safe, as there is never high partial pressure oxygen involved. A supply of clean low-pressure air at a constant temperature is required for consistent results. This may be supplied from a low pressure compressor or a regulated supply from high-pressure storage or compressor. The air must be free of contaminants that could clog the membrane, and at a constant inlet temperature and pressure to produce a consistent delivered partial pressure of oxygen. The air must be of breathing quality, other contaminants must be filtered out independently. The input air pressure is regulated and pressure over the membrane controlled to adjust the product oxygen fraction. CGA Grade D or E air quality is suitable for supply gas, and is commonly heated to a constant inlet temperature. Heating also reduces the chance of high humidity causing wetting of the membrane. In a typical system supply air enters the thousands of hollow fibres of the membrane at one end, and oxygen preferentially permeates the fibre walls, leaving mostly nitrogen at the discharge end, which is vented from the system as waste.
- Pressure swing adsorption requires relatively complex equipment, otherwise the advantages are similar to membrane separation. PSA is a technology used to separate gases from a mixture under pressure according to the molecular characteristics and affinity for an adsorbent material of the gases at near-ambient temperatures. Specific adsorbent materials are used as a trap, preferentially adsorbing the target gases at high pressure. The process then swings to low pressure to desorb the adsorbed material and flush the adsorbent container so that it can be reused.

== Cylinder markings to identify contents ==
One type of nitrox cylinder identification label

Any diving cylinder containing a blend of gasses other than standard air is required by most diver training organizations, and some national governments, to be clearly marked to indicate the current gas mixture. In practice it is common to use a printed adhesive label to indicate the type of gas (in this case nitrox), and to add a temporary label to specify the analysis of the current mix.

== Regional standards and conventions ==
=== European Union ===
Within the EU, valves with M26x2 outlet thread are recommended for cylinders with increased oxygen content. Regulators for use with these cylinders require compatible connectors, and are not directly connectable with cylinders for compressed air.

=== Germany ===
A nitrox cylinder is specially cleaned and identified. According to EN 144-3 the cylinder colour is overall white with the letter N on opposite sides of the cylinder. The fraction of oxygen in the bottle is checked after filling and marked on the cylinder.

=== South Africa ===
South African National Standard 10019:2008 specifies the colour of all scuba cylinders as Golden yellow with French gray shoulder. This applies to all underwater breathing gases except medical oxygen, which must be carried in cylinders that are Black with a White shoulder. Nitrox cylinders must be identified by a transparent, self-adhesive label with green lettering, fitted below the shoulder. In effect this is green lettering on a yellow cylinder, with a gray shoulder. The composition of the gas must also be specified on the label. In practice this is done by a small additional self-adhesive label marked with the measured oxygen fraction, which is changed when a new mix is filled.

The 2021 revision of SANS 10019 changed the colour specification to Light navy grey for the shoulder, and a different label specification which includes hazard symbols for high-pressure and oxidising materials.

=== United States ===
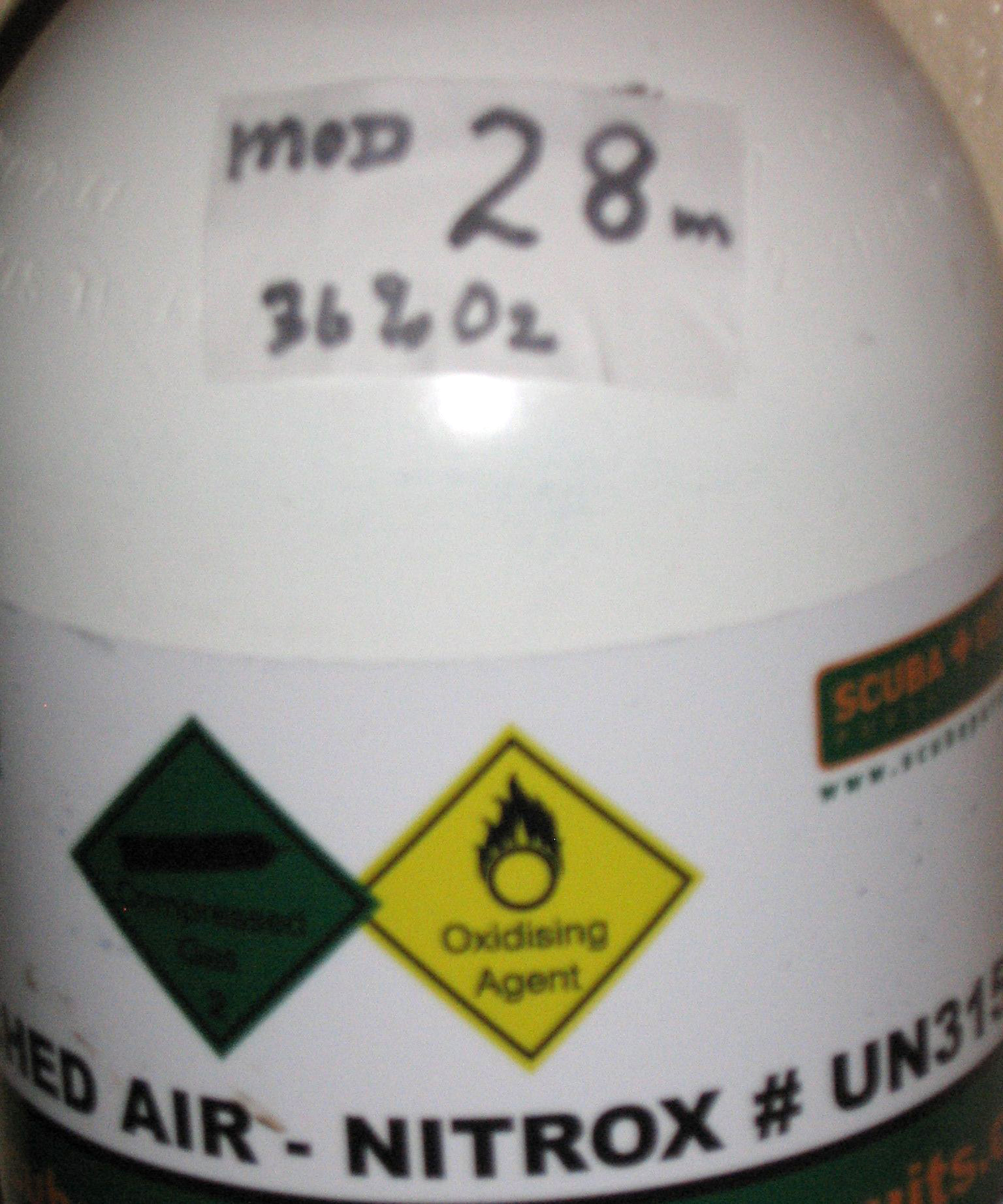
Cylinder showing Nitrox band and sticker marked with maximum operating depth (MOD) and oxygen fraction (%O_{2})

Every nitrox cylinder should also have a sticker stating whether or not the cylinder is oxygen clean and suitable for partial pressure blending. Any oxygen-clean cylinder may have any mix up to 100% oxygen inside. If by some accident an oxygen-clean cylinder is filled at a station that does not supply gas to oxygen-clean standards it is then considered contaminated and must be re-cleaned before a gas containing more than 40% oxygen may again be added. Cylinders marked as 'not oxygen clean' may only be filled with oxygen-enriched air mixtures from membrane or stick blending systems where the gas is mixed before being added to the cylinder, and to an oxygen fraction not exceeding 40% by volume.

== Hazards ==
Nitrox can be a hazard to the blender and to the user, for different reasons.

=== Fire and toxic cylinder contamination from oxygen reactions ===
Partial pressure blending using pure oxygen decanted into the cylinder before topping up with air may involve very high oxygen fractions and oxygen partial pressures during the decanting process, which constitute a relatively high fire hazard. This procedure requires care and precautions by the operator, and decanting equipment and cylinders which are clean for oxygen service, but the equipment is relatively simple and inexpensive. Partial pressure blending using pure oxygen is often used to provide nitrox on live-aboard dive boats, but it is also used in some dive shops and clubs.

Any gas which contains a significantly larger percentage of oxygen than air is a fire hazard, and such gases can react with hydrocarbons or lubricants and sealing materials inside the filling system to produce toxic gases, even if a fire is not apparent. Some organisations exempt equipment from oxygen-clean standards if the oxygen fraction is limited to 40% or less.

Among recreational training agencies, only ANDI subscribes to the guideline of requiring oxygen cleaning for equipment used with more than 23% oxygen fraction. The USCG, NOAA, U.S. Navy, OSHA, and the other recreational training agencies accept the limit as 40% as no accident or incident has been known to occur when this guideline has been properly applied. Tens of thousands of recreational divers are trained each year and the overwhelming majority of these divers are taught the "over 40% rule". Most nitrox fill stations which supply pre-mixed nitrox will fill cylinders with mixtures below 40% without certification of cleanliness for oxygen service. Luxfer cylinders specify oxygen cleaning for all mixtures exceeding 23.5% oxygen.

The following references for oxygen cleaning specifically cite the "over 40%" guideline that has been in widespread use since the 1960s, and consensus at the 1992 Enriched Air Workshop was to accept that guideline and continue the status quo.

- Code of Federal Regulations, Part 1910.430 (i) – Commercial Diving Operations
- OSHA Oxygen Specifications 1910.420 (1)
- NOAA Oxygen Specifications (appendix D)
- U.S. Navy Oxygen Specifications U.S. MIL-STD-777E (SH) Note K-6-4, Cat. K.6
- U.S. Coast Guard Oxygen Specifications Title 46: Shipping, revisions through 10-1-92. 197.452 Oxygen Cleaning 46 CFR 197.451

Much of the confusion appears to be a result of misapplying PVHO (pressure vessel for human occupancy) guidelines which prescribe a maximum ambient oxygen content of 25% when a human is sealed into a pressure vessel (chamber). The concern here is for a fire hazard to a living person who could be trapped in an oxygen-rich burning environment.

Of the three commonly applied methods of producing enriched air mixes – continuous blending, partial pressure blending, and membrane separation systems – only partial pressure blending would require the valve and cylinder components to be oxygen cleaned for mixtures with less than 40% oxygen. The other two methods ensure that the equipment is never subjected to greater than 40% oxygen content.

In a fire, the pressure in a gas cylinder rises in direct proportion to its absolute temperature. If the internal pressure exceeds the mechanical limitations of the cylinder and there are no means to safely vent the pressurized gas to the atmosphere, the vessel will fail mechanically. If the vessel contents are ignitable or a contaminant is present this event may result in a "fireball".

=== Incorrect gas mix ===
Use of a gas mix that differs from the planned mix introduces an increased risk of decompression sickness or an increased risk of oxygen toxicity, depending on the error. It may be possible to simply recalculate the dive plan or set the dive computer accordingly, but in some cases the planned dive may not be practicable.

Many training agencies such as PADI, CMAS, SSI and NAUI train their divers to personally check the oxygen percentage content of each nitrox cylinder before every dive. If the oxygen percentage deviates by more than 1% from the planned mix, the diver must either recalculate the dive plan with the actual mix, or else abort the dive to avoid increased risk of oxygen toxicity or decompression sickness. Under IANTD and ANDI rules for use of nitrox, which are followed by dive resorts around the world, filled nitrox cylinders are signed out personally in a blended gas records book, which contains, for each cylinder and fill, the cylinder number, the measured oxygen fraction by percentage, the calculated maximum operating depth for that mix, and the signature of the receiving diver, who should have personally measured the oxygen fraction before taking delivery. All of these steps reduce risk but increase complexity of operations as each diver must use the specific cylinder they have checked out. In South Africa, the national standard for handling and filling portable cylinders with pressurised gases (SANS 10019) requires that the cylinder be labelled with a sticker identifying the contents as nitrox, and specifying the oxygen fraction. Similar requirements may apply in other countries.

== History ==
In 1874, Henry Fleuss made what was possibly the first Nitrox dive using a rebreather.

In 1911, Draeger of Germany tested an injector operated rebreather backpack for a standard diving suit. This concept was produced and marketed as the DM20 oxygen rebreather system and the DM40 nitrox rebreather system, in which air from one cylinder and oxygen from a second cylinder were mixed during injection through a nozzle which circulated the breathing gas through the scrubber and the rest of the loop. The DM40 was rated for depths up to 40m.

Christian J. Lambertsen proposed calculations for nitrogen addition to prevent oxygen toxicity in divers utilizing nitrogen–oxygen rebreather diving.

In World War II or soon after, British commando frogmen and clearance divers started occasionally diving with oxygen rebreathers adapted for semi-closed-circuit nitrox (which they called "mixture") diving by fitting larger cylinders and carefully setting the gas flow rate using a flow meter. These developments were kept secret until independently duplicated by civilians in the 1960s.

Lambertson published a paper on nitrox in 1947.

In the 1950s, the United States Navy (USN) documented enriched oxygen gas procedures for military use of what we today call nitrox, in the US Navy Diving Manual.

In 1955, E. Lanphier described the use of nitrogen–oxygen diving mixtures, and the equivalent air depth method for calculating decompression from air tables.

In the 1960s, A. Galerne used on-line blending for commercial diving.

In 1970, Morgan Wells, who was the first director of the National Oceanographic and Atmospheric Administration (NOAA) Diving Center, began instituting diving procedures for oxygen-enriched air. He introduced the concept of Equivalent Air Depth (EAD). He also developed a process for mixing oxygen and air which he called a continuous blending system. For many years Wells' invention was the only practical alternative to partial pressure blending. In 1979 NOAA published Wells' procedures for the scientific use of nitrox in the NOAA Diving Manual.

In 1985 Dick Rutkowski, a former NOAA diving safety officer, formed IAND (International Association of Nitrox Divers) and began teaching nitrox use for recreational diving. This was considered dangerous by some, and met with heavy skepticism by the diving community.

In 1989, the Harbor Branch Oceanographic institution workshop addressed blending, oxygen limits and decompression issues.

In 1991, Bove, Bennett and Skin Diver magazine took a stand against nitrox use for recreational diving. Skin Diver editor Bill Gleason dubbed nitrox the "Voodoo Gas". The annual DEMA show (held in Houston, Texas that year) banned nitrox training providers from the show. This caused a backlash, and when DEMA relented, a number of organizations took the opportunity to present nitrox workshops outside the show.

In 1992, the Scuba Diving Resources Group organised a workshop where some guidelines were established, and some misconceptions addressed.

In 1992, BSAC banned its members from using nitrox during BSAC activities. IAND's name was changed to the International Association of Nitrox and Technical Divers (IANTD), the T being added when the European Association of Technical Divers (EATD) merged with IAND. In the early 1990s, these agencies were teaching nitrox, but the main scuba agencies were not. Additional new organizations, including the American Nitrox Divers International (ANDI) – which invented the term "Safe Air" for marketing purposes – and Technical Diving International (TDI) were begun. NAUI became the first existing major recreational diver training agency to sanction nitrox.

In 1993, the Sub-Aqua Association was the first UK recreational diving training agency to acknowledge and endorse the Nitrox training their members had undertaken with one of the tech agencies. The SAA's first recreational Nitrox qualification was issued in April 1993. The SAA's first Nitrox instructor was Vic Bonfante and he was certified in September 1993.

Meanwhile, diving stores were finding a purely economic reason to offer nitrox: not only was an entire new course and certification needed to use it, but instead of cheap or free tank fills with compressed air, dive shops found they could charge premium amounts of money for custom-gas blending of nitrox to their ordinary, moderately experienced divers. With the new dive computers which could be programmed to allow for the longer bottom-times and shorter residual nitrogen times that nitrox gave, the incentive for the sport diver to use the gas increased.

In 1993, Skin Diver magazine, the leading recreational diving publication at the time, published a three-part series arguing that nitrox was unsafe for sport divers. (Note: A position which it would formally maintain until in 1995 magazine editor Bill Gleason was reported to say that nitrox was "all right". Skin Diver would later go into bankruptcy.) DiveRite manufactured the first nitrox-compatible dive computer, called the Bridge, the aquaCorps TEK93 conference was held in San Francisco, and a practicable oil limit of 0.1 mg/m^{3} for oxygen compatible air was set. The Canadian armed forces issued EAD tables with an upper PO_{2} of 1.5 ATA.

In 1994, John Lamb and Vandagraph launched the first oxygen analyzer built specifically for Nitrox and mixed-gas divers, at the Birmingham Dive Show.

In 1994, BSAC reversed its policy on Nitrox and announced BSAC nitrox training to start in 1995.

In 1996, the Professional Association of Diving Instructors (PADI) announced full educational support for nitrox. While other mainline scuba organizations had announced their support of nitrox earlier, it was PADI's endorsement that established nitrox as a standard recreational diving option.

In 1997, ProTec started with Nitrox 1 (recreational) and Nitrox 2 (technical). A German ProTec Nitrox manual (ref to the 6th edition) has been published.

In 1999, a survey by R.W. Hamilton showed that over hundreds of thousands of nitrox dives, the DCS record is good. Nitrox had become popular with recreational divers, but not used much by commercial divers who tend to use surface supplied breathing apparatus. The OSHA accepted a petition for a variance from the commercial diving regulations for recreational scuba instructors.

The 2001 edition of the NOAA Diving Manual included a chapter intended for Nitrox training.

== In nature ==
At times in the geological past, the Earth's atmosphere contained much more than 20% oxygen: e.g. up to 35% in the Upper Carboniferous period. This let animals absorb oxygen more easily and influenced their evolutionary patterns.

== See also ==
- Other breathing gases – Gas used for human respiration
  - Argox – Gas mixture occasionally used by scuba divers for dry-suit inflation
  - Heliox – Breathing gas mixed from helium and oxygen
  - Hydreliox – Breathing gas mixture of hydrogen, helium, and oxygen
  - Hydrox – Breathing gas mixture experimentally used for very deep diving
  - Trimix – Breathing gas consisting of oxygen, helium and nitrogen
- Breathing gas analysis – Detection and measurement of components of a breathing gas
- Diving cylinder – Container to supply high pressure gas for diving operations
- Methods of Gas blending – Producing special gas mixtures to specification
  - Membrane gas separation – Technology for splitting specific gases out of mixtures
- Equivalent air depth – Method of comparing decompression requirements for air and a given nitrox mix
- Lean air – Gas mixture with less than 21% oxygen in nitrigen
- Maximum operating depth – Safety concept in underwater diving
- Nitrogen narcosis – Narcotic effects of respiratory nitrogen
- Oxygen toxicity – Toxic effects of breathing oxygen at high partial pressures
- Partial pressure – Pressure of a component gas in a mixture
