= NOGI Awards =

Annual awards by Academy of Underwater Arts and Sciences

The NOGI Awards
- Awarded for: Recognition as belonging to "a select cadre of divers and undersea luminaries who rank at the top of their fields in one of five categories: Arts, Science, Sports/Education, Distinguished Service, and Environment."
- Country: United States
- Presented by: Academy of Underwater Arts and Sciences (since 1993); Underwater Society of America (1960-1992)
- First award: 1960; 2012 (Environment)

The NOGI Awards is an award presented annually by the Academy of Underwater Arts and Sciences (AUAS) to diving luminaries and is "considered the Oscar of the ocean world." Selection of recipients is based on their record of accomplishments and excellence in the diving world. NOGI awards are given out to world-class standouts of the diving community who have distinguished themselves and made a global impact on diving in one or more of four general categories: Science, Arts, Sports/Education, and Environment. A fifth NOGI is given for Distinguished Service.

== History ==
The NOGI awards originally came into existence as part of the trophy system offered during the 1950s for the underwater division of the New Orleans Grand Isle Fishing Tournament. NOGI is the acronym for the first four words of the tournament's name. In its current form, the NOGI awards date back to 1960 when Jay Albeanese and Louis Cuccia of New Orleans approached the Underwater Society of America for its sanction of an "award to annually recognize leaders in the field of skin and SCUBA diving in four categories." Since 1993, the NOGI awards scheme has been the responsibility of the Academy of Underwater Arts and Sciences. In 2013, a fifth category "Environment" was added to the awards scheme.

== Academy of Underwater Arts and Sciences ==
The Academy of Underwater Arts and Sciences (AUAS) was formed in 1993 for the purpose of administering the NOGI Awards. It has status as a 501(c)3 non-profit organization. Its mission is to be:

a 501(c)3 non-profit, international, multi-disciplinary organization dedicated to recognizing pioneers and leaders who have had a significant impact on the exploration, enjoyment, safety, and preservation of the underwater world. The AUAS is committed to supporting its members as they pass on the stewardship of the sea to future generations.

== NOGI categories ==
There are five categories of NOGIs.

Science: Recipients in the Science category include renowned underwater archaeologists such as E. Lee Spence and George Bass, inventors like Edwin Link, undersea explorers like Sylvia Earle and Robert Ballard, doctors involved in hyperbaric medicine such as Joseph MacInnis, as well as marine biologists, and other marine scientists.

Arts: Awardees in the Arts category have included internationally known filmmakers such as James Cameron and Stan Waterman, marine artists like Guy Harvey, and photographers such as National Geographic's Emory Kristof.

Sports/education: The Sports & Education category recognizes distinguished diver athletes like Ron Taylor and Bret Gilliam (diver), educators like John Christopher Fine and even actors like Lloyd Bridges and Zale Parry who were pioneer scuba divers and portrayed divers on TV's Sea Hunt, and thus helped to encourage and grow the public's interest in diving.

Environment: The newest category of NOGI which was added in 2013 is for Environment and its first recipient is Dr. G. Carleton Ray. It is meant to recognize divers who, well beyond their normal employment, have led efforts to protect the world's underwater heritage.

Distinguished service: Distinguished Service recipients have typically included world-renowned divers like Captain Jacques-Yves Cousteau and Astronaut/Aquanaut Scott Carpenter but they have also included lesser known people whose professional, volunteer and/or private work has truly had a major impact on the diving industry and/or the global diving community in general.

== The statuette ==
The original NOGI statuettes were designed by New Orleans sculptor Vero Puccio, who hand carved them out of mahogany (one report says balsa) and later cast them out of polywood. Since 2005, when the statuette, which shows a pedestal mounted skin diver standing with upraised arms holding a plaque reading "NOGI," was updated by marine wildlife artist Wyland (who is also a NOGI winner), the statuettes have been made of cast lucite.

== NOGI Award recipients ==
The following is a listing of all NOGI recipients since its creation in 1960.

Award Year	Science	Arts	Sports/Education	Distinguished Service	Environment
1960	Eugene J.D. Vezzani, Ph.D.	Jim Auxier / Chuck Blakeslee	George Youmans	Carl H. Hauber	x
1961	Jim Christiansen / Jack Faver	x	x	C.B. "Ben" Davis	x
1962	David M. Owen	James Dugan	Gustav Dalla Valle	John J. McAniff	x
1963	Edward Lanphier, M.D.	Luis Marden	Mary Edith "Mel" Lillis	Joseph D. Albanese, Jr.	x
1964	Capt. George Bond	Coles Phinizy	William "Bill" High	Albert Tillman	x
1965	Edwin Link	Eugenie Clark, M.D.	John Ernst	Pablo Bush Romero	x
1966	Robert Workman, M.D.	Dimitri Rebikoff	Ron Taylor	Capt. Jacques-Yves Cousteau	x
1967	Hon. Jacques Piccard, Ph.D.	Bill Barada	Ralph Davis	Louis R. Cuccia	x
1968	Andreas B. Rechnitzer, Ph.D.	Stanton A. Waterman	Terry Lintz	David R. Stith	x
1969	Albert Behnke, M.D.	Paul Tzimoulis	James R. Stewart	Glen H. Egstrom, Ph.D.	x
1970	Harold Edgerton, Ph.D.	Richard Anderson	T.F. "Duke" Pawlowicz	Oscar Asturias	x
1971	Christian J. Lambertsen, M.D.	Peter Gimbel	Harold Drake	Walter Feinberg	x
1972	Joseph MacInnis, M.D.	Al Giddings	Harold Drake	Frank Scalli	x
1973	Arthur J. Bachrach, Ph.D.	Ron Church	Bernard "Bernie" Empleton	Zale Parry	x
1974	George Bass, Ph.D.	Lamar Boren	Wheeler North, Ph.D.	Nick Icorn	x
1975	Robert D. Ballard, Ph.D.	Ernest H. Brooks, II	Ellis E.R. Cross / Charles Nicklin	Melvin Grosvenor, Ph.D.	x
1976	Sylvia A. Earle, Ph.D.	Bates Littlehales	Arthur H. Ulrich	Robert F. Marx	x
1977	Robert Dill, Ph.D.	Phillippe Pierre Cousteau	Dewey Bergman	Jack McKenny	x
1978	Conrad Limbaugh	David N. Doubilet	Mel Fisher	George Benjamin, Ph.D.	x
1979	Roger W. Cook	Lee Tepley, Ph.D.	Jim Brown	Charles Wesley Shilling, M.D.	x
1980	Peter B. Bennett, Ph.D.	Valerie Taylor	Louis M. Fead	Harry Shanks	x
1981	Glen H. Egstrom, Ph.D.	Rick Freshee	Jefferson Davis, M.D. / John Geiszler	Nixon Griffis	x
1982	Richard A Cooper, Ph.D.	Genaro Hurtado	Lloyd Bridges	Dick Bonin	x
1983	Capt. Otto Van Der Aue, M.D.	Mendel L. Peterson	Helen Turcotte Davis	Elliott Finkle, Ph.D.	x
1984	Gene Shinn	Nancy Sefton	J. Morgan Wells, Ph.D.	Ralph Osterhout	x
1985	George Ruggieri	Cathy Church/Jim Church	Walt Hendrick, Sr.	John Cronin	x
1986	James W. Miller, Ph.D.	Charles Nicklin	x	John H. Perry, Jr.	x
1987	Eugenie Clark, Ph.D.	Emory Kristof	Bert Kilbride	Richard M. Sammon	x
1988	Richard A. Slater, Ph.D.	Jack McKenny	Jon Hardy	Andre Galerne	x
1989	Don Walsh, Ph.D.	Ivan Tors	Jon Gaffney	Andreas B. Rechnitzer, Ph.D.	x
1990	Robert I. Wicklund	Bev Morgan	Dennis K. Graver	Ian G. Koblick	x
1991	William "Bill" High	Jordan Klein, Sr.	Richard W. Long	E.B. "Teddy" Tucker, M.B.E.	x
1992	Christopher Nicholson	Ralph White	Frank Fennell	Ellis E.R. Cross	x
1993	Jean-Michel Cousteau	Howard W. Hall	John Christopher Fine	Gov. Lowell P. Weicker, Ph.D.	x
1994	Alfred Bove, M.D., Ph.D.	Flip Nicklin	Lee H. Somers, Ph.D.	Mary Edith "Mel" Lillis	x
1995	R.W. Bill Hamilton, Ph.D.	Bob Talbet	Bev Morgan	Scott Carpenter	x
1996	Kathryn D. Sullivan, Ph.D.	Ricou Browning	Dan Orr	Surgeon Vice Admiral John Rawlins	x
1997	Phil Nuytten, Ph.D.	Lt. Col. John D. Craig	Robert Clark	Capt. Phillippe Tailliez	x
1998	Hans Hass, Ph.D.	Wyland	Richard Murphy, Ph.D.	Hans Hass, Ph.D.	x
1999	Richard W. Grigg, Ph.D.	James Cameron	Andreas B. Rechnitzer, Ph.D.	Albert Falco	x
2000	John E. Randall, Ph.D.	Ada Rebikoff	Tom Mount	Frederic Dumas	x
2001	Bob Hollis	Geri Murphy	John Cronin	Hillary Viders, Ph.D.	x
2002	Anatoly M. Sagalevitch, Ph.D.	John Stoneman	Edward C. Cargile	Émile Gagnan	x
2003	Jim Cahill	Chris Newbert / Birgitte Wilms	Leslie Leaney	x	
2004	Richard Pyle, Ph.D.	Guy C. Harvey, Ph.D.	Armand Zigahn	Henri G. Delauze	x
2005	Paul Dayton, Ph.D.	Peter Benchley	Bob Evans	Lee Selisky	x
2006	Paul S. Auerbach, M.D.	Bill Curtsinger	Bill Meistrell / Bob Meistrell	William "Bill" High	x
2007	Charles Birkeland, Ph.D.	Wes Skiles	Carl Roessler	Dee Scarr	x
2008	Hannes Keller	Bonnie Cardone	Walt "Butch" Hendrick	Mike Gower	x
2009	Michael Lang	Michele Hall	Paul Humann	Hillary Hauser	x
2010	Patrick Colin, Ph.D.	Bernie Campoli	William Hamner / Peggy Hamner	Frank K. Butler Jr., M.D.	x
2011	Phillip Lobel, Ph.D.	Nick Caloyianis	Ed Stetson	Mike deGruy	x
2012–2013	E. Lee Spence, M.H.D.	Michael Aw	Bret Gilliam	Dave Parker	G. Carleton Ray, Ph.D.
2014	Richard D. Vann, Ph.D.	Richard Ellis	Mike Hollis	Lad Handelman	Bill Macdonald
2015	Dr Richard A. Lutz	Clive Cussler	Bob Kirby	Rodney Fox	Dr Gregory S. Stone
2016	Mike Cochran	Stephen Frink	Bob Croft	Bonnie Toth	Hardy Jones
2017	Dr Gerald R Allen	Chuck Davis	Jill Heinerth	Tom Ingram	Dr. Eric Sala
2018	Dr. Michael L. Gernhardt	Marty Snyderman	Sally E. Bauer, M.D.	Peter A Hughes	John C. Ogden, Ph.D.
2019	Dr Tom Neuman	Brian Skerry	Eric Hanauer	Jerry Greenberg	Dr Wallace Nichols
2020	Laurence Madin	Paul Nicklen	Don Barthelmess	Carol Rose	Wolcot Henry
2022	John R. Clarke	Adam Ravetch	Jack and Sue Drafahl	Dr. Albert Jones	Harry Robbin
2023	James R. Holm M.D	Amos Nachoum	Dr. Drew Richardson	Abdulmoshen Abdulmalik Al	Lynn Funkhouser
2024	Shirley A. Pomponi, PhD.	Louis Prézelin	Jeffery Bozanic, Ph.D.	Jim Gatacre	Lad Atkins
2025	Richard Moon, Dr.	Becky Kagan Schott	LeRoy French	Dick Rutkowski	Georgienne Bradley
Award Year	Science	Arts	Sports/Education	Distinguished Service	Environment
