= International Scuba Diving Hall of Fame =

Annual event recognizing recreational scuba industry contributors

- Frequency: Annual
- Location: Cayman Islands
- Inaugurated: 2000
- Website: http://www.scubahalloffame.com/

The International Scuba Diving Hall of Fame (ISDHF) is an annual event that recognizes those who have contributed to the success and growth of recreational scuba diving in dive travel, entertainment, art, equipment design and development, education, exploration and adventure. It was founded in 2000 by the Cayman Islands Ministry of Tourism. Currently, it exists virtually with plans for a physical facility to be built at a future time.

== Hall of Fame inductees ==
This is a list of the inductees who are honored in the International Scuba Diving Hall of Fame.

=== Early pioneers ===
- John Ernest Williamson – Pioneer underwater photographer
- George Williamson
- Louis Boutan – French biologist, photographer and zoologist
- Henry Fleuss – British inventor of diving equipment (1851 – 1933)
- Yves Le Prieur – French naval officer and inventor of a free-flow scuba system
- Benoît Rouquayrol – French inventor of an early diving demand regulator
- Auguste Denayrouze – French inventor of a demand air supply regulator for underwater diving
- Hugh Bradner – American physicist, neoprene wetsuit inventor (1915–2008)
- Louis de Corlieu – French naval officer and inventor of the swimfin
- John Scott Haldane – British physiologist and researcher (1860–1936)
- Maurice Fenzy – French manufacturer of industrial and diving breathing equipment
- Ted Eldred – Australian inventor of the single hose diving regulator
- Max "Gene" Nohl

=== 2000 ===
- Lloyd Bridges – American actor (1913–1998)
- Jacques Cousteau – French oceanographer and author (1910–1997)
- Ben Cropp – Australian documentary filmmaker, conservationist and spearfisherman
- E. R. Cross
- Gustav Dalla Valle
- Jefferson Davis
- Sylvia Earle – American marine biologist and oceanographer
- Bernard Eaton
- Emile Gagnon
- Al Giddings
- Hans Hass – Austrian biologist, film-maker and underwater diving pioneer (1919–2013)
- Lotte Hass – Austrian pioneering diver and underwater photographer
- Jack Lavanchy
- Jack Mckenny
- Bob Soto
- Ron Taylor – Australian diver and shark cinematographer
- Valerie Taylor – Australian underwater photographer
- Albert Tillman – American educator and underwater diver
- Stan Waterman – American cinematographer and underwater film producer (1923–2023)

=== 2002 ===
- John Cronin
- David Doubilet – Underwater photographer and author
- Bob Hollis
- Zale Parry – American scuba diver, photographer and actress (1933–2026)
- Ivan Tors – Hungarian playwright, film director, screenwriter, and film and television producer
- Paul Tzimoulis

=== 2003 ===
- Chuck Blakeslee
- Jim Auxier
- Jean-Michel Cousteau – French oceanographic explorer
- Frédéric Dumas – French pioneer of scuba diving (1913–1991)
- Jordan Klein
- Frank Scalli

=== 2004 ===
- Dick Anderson
- Mike Ball
- Jerry Greenberg
- Kendall McDonald
- Spencer Slate
- Akira Tateishi

=== 2005 ===
- Dewey Bergman
- Ernest Brooks
- Andreas Rechnitzer – American oceanographer and scuba diving pioneer
- Don Stewart – American inventor, Bonairean activist, scuba diver and founder of Bonaire Marine Park

=== 2007 ===
- Cornell Burke (Honouree)
- Neville Coleman – Australian naturalist, underwater photographer, writer, publisher and educator
- Neville Darvin Ebanks (Honouree)
- Ralph Erickson
- Rodney Fox – Australian diver, film maker and conservationist
- Paul Humann
- Carl Roessler

=== 2008 ===
- Cathy Church – American marine biologist, diver, photographer and educator
- James Dailey (Honouree)
- Bob Halstead – British scuba diver (1944–2018)
- Kem Jackson (Honouree)
- Daniel Mercier – French footballer (1892–1914)
- Drew Richardson
- Ron Steven

=== 2009 ===
- Kimiuo Aisek
- Geri Murphy
- Howard Rosenstein
- Larry Smith

=== 2010 ===
- Eugenie Clark – American ichthyologist, shark researcher and scientific scuba diver
- Nick Icorn
- Francis Toribiong
- Wyland – American muralist (born 1956)

=== 2011 ===
- Howard and Michele Hall
- Andre Labn
- Clement Lee
- Bev Morgan
- Allan Power

=== 2012 ===
- Clive Cussler – American novelist and underwater explorer (1931–2020)
- Ric and Do Cammick
- Ron Kipp
- Armand and JoAnn Zigahn
- Kelly Tarlton – New Zealand marine archaeologist
- Leslie Leaney

=== 2013 ===
- Sam Davison
- Guy Harvey – Jamaican marine wildlife artist and conservationist
- Bert Kilbride
- Rolf Schmidt – German sailor
- Petra Roeglin

=== 2015 ===
- Nancy Easterbrook (Honouree)
- Bill High
- Peter Hughes
- Gladys B. Howard (Honouree)
- Dr Albert Jones
- Wally Muller
- Dr. James Poulson (Honouree)
- Dimitri Rebikoff

=== 2016 ===
- Robert A. Barth, also known as Bob Barth – American quartermaster and aquanaut (1930–2020)
- Ramón Bravo – Mexican diver photographer and underwater filmmaker
- Philippe Cousteau, Senior – French diver and cinematographer (1940–1979)
- Stuart Cove
- Kyuhachi Kataoka (Early pioneer)
- Dr. Joe MacInnis – Canadian physician, author, poet and aquanaut
- Kanezo Ohgushi (Early pioneer)
- Riichi Watanabe (Early pioneer)

=== 2017 ===
- Dick Bonin
- Krov Menuhin
- Kurt Schafer
- Gardner Young
- Professional Association of Diving Instructors – Recreational diver training and certification agency (Significant Career Achievement and/or Industry Contribution)

=== 2018 ===
- H. S. Batuna
- Stephen Frink – Underwater photographer and publisher
- Wulf H. Koehler
- Boris Porotov
- Dick Rutkowski – American pioneer in hyperbaric and diving medicine
- Philippe Tailliez – French pioneer of scuba diving and underwater photographer (Honoured posthumously 2018 Early Pioneer Award)

=== 2019 ===
- Jonathan Bird – American underwater cinematographer and television host
- Hussain "Sendi" Rasheed
- Lee Selisky
- Adel Mohamed Taher

=== 2020 ===
- Jill Heinerth – Canadian cave diver (born 1965)
- Tom Ingram
- Avi Klapfer
- Jim Gatacre
