= James Cahill =

James Cahill may refer to:

- James Cahill (art historian) (1926–2014), American art historian, authority on Chinese art
- James F. Cahill (1926–2008), scuba diving pioneer
- James Cahill (snooker player) (born 1995), English snooker player
- James Cahill (author), British art critic, academic, and author
- Jim Cahill (James Edward Cahill, 1903–1978), Australian politician
