= Sandfall =

Geological process

Sandfall (sand fall or grainfall) is a term applied to a variety of forms of sedimentary transport or sedimentary features belonging to the larger category of mass wasting, and are driven by wind, water currents and gravitational forces.

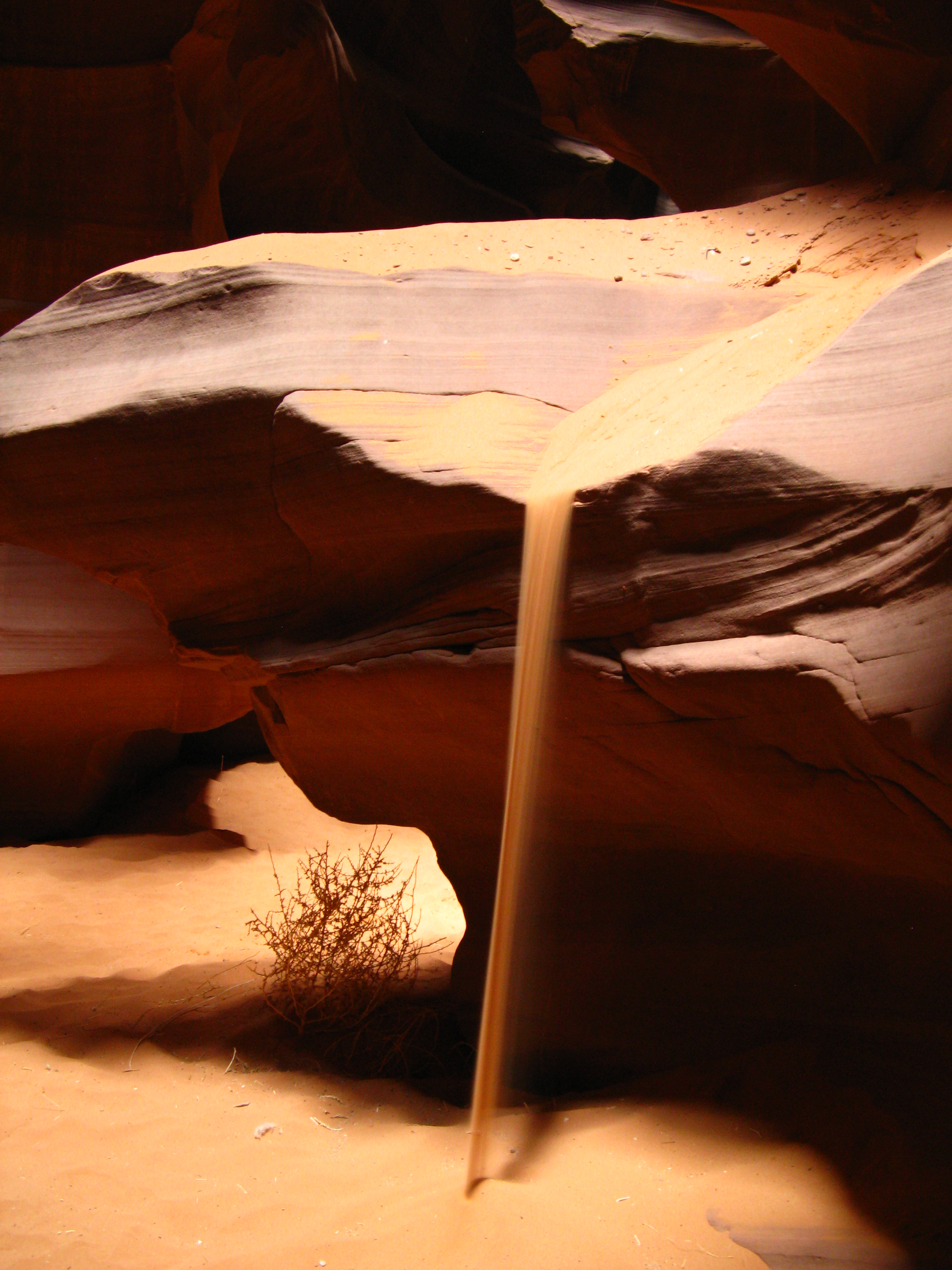
Sandfall in Antelope Canyon

One, sometimes spectacular, form is superficially similar to waterfalls and may be found under dry, desert conditions or in submarine conditions. The sand either falls vertically over suitable drops or cascades down hard slopes. The process has been described as "dry sandflows cascading down the escarpment face, where the grain concentration decreases dramatically and the streaming component of stress greatly exceeds the collisional component"

Sandfalls are found in sandstone canyons such as Antelope Canyon. A similar process occurs in submarine environments driven by water currents and gravity. Sandfalls on a large scale occur off the southern tip of the island of Mauritius, where strong ocean currents move sand from the high coastal shelf over the edge and into the abyssal depths. Sandfalls in the submarine San Lucas Canyon off Cabo San Lucas, Baja California were dived by Jacques Cousteau. Carter (1975) argues that the ubiquity of this process is evident from the examples from the sides of submarine canyons documented by Dill (1964) and from seamounts and deep-sea trenches documented by Heezen and Holhster (1971).

Also sometimes referred to as sandfall, is the movement of sand on the "steeply sloping surface on the lee side of a dune standing at or near the angle of repose of loose sand and advancing downwind by a succession of slides wherever that angle is exceeded."

The process of sand falling like rain has also been referred to as a sandfall.
