= Tom Mount =

Pioneering technical and cave diver (1939–2022)

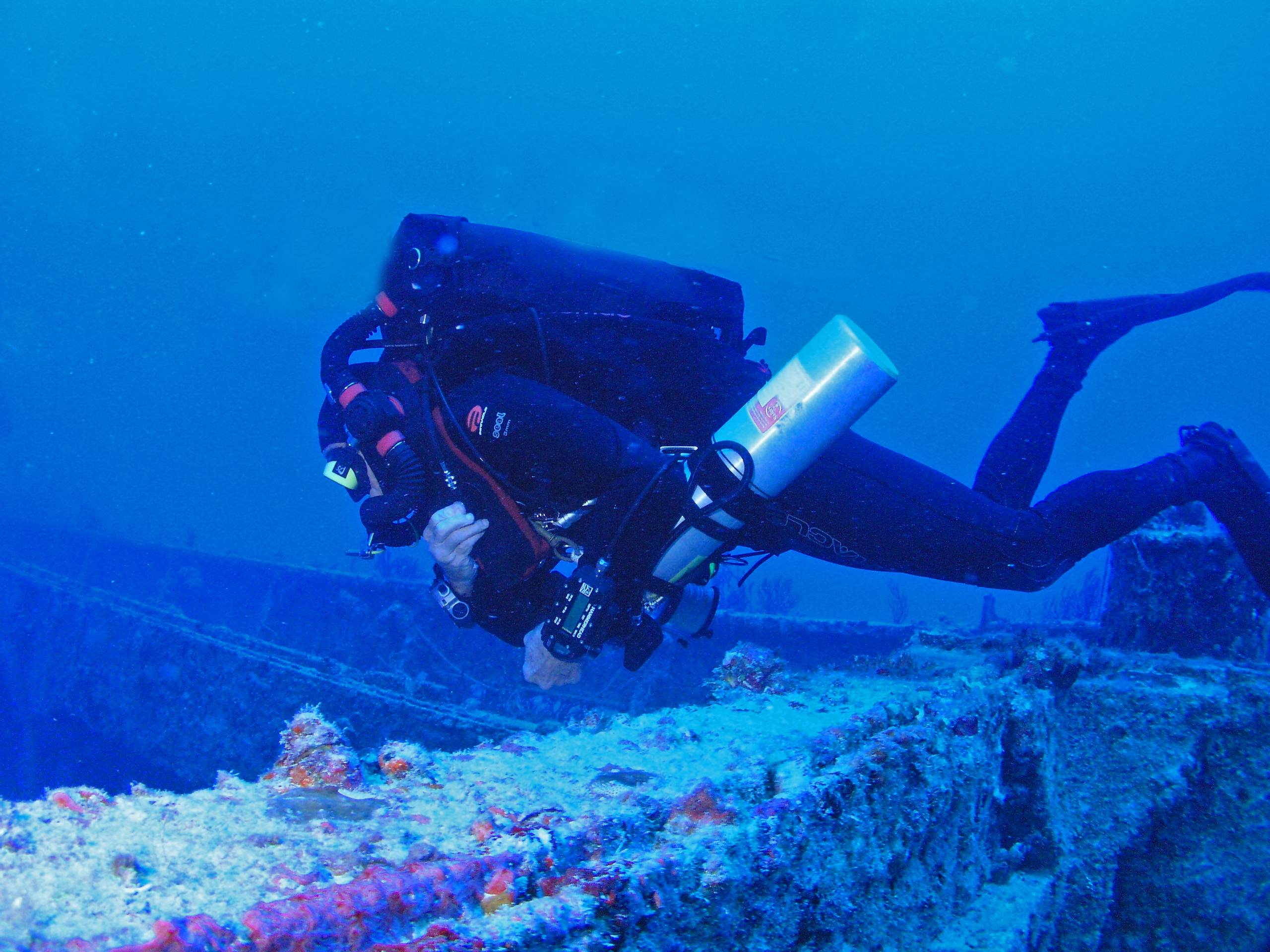
- Mount diving a closed circuit rebreather in Miami Beach (2007)
- Born: 21 March 1939
- Died: 19 January 2022 (aged 82); Florida
- Employer: University of Miami
- Website: web.archive.org/web/19970626124032/http://www.iantd.com/tom.html

Tom Mount (March 1939 – January 2022) was an American pioneering cave diver and technical diver.

Mount was born in March 1939. By 1967 he had made more cave dives than anyone else in the world, according to fellow caver Sheck Exley. In 1970-1 he was diving the Bahamian blue holes on Andros Island and helping Jacques Cousteau make the film The Secret of the Sunken Caves there. By 1972 he was experienced enough to lead a team of cave divers in a recovery operation. He was a founding member of NACD (the National Association for Cave Diving), the first cave diver training organization in the United States. He was the author of one of the first American cave diving texts, The Cave Diving Manual, three years after Sheck Exley's 1969 Dixie Cavern Kings Cave Diving Manual. The two collaborated with Rory Dickens and others on 1973's Safe Cave Diving. At the University of Miami's School of Marine and Atmospheric Science, Mount served as diving officer from 1969-1976, developing training curricula as well as procedures for mixed gas diving, considered exotic at the time. He supervised the FLARE (FLorida Aquanaut Research Expedition) and participated in Hydrolab. Mount's contribution to recreation scuba diving was acknowledged with the award of a SSI Platinum Pro 5000 Diver card in 1993. and a NOGI Award for 'Sports/Education' in 2000.

In 1991 Mount joined Dick Rutkowski in a diver training organization that Rutkowski had previously formed known as the International Association of Nitrox Divers or IAND, which was dedicated to teaching Nitrox to recreational divers. In 1992 Mount was named president and chief executive officer of the organization - a position that he held until 2005 - and the name of the organization changed to the International Association of Nitrox and Technical Divers or IANTD, so as to reflect the greater range of so-called "technical diving" certification courses that the organization had begun to teach, which were well outside the scope of the regular scuba diving courses then being taught by all the other recreational diver training organizations (i.e. PADI, NAUI, etc). At the time, and for several years thereafter, IANTD was thus the only technical diver training organization in the world. Mount was also one of the pioneers of cave diving and diver training and development of dive tables for helium-containing trimix as a breathing gas for diving. Mount remained a member of the board of directors of the IANTD.

Mount published a number of technical diving texts, including the Technical Diver Encyclopedia, Exploration and Mixed Gas Diving Encyclopedia and Tek Closed Circuit Rebreather.

He died on 19 January 2022, at the age of 82.

Mount Sink, a sinkhole in the Falmouth-Cathedral underwater cave system, was named after him.

== Awards ==
Tom Mount was given the Academy of Underwater Arts and Sciences (AUAS) NOGI Award in 2000 for his outstanding contribution in sports and education.

On 17 May 2014, TEKDiveUSA presented Tom Mount with the inaugural Lifetime Achievement Award.

On 8 October 2016, EUROTEK announced that Tom Mount was to receive the Lifetime Achievement Award for a lifetime of consistent contribution and discovery that has opened up the field of technical diving. (The nominees that year included Jill Heinerth, Jarrod Jablonski, Casey McKinlay and Martin Parker).

== Selected books ==
- Mount, T. (1972). Cave Diving Manual. High Springs, Florida: National Association for Cave Diving.
- Mount, T.; Dickens, R.; Exley, S. (1973). Safe Cave Diving. High Springs, Florida: National Association for Cave Diving.
- Mount, Tom; Ikehara, Akira J. (1975). Practical Diving: A Complete Manual for Compressed Air Divers. Coral Gables, Fla.: University of Miami Press. ISBN 0870242784.
- Mount, Tom (1 May 1998). Technical Diver Encyclopedia. Miami Shores, Florida: International Association of Nitrox and Technical Divers. ISBN 0915539047.
