= San Lucas Canyon =

San Lucas Canyon is a submarine canyon off Cabo San Lucas, Baja California Sur. The canyon is home to some spectacular submarine phenomena, namely the "rivers of sand" and sandfalls. These were first observed in 1959 by an expedition led by D. F. Shepard and including Conrad Limbaugh, James Steward, and Wheeler J. North. These features were documented by Robert F. Dill (1964) and dived, filmed and made famous by Jacques Cousteau.
