= Albert Tillman =

American educator and underwater diver

Albert Alvin Tillman
- Born: January 16, 1928; Los Angeles, California, U.S.
- Died: January 16, 2004 (aged 76); Seattle, Washington, U.S.
- Education: USC Sol Price School of Public Policy; Los Angeles State College
- Military career
- Allegiance: United States

Albert Alvin Tillman (January 16, 1928 – January 16, 2004) was an American educator and underwater diver.

== Biography ==
Tillman was born in Los Angeles, California. He became interested in marine and underwater life when, at age 10, he peered through a pair of goggles in the waters off Redondo Beach, California. He soon became a free diver and served in the United States Coast Guard at the end of World War II, where he had the opportunity to dive around the world. He attended the University of Southern California on a football scholarship and earned a bachelor's degree in public administration in 1950. He later earned additional degrees in Recreation Management, including a master of arts from Los Angeles State College in 1956.

Tillman and Bev Morgan developed the world's first public skin diving and SCUBA diving program while working for Los Angeles County, California in 1953. Tillman became a professor at California State College in Los Angeles (now California State University at Los Angeles) in 1956, and created the first university degree program in recreation and leisure studies, retiring in 1994. He also co-founded the Underwater Photographic Society with Zale Parry.

He opened the world's first dedicated dive resort, The Underwater Explorers Society (UNEXSO) in Freeport, Grand Bahama Island. The resort included a full staff of instructors, a dive store, restaurant, museum, science lab, pools, photographic labs, and a fleet of boats, and catered to millionaires, movie stars, politicians, and royalty.

Tillman co-founded the National Association of Underwater Instructors (NAUI), the first international SCUBA diving certification agency, with Neal Hess in 1960. He worked all over the world to make dive training safer and more widespread, and planned to co-author four books on the history of diving titled Scuba America with Zale Parry, although only one of the four volumes was completed before his death. The books are now being completed by his son Thomas Tillman and Zale Parry. His personal memories of the early days of the sport were published in his book titled "I Thought I Saw Atlantis." He oversaw Dave Woodward's invention of the octopus regulator at UNEXSO around 1965–6.

Along with Jacques-Yves Cousteau, Tillman was an original inductee into the International Scuba Diving Hall of Fame in 2000. He received many lifetime achievement awards and honors during the 1990s and early 2000s.

Aside from the tens of thousands of divers who have been certified by programs designed by Tillman he logged over 10,000 open water dives during his career and personally certified thousands of divers and instructors.

Tillman died on his 76th birthday, in 2004, of a cerebral hemorrhage.

== See also ==
- Aqua-Lung – Original name for open-circuit scuba equipment
- Sea Hunt – American action adventure television series from 1958 to 1961
