= Cora Roberton =

New Zealand wartime nurse

Cora Beattie Roberton
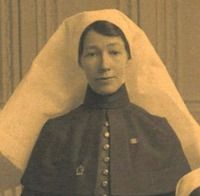
- Born: Cora Beattie Anderson; 4 March 1881; Auckland, New Zealand
- Died: 24 September 1962 (aged 81); Auckland, New Zealand
- Burial place: Purewa Cemetery, Meadowbank
- Military career
- Allegiance: New Zealand
- Branch: New Zealand Expeditionary Force
- Service years: 1915–1919
- Rank: Matron
- Unit: New Zealand Army Nursing Service
- Conflicts: First World War
- Awards: Royal Red Cross; Mentioned in Despatches

Cora Beattie Roberton, RRC (née Anderson; 4 March 1881 – 24 September 1962) was a decorated New Zealand nurse who ran several Allied hospitals in the United Kingdom during the First World War. In time, she was appointed matron to every major hospital for injured New Zealand soldiers in England.

At 21 she was one of the survivors of an Australian steamer disaster when it sank off the coast of New Zealand in 1902. After the collision, she was picked up by the last lifeboat to leave the sinking ship.

== Life and work ==
Born Cora Beattie Anderson in Auckland as one of eight children of Annie Buchanan and city engineer William Anderson, she attended the local Girls Grammar School from 1895 to 1898.

On 9 November 1902, Anderson was rescued on the last lifeboat to depart the passenger steamer Elingamite that sank 35 miles off the coast of New Zealand. She was rescued while standing in waist-deep water on the sinking steamer, and spent an estimated 25 hours, cramped and extremely cold in the open boat, before it found dry land. Of the 136 registered passengers on the steamer, fatalities from the collision numbered 28 passengers and 17 crew members, many of whom died from drowning or exposure to the elements. Her experience was detailed in the local papers.

Anderson went on to study nursing, graduating from the Thames Hospital in 1909 and finishing her midwife training at St Helen’s Hospital in Auckland. In 1910 she was appointed matron of the Townley Maternity Home in Gisborne, and in 1912 she became a district nurse for Māori patients in the Rotorua district.

=== War service ===
With the outbreak of the First World War in August 1914, Anderson was selected to serve among the first 50 nurses sent to England with the New Zealand Army Nursing Service (NZANS) under the direction of the British War Office. She was 34 years old when her group sailed for London on 8 April 1915. They soon left England to staff a hospital in Cairo, Egypt, where they treated many hundreds of soldiers wounded during the Gallipoli campaign.

In June 1916, Anderson was sent back to England and promoted to matron so she could take charge of No. 1 New Zealand General Hospital at Brockenhurst. In December 1916, she was made matron of No. 3 New Zealand General Hospital at Codford on the Salisbury Plain and then, in April 1917, she became matron of the Hornchurch Convalescent Hospital in Essex, near London. That facility could handle up to 2,500 patients and treat 400 patients a day in its physiotherapy department. By 1918, about 20,000 patients had been treated at Hornchurch. Anderson was eventually appointed the matron of each of the major New Zealand hospitals in England.

In 1917, the Minister of Public Health recommended that Anderson receive specialized training to administer anesthetics, which at that time, was given to patients only by doctors and not by nurses. Due to her own failing health in 1919, Anderson was sent on leave to New Zealand and was discharged from her official duties even though she remained on the Service and Temporary Reserve of the NZANS until her retirement in 1921. In total, she served overseas for more than four years. After the war, Anderson became President of the Auckland Branch of the Returned Army Nursing Sisters Association for several terms.

=== Personal life ===
On 1 October 1919, Anderson married Eric Butterfield Roberton and changed her name to Cora Roberton. Eric Roberton had been a farmer at Tahora in Taranaki, New Zealand, before the war. When he was wounded, he was sent to the New Zealand General Hospital at Brockenhurst in England in October 1917, where he met Anderson.

In 1925, the Robertons had a daughter Elizabeth May and a son Craig and farmed in the Taranaki until 1948, when they moved to Auckland. Cora Roberton died there on 24 September 1962 at the age of 81. She is buried in Purewa Cemetery in Meadowbank, Auckland, alongside her husband and daughter.

== Distinctions and awards ==
Anderson was awarded the following decorations and medals for her service in the First World War. The medals and badges are held at the Auckland War Memorial Museum.

- Royal Red Cross (1st Class) (RRC), 1919
- Associate Royal Red Cross (2nd Class) (ARRC), 1917
- 1914–1915 Star
- British War Medal 1914–1919
- Victory Medal, with oakleaf
