= Cathy Church =

American marine biologist, diver, photographer and educator

Catherine Church
- Born: 1945 (age 80–81)
- Other name: Cathy
- Occupations: marine biologist, SCUBA diver, underwater photographer and educator

Catherine "Cathy" Church (née Hoffman, born 1945) is an American marine biologist, SCUBA diver, underwater photographer and educator. Her underwater photography has shaped the genre for more than fifty years and her standards are still used today.

== Education ==
She received a BSc in biology from the University of Michigan in the mid-1960's, where she also learned to scuba dive. She studied marine invertebrate zoology at Hopkins Marine Station run by Stanford University in California. In the summer of 1966 she became interested in underwater photography and began capturing images from her dives. She received a MSc in marine biology from the University of Hawaii.

== Career ==
She did not pursue a career in science, as women were not easily accepted, so instead went on to teach science to 7th and 8th grade students in Gilroy, California, while pursuing underwater photography.

From 1969 to 1987, she was married to Jim Church, a pioneer in underwater photography. With him, she developed photography courses which were offered through the National Association of Scuba Diving Schools (NASDS), but due to NASDS attaching their own copyright to the course, the Churches never updated or continued to pursue this product. Cathy co-wrote and published four books on underwater photography and contributed articles to various magazines. For fifteen years, she was co-photo editor for Skin Diver Magazine. She has done photography for various clients, including Kodak, Nikon, the United States Virgin Islands and the Cayman Islands.

Church received a NOGI Award from the Academy of Underwater Arts and Science in 1985 and was the President of this esteemed organization two times. She was also awarded the Diving Equipment & Marketing Association's DEMA Reaching Out Award in 2000. She was named to the Women Divers Hall of Fame in 2000 and to the International Scuba Diving Hall of Fame in 2008.

She started teaching underwater summer courses at Spanish Bay Reef Resort in Grand Cayman in 1972, and continued teaching summer classes for seven more years. She then devoted her full time to teaching at her photo centre "Cathy Church's Photo Centre" in Grand Cayman where she is still actively taking pictures and teaching underwater Photography. She has also been awarded several other accolades including Diver of the Year in 2010 and later Pioneer of the Sea in 2019 from Beneath The Sea.
