= International Association of Nitrox and Technical Divers =

Recreational and technical scuba training and certification agency

- Abbreviation: IANTD
- Formation: 1985
- Type: NGO
- Purpose: Underwater Diver training
- Location: 119 NW Ethan Place, Lake City, Florida 32055
- Region served: Global
- CEO: Luis Augusto Pedro
- Key people: Dick Rutkowski
- Affiliations: United States RSTC
- Website: http://www.iantd.com/
- Formerly called: International Association of Nitrox Divers (IAND); European Association of Technical Divers (EATD)

The International Association of Nitrox and Technical Divers (IANTD) is a scuba diving organization concerned with certification and training in recreational diving, technical diving, cave diving, wreck diving, rebreather diving and diver leadership. Originally formed as the International Association of Nitrox Divers in 1985 by Dick Rutkowski it pioneered the introduction of Enriched Air Nitrox diving to the recreational diving community, before its name change in 1992 to reflect the more "technical" diving courses it had begun to teach. The European Association of Technical Divers (EATD) became part of IANTD in 1993.

== History ==
Dick Rutkowski, the former dive supervisor for the National Oceanic and Atmospheric Administration (NOAA), formed the International Association of Nitrox Divers (IAND) in 1985 to teach nitrox to recreational divers. This program was developed through NOAA during his tenure. In 1992 Tom Mount became the president and CEO, and the name of the organization was changed to the International Association of Nitrox and Technical Divers (IANTD). Billy Deans has also served as a director of IANTD. Prior to founding IAND, Rutkowski worked for Dr Wells and was director of the diver training at NOAA.

As the first agency to offer recreational certification in nitrox, IANTD grew at a steady pace from 1985 through February 1992 with the support of Hyperbarics International. The European Association of Technical Divers (EATD) was formed by Kevin Gurr, Richard Bull, and Rob Palmer in the UK in 1992 and merged into IANTD the following year. In 1992 Tom Mount became President of IANTD, a position that he held until 2005. During this period of time IANTD saw rapid growth as the diving community began to accept the use of technology such as nitrox. In 1992 the National Association of Underwater Instructors (NAUI) became the first mainstream US agency to accept IANTD qualifications, and the Sub-Aqua Association (SAA) became the first UK agency to recognise IANTD certifications in 1993.

In 2000, IANTD introduced a free-diver program prepared by Divetech Ltd of Grand Cayman.

On January 7, 2016 IANTD becomes the first agency in the scuba industry to acknowledge digitally validated logs as an official proof of diving experience, furthermore it declares Diviac its official digital logbook.

In March 2018, IANTD joined the United States RSTC and renewed its ISO certification.

== Qualifications ==
The IANTD qualification system was structured as follows as of January 2013.

=== Recreational programs ===
- Supervised Diver
- Open Water Diver
- Essentials Diver
- Advanced Open Water Diver
- Open Water Side Mount Diver
- Rescue Diver
- EANx Diver
- Deep Diver
- Advanced EANx Diver
- Speciality Diver
- Elite Diver
- Public Safety
- Open Water DPV Diver
- Decompression Specialist
- Self-sufficient Diver
- Diver First Aid
- Oxygen Administration
- Diving Medical Technician
- AED
- Hyperbaric Chamber Operator
- CPR
- EANx Blender
- Trimix Gas Blender
- LSS Service Technician
- Underwater Theatrical Performer
- Recreational Trimix Diver

=== Technical programs ===
- Technical diver
- Expedition Trimix Diver
- In Water Recompression
- Normoxic Trimix Diver
- Trimix Diver

=== Cave Programs ===
- Cavern Diver
- Introductory Cave Diver
- Cave Diver
- Limited Mine Diver
- Mine Diver
- Technical Cave Diver
- Rebreather Cave Diver
- Advanced Cave - Stage
- Advanced cave - side mount
- Advanced Cave - DPV
- Advanced cave - survey

=== Wreck program ===
- Wreck diver
- Rebreather Wreck Diver
- Advanced Wreck Diver
- Technical Wreck Diver

=== Rebreather programs ===
- Rebreather experience
- Recreational CCR Diver
- SCR Rebreather Diver
- CCR Diver
- pSCR Diver

=== Leadership programs ===
- Dive Master
- Cavern Dive Master
- Advanced EANx Supervisor
- Advanced Recreational Trimix Supervisor
