= Ocean Realm =

American magazine on underwater photography and scuba diving

Ocean Realm was a quarterly magazine dedicated to scuba diving, underwater photography and marine life. The magazine was established in 1988. It was published in San Antonio, Texas and was globally distributed to subscribers. The founder was Richard Stewart. He also was the publisher and editor-in-chief of the magazine.

Stan Waterman wrote essays for the magazine. The last issue of Ocean Realm was #57 dated Spring 2001.
