= Diviac =

Online booking site for diving holidays

- Company type: Private
- Industry: Scuba diving; Travel
- Founded: Zumikon, Switzerland (December 1, 2012)
- Headquarters: Zürich, Switzerland
- Website: diviac.com

Diviac is an online booking website for scuba holidays. Diviac started as a digital logbook for divers, the company focus changed in 2015 to scuba holidays.

== Timeline ==
Diviac was founded in December 2012 in Zumikon, Switzerland by Joel Perrenoud and Thomas Achhorner. The company was officially incorporated in April 2013.

In November 2013, the first version of Diviac Logbook was launched.

In December 2014, Diviac closed CHF 1 million in a financing round led by the StartAngels Network, a Swiss angel investor network.

In March 2015, Diviac Logbook releases two mobile apps for iOS and Android to access the logbook from phones and tablets.

In April 2015, the first version of the Diviac Travel website was launched. In the same month Diviac also acquired Scubadviser.com, a website collecting dive centres and liveaboards reviews.

In December 2015, Trekksoft and Diviac announced a partnership to offer a one-stop solution to dive centers for managing their bookings and increase their online distribution.

In November 2016, Diviac Eco Travel was introduced. This division of Diviac partners with major NGOs and research centers to offer eco-friendly holidays to divers and travelers. During these vacations, guests participate alongside marine experts in field studies and research activities.

As of December 2016, trips are offered in partnership with the Bimini Biological Field Station Foundation, Manta Trust and the Marine Wildlife Watch of the Philippines.

In January 2018, Diviac announced the acquisition of the company by PADI.

== Diviac Logbook ==
Diviac Logbook is a digital logbook that allows divers to keep track of their dives and trips, it serves as proof of dive experience and as a memoir of journeys and trips. Diviac Logbook is one of the few third-party digital logbooks endorsed by Scubapro.

In June 2015, Diviac and Suunto announce a partnership where Suunto users can connect to Diviac through Suunto’s DM5 software and the Movescount sports community, and upload their dives directly to Diviac's cloud-logbook.

In January 2016, the training agency IANTD made Diviac Logbook its official digital logbook and became the first agency to acknowledge digitally validated logs as official proof of diving experience.

== Diviac Travel ==
Diviac Travel is an online booking website specialized in scuba holidays. The website allows users to research and book diving and accommodation from liveaboards, dive resorts and dive centers worldwide. It claims to have one of the broadest offering on the market with thousands of destinations and dive operators in the platform.
