= Kelly Tarlton's Sea Life Aquarium =

Public aquarium in Auckland, New Zealand

- Kelly Tarlton's Sea Life Aquarium logo

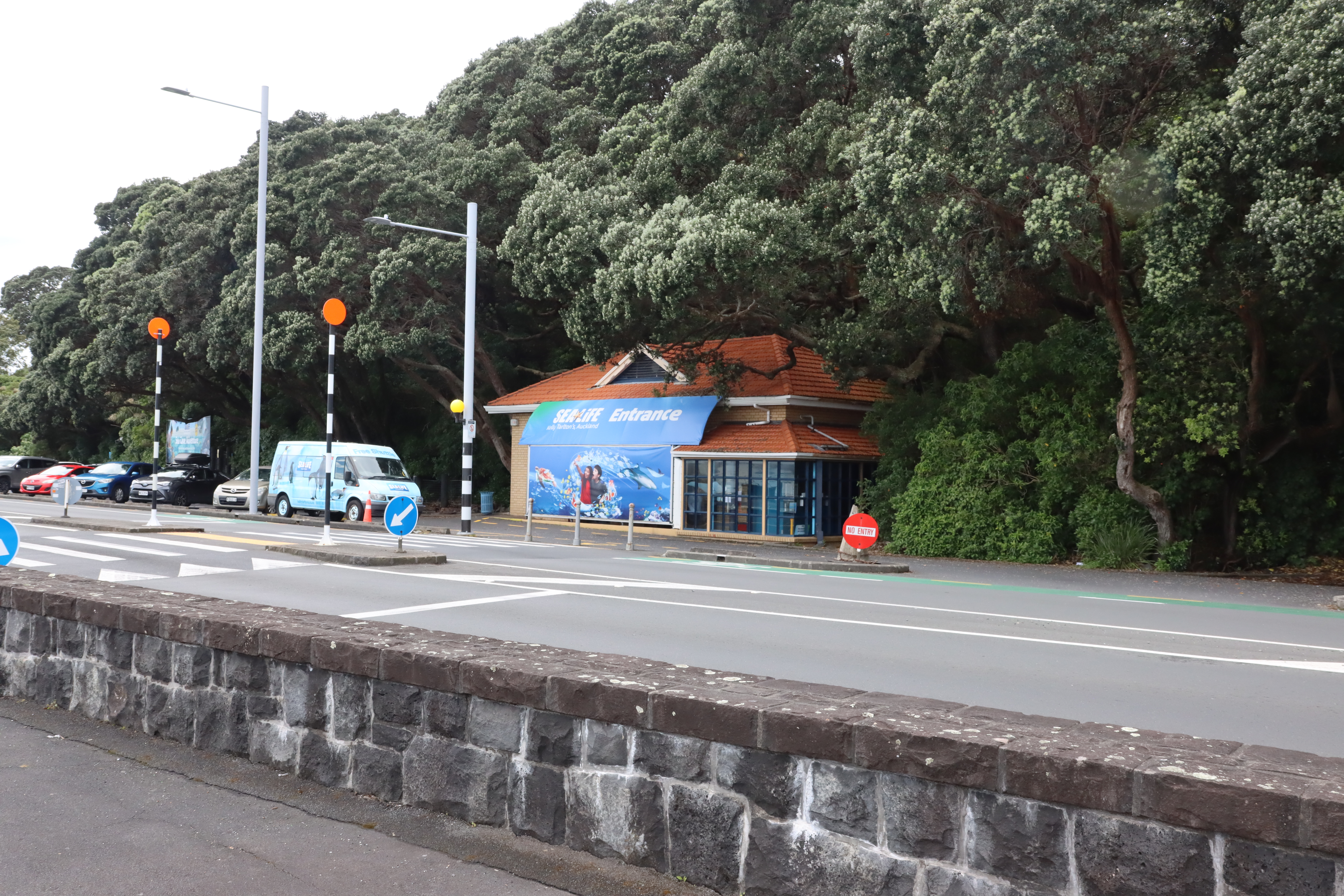
- Entrance to Kelly Tarlton's Sea Life Aquarium on Tamaki Drive
- Interactive map of Kelly Tarlton's Sea Life Aquarium
- 36°50′45″S 174°49′2″E
- Date opened: 25 January 1985; 41 years ago
- Location: 23 Tamaki Drive, Ōrākei, Auckland 1071, New Zealand
- No. of animals: 1500+
- No. of species: 50+
- Major exhibits: 8
- Owner: Merlin Entertainments
- Website: www.visitsealife.com/auckland/

Kelly Tarlton's Sea Life Aquarium (formerly Kelly Tarlton's Underwater World) is a public aquarium opened on 25 January 1985 in Auckland, New Zealand. Located at 23 Tamaki Drive, it was the brainchild of New Zealand marine archaeologist and diver Kelly Tarlton (1937–1985).

Built in disused sewage storage tanks, the aquarium used a new form of acrylic shaping, which allowed curved tunnels rather than viewing areas with flat panels only, as in previous aquariums. The project was also one of the first to use moving walkways for people to travel slowly through the viewing areas.

== History ==
In 1983, Tarlton proposed building an aquarium in unused sewage tanks underground on the Auckland waterfront. Fish would be viewed through a long acrylic tunnel.

The aquarium opened on 25 January 1985 after 10 months of construction. Tarlton developed a new method of building an acrylic tunnel by taking large sheets of clear acrylic, cutting them to size and heating them in an oven until they took the shape of the mould. Some of the sheets weighed over one tonne. Because of the refraction caused by light travelling through water, and the acrylic sheets used in the creation of the tunnel, the fish appear to be one third smaller than they are.

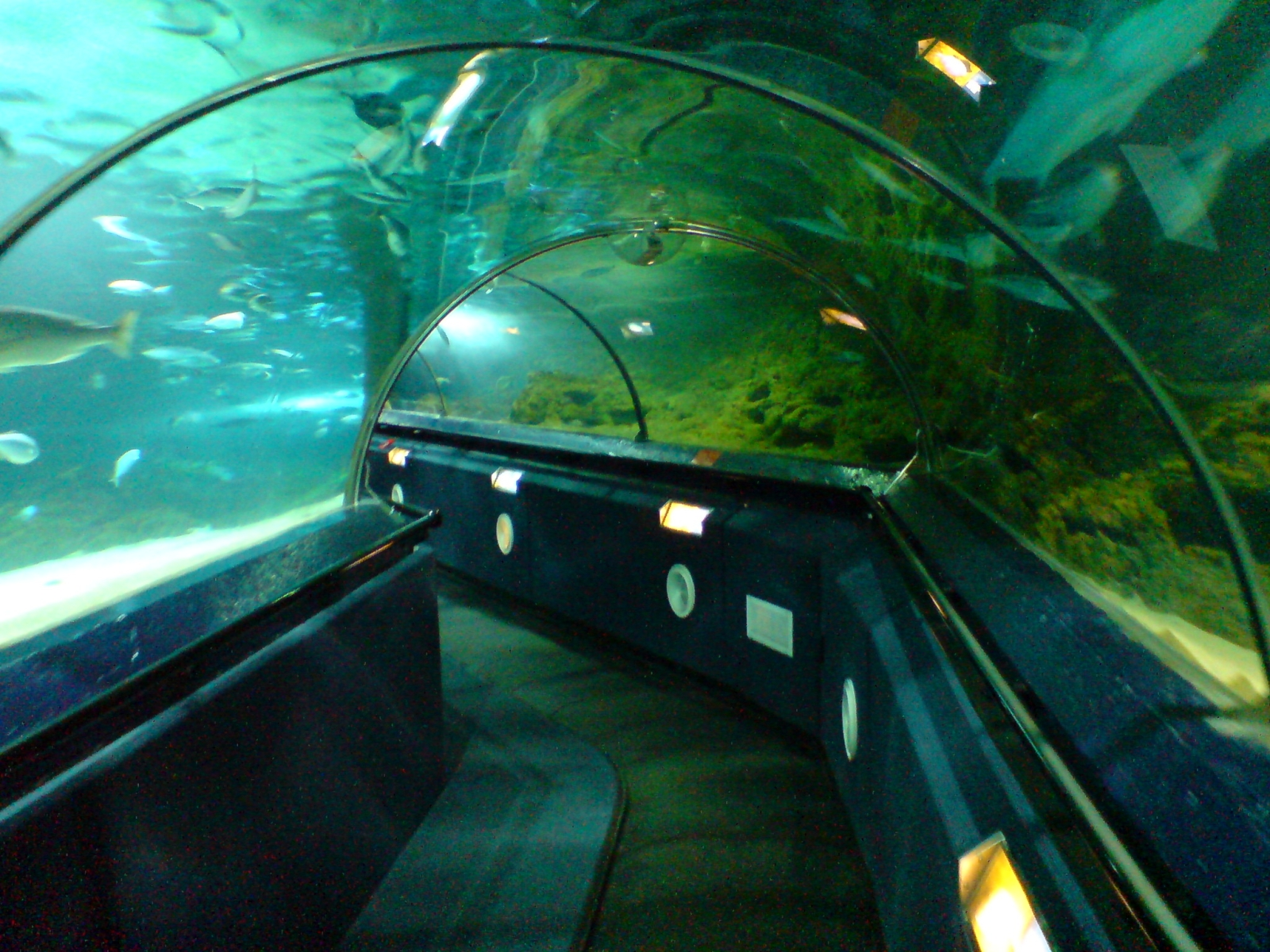
Tunnel at the aquarium

A 110-metre (360 ft) tunnel was created in sewage storage tanks that had been unused since the 1960s. The tanks are located below the suburb of Ōrākei, on Tamaki Drive and overlooking the Waitematā Harbour.

Once the tunnels were in place and the tanks filled to test for leaks (none were found) a seascape of caves and reefs was created using concrete before the basins were filled in one section with a careful selection of more than 1,800 marine creatures. Another section was filled with sharks (including bronze whaler, sevengill shark, wobbegong, school shark) and stingrays.

In 1994 the facility was expanded to include a replica of the hut used by Captain Robert Falcon Scott on his tragic expedition to Antarctica, as well as a colony of Antarctic penguins in a climate controlled exhibit.

In December 2004 the aquarium opened Stingray Bay, which features a giant 350,000-litre (92,000 US gal) open topped tank that is 2.6 metres (8 ft 6.4 in) at its deepest point and constructed of crystal clear acrylic for optimum viewing.

In 2008, Village Roadshow purchased the facility, for NZD $13 million.

In December 2010, Kelly Tarlton's received five new sand tiger sharks from the US.

In 2011, Village Roadshow sold Kelly Tarlton's Underwater World and other Sydney-based attractions to the Merlin Entertainments group.

In March 2012 Merlin Entertainments announced a $5.5 million upgrade introducing new exhibits, a new layout and a more interactive experience, due to open in September 2012. As part of the expansion, the aquarium was rebranded Kelly Tarlton's Sea Life Aquarium, bringing it in line with Merlin Entertainments' global Sea Life Centres brand. The upgrade and rebranding was launched on 29 September 2012.

== Facilities ==
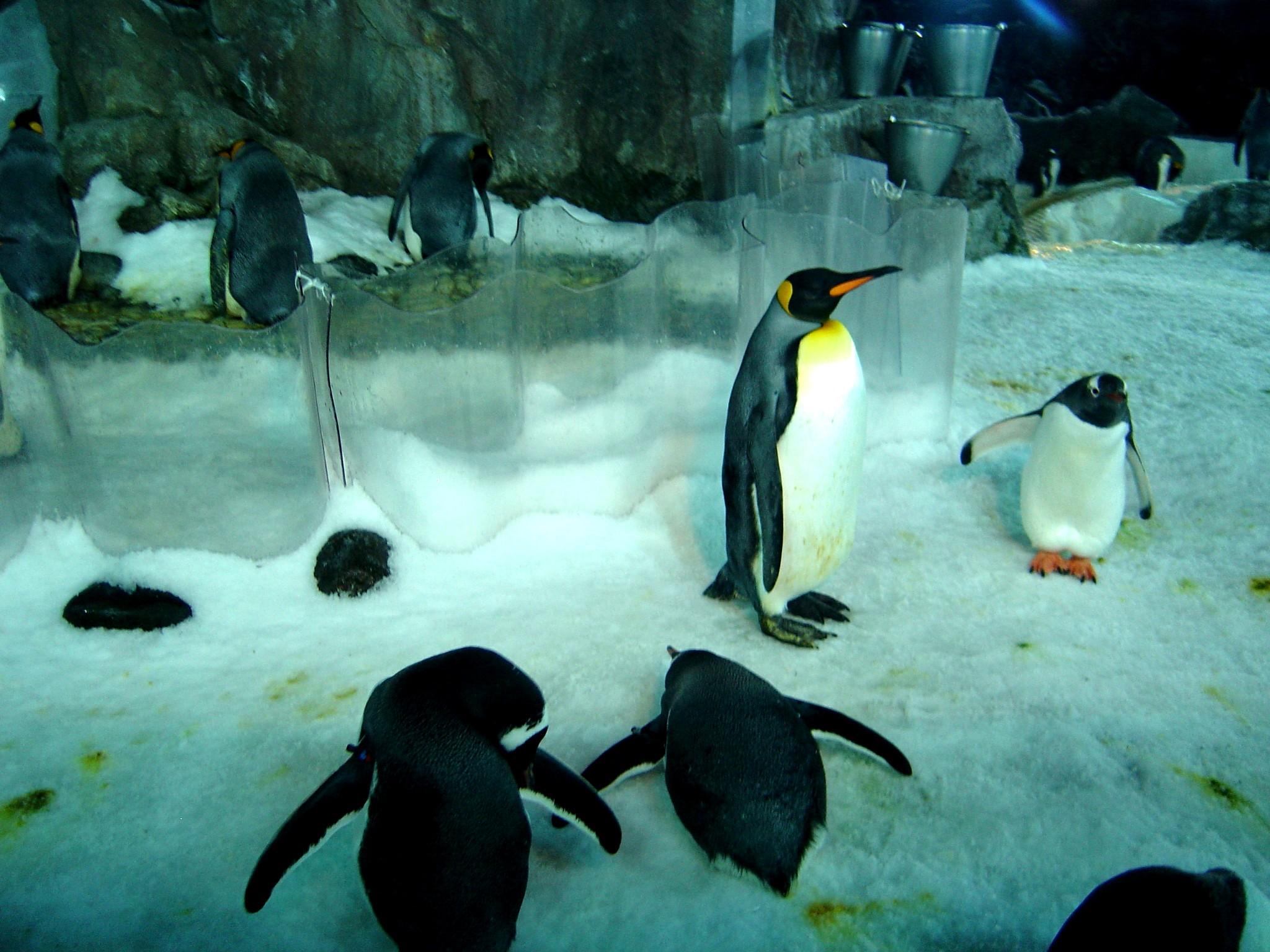
Penguins in the former Antarctic Encounter (now Antarctic Ice Adventure)

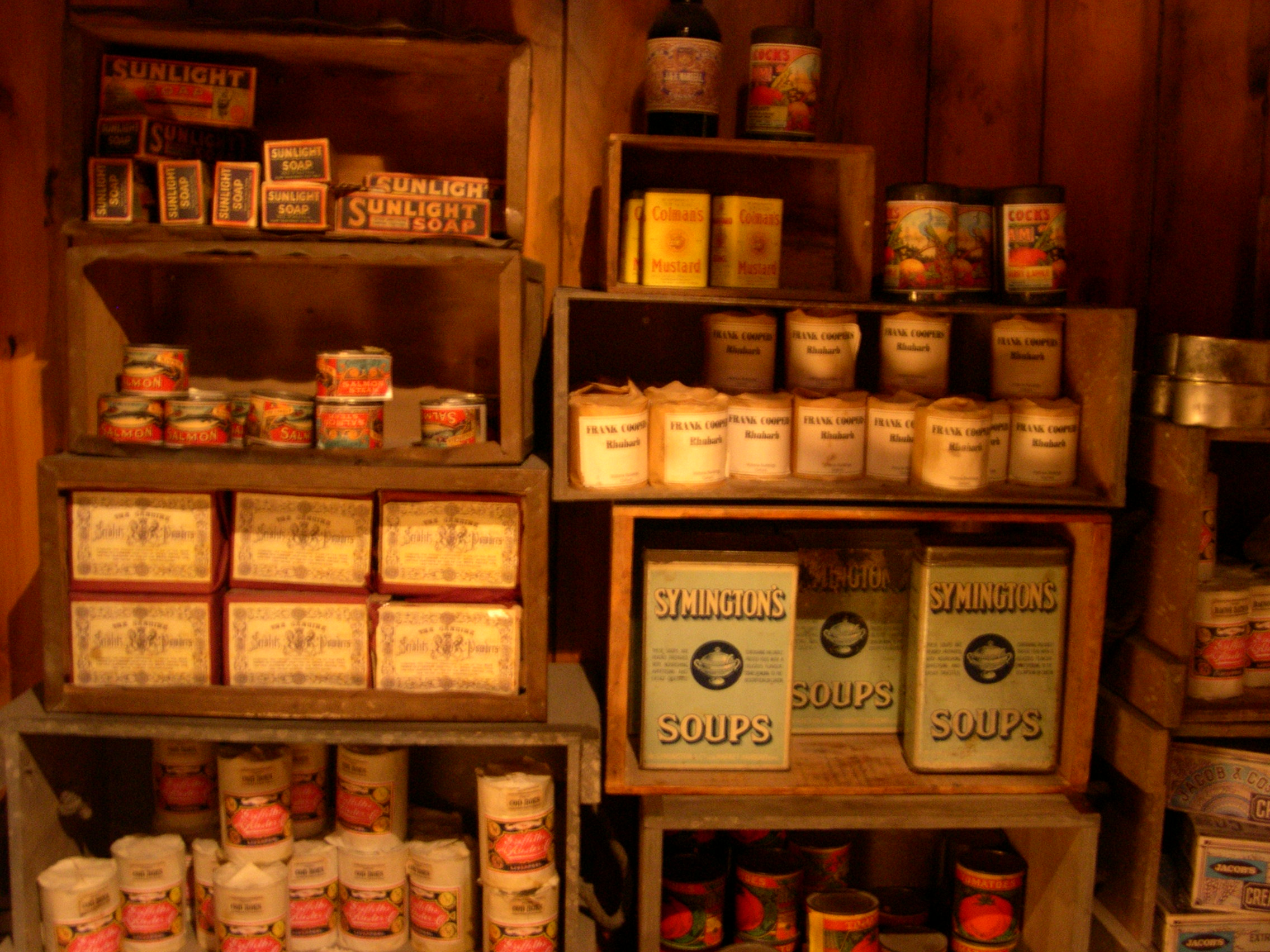
Recreation of Robert Scott's pantry

The aquarium's main features are the Antarctic Encounter and the Underwater World, but it also includes several other exhibits and several education rooms.

- Antarctic Ice Adventure and Scott Base (formerly Antarctic Encounter) – This exhibit was opened in 1994, and is the first exhibit encountered by visitors. Visitors can view the aquarium's penguins through glass in their temperature controlled habitat. Visitors then pass through a recreation of the hut used by Captain Robert Falcon Scott during his South Pole expedition in 1912. The aquarium has a colony of king penguins and gentoo penguins. A snowcat ride used to go around the area but was changed in 2012 to a walk around exhibit.
- NIWA Southern Oceans Discovery (formerly NIWA Interactive Room) – This room is located adjacent to Turtle Bay and aims to educate children about the marine world and Antarctica while entertaining them.
- Turtle Bay (formerly Stingray Bay) – Is a 350,000-litre (92,000 US gal) open topped acrylic tank. This tank contains rescue turtles being rehabilitated by Kelly Tarltons. Formerly this area was home to stingrays. This area of the aquarium has a refreshment kiosk.
- Pacific Shark Zone and Shipwreck Explorer (formerly Underwater World) – The original part of the aquarium. This 110-metre (360 ft) acrylic tunnel takes visitors through two tanks which can hold up to 2000 animals. The first tank (or predator tank) is filled mainly with shark species, and holds about 3,800,000 litres (1,004,000 US gal), while the second tank has mainly schooling fish such as blue mao mao.
- Fish Gallery and Seahorse Kingdom (formerly Sea Creatures) – This area contains smaller aquariums usually filled with single species. Here you can find; two tropical marine tanks, red bellied piranha, an octopus, sea horses, moray eels, crayfish plus stonefish and pufferfish in the Poisonous and Venomous fish tank. Adjacent to this area is the gift shop which also contains the exit.
