= Hans Hass Award =

Award in recognition of contribution made to the advancement of knowledge of the ocean

The Hans Hass Award was founded in 2002 by Leslie Leaney of the Historical Diving Society in the United States. It is awarded in recognition of contribution to the advancement of our knowledge of the ocean. The award consists of a personalized Fifty Fathoms watch (only from 2012-2018) together with a framed cast bronze plaque, designed by ocean artist Wyland, which depicts Hans Hass wearing an oxygen rebreather during his solo 1949 Red Sea expedition.

== Criteria ==
The criteria for nomination requires that individuals or organisations who, in the spirit of Hans Hass’ pioneering work in the fields of underwater science, technology, arts and literature, have excelled at an international level in any of those fields.

It is presented by the Historical Diving Society and was sponsored by the Swiss watch manufacturer Blancpain between 2013-2022. Due to the coronavirus pandemic, no awards were presented between 2019 and 2022.

== Award winners ==
Source: Hans Hass Institute

- 2003: Ernie Brooks II (USA), photographer
- 2004: James Cameron (Canada), diver and filmmaker
- 2005: Daniel Mercier, (France), underwater Film and Photography
- 2006: Stan Waterman, (USA), underwater Film and Photography
- 2007: Bev Morgan, (USA), dive equipment manufacturer; David Attenborough, (England), broadcaster, biologist, natural historian and author.
- 2010: Sylvia Earle, (USA), marine scientist
- 2012: Laurent Ballesta, (France), technical diver and film maker
- 2014: Weicheng Cui, (China), designer of deep ocean submersible Jiaolong and deep ocean technology
- 2016: Howard and Michele Hall, (USA), underwater film and photography
- 2018: Franz Bruemmer, (Germany), marine scientist and President of Verband Deutscher Sporttaucher (VDST)
- 2023: Patrick Lahey, (USA), Victor Vescovo, (USA), submersible design and construction, exploration
- 2024: David Doubilet and Jennifer Hayes (USA), underwater photographers

== See also ==
- List of environmental awards
- List of oceanography awards
