= John Christopher Fine =

American marine biologist, wreck diver and author

- Born: United States
- Occupations: Marine biologist, writer

John Christopher Fine of Scarsdale, New York is a marine biologist with a doctor of jurisprudence degree and has dived on shipwrecks all over the world. He is a Master Scuba Instructor and Instructor Trainer, and the author of over two dozen books on almost as many topics, including award-winning books dealing with ocean pollution. He has authored both fiction and non-fiction books.

The liaison officer of the United Nations Environment Programme and the Confédération Mondiale des Activités Subaquatiques, Fine is a fellow of the Explorers Club and a member of the Academy of Underwater Arts and Sciences, a recognition he received in honor of his numerous books in the field of juvenile education. He has been the recipient of international recognition for his pioneering work investigating toxic waste contamination of our land and water resources.

== Bibliography ==
- Treasures of the Spanish Main : shipwrecked galleons in the New World by John Christopher Fine (Guilford, Conn. : Lyons Press, ©2006) ISBN 1-59228-760-3, ISBN 978-1-59228-760-4, OCLC: 70265588
- Lost on the Ocean Floor : Diving the World's Ghost Ships by John Christopher Fine (Annapolis, Md. : Naval Institute Press, ©2005) ISBN 1-59114-275-X OCLC 54966253
- Macmillan/McGraw-Hill Science by Macmillan Publishing Company (Macmillan/McGraw-Hill, ©1995) OCLC: 32987796
- Creatures of the Sea by John Christopher Fine (New York : Atheneum, 1989) ISBN 0-689-31420-5, ISBN 978-0-689-31420-9 OCLC 19124941
- Sunken Ships & Treasure by John Christopher Fine (New York : Atheneum, 1986) ISBN 0-689-31280-6, ISBN 978-0-689-31280-9 OCLC 13218514
- Oceans in Peril by John Christopher Fine (New York : Atheneum, 1987) ISBN 0-689-31328-4, ISBN 978-0-689-31328-8 OCLC 14691973
- Making a Difference in the World by Lynne Cherry and John Christopher Fine (Katonah, N.Y. : Richard C. Owen, Publishers, ©2000) ISBN 1-57274-373-5, ISBN 978-1-57274-373-1 [OCLC 43567591]
- Free Spirits in the Sky by John Christopher Fine (New York : Atheneum; Toronto : Maxwell Macmillan Canada; New York : Maxwell Macmillan International, 1994) ISBN 0-689-31705-0 OCLC 27013735
- Seeing the Circle by Joseph Bruchac and John Christopher Fine (Katonah, N.Y. : R.C. Owen Publishers, ©1999) ISBN 1-57274-327-1, ISBN 978-1-57274-327-4 [OCLC: 41049652]
- The Hunger Road by John Christopher Fine (New York : Atheneum, 1988) ISBN 0-689-31361-6, ISBN 978-0-689-31361-5, OCLC: 16922853
- Racket Squad by John Christopher Fine (New York : Atheneum; Toronto : Maxwell Macmillan Canada; New York : Maxwell Macmillan International, 1993) ISBN 0-689-31569-4, ISBN 978-0-689-31569-5, OCLC: 25508784
- Big Stuff in the Ocean by John Christopher Fine (Golden, Colo. : Fulcrum Kids, ©1998) ISBN 1-55591-357-1, ISBN 978-1-55591-357-1, OCLC 38964126
- Diving for Treasure by John Christopher Fine (Katonah, NY : Richard C. Owens Publishers, 2000) ISBN 1-57274-391-3, OCLC 49633222
- Exploring Underwater Photography by John Christopher Fine (Medford, NJ : Plexus Pub., ©1986) ISBN 0-937548-07-3, OCLC 14239151
- Exploring the Sea: an Introduction to Marine Biology and Ocean Science by John Christopher Fine (Medford, NJ : Plexus Pub., 1982) ISBN 0-937548-03-0, OCLC 9377730
- The Boy and the Dolphin fiction by John Christopher Fine and Alek Kardas (Mount Desert, Me. : Windswept House, ©1990) OCLC 22891584
- Diving with Sharks by John Christopher Fine (New York: F. Watts, 2000) ISBN 0-531-11785-5, OCLC 41833964
- The Tested Man by John Christopher Fine (Mt. Desert, Me.: Windswept House Publishers, ©1994) ISBN 1-883650-00-3, OCLC 32276178
- Dive to the Coral Reefs produced by Lancit Media Productions by Ruth Heller; Paul P Sipiera and John Christopher Fine, VHS tape (Lincoln, NE : GNP, ©1985, 1994) OCLC: 30465159
- Dive to the Coral Reefs by Mark Mannucci; LeVar Burton; Elizabeth Taynton; Lancit Media Productions.; Great Plains National Instructional Television Library.; WNED-TV (Television station : Buffalo, N.Y.) VHS tape (Lincoln, NE : GPN, ©1989) OCLC 42496212
- Sunken Ships and Treasure by John Christopher Fine (Macmillan, 1986) ISBN 0-689-31280-6, OCLC: 32801622
