= Kelly Tarlton =

New Zealand marine archaeologist

- Born: 31 October 1937; Te Kōpuru, New Zealand
- Died: 17 March 1985 (aged 47)
- Citizenship: New Zealand
- Occupations: Marine archaeologist and treasure-hunter
- Known for: The founding of Kelly Tarlton's Underwater World, Auckland, New Zealand (1985)

Kelvin Ewart Tarlton (31 October 1937 – 17 March 1985) was a marine archaeologist and treasure-hunter who established Kelly Tarlton's Underwater World in Auckland, New Zealand.

== Early life, education and family ==
Tarlton was born on 31 October 1937 in Te Kōpuru in the Northland Region of New Zealand. His parents were Elsie Alexander and Ewart Fritz Tarlton and he had one sister, Althea. His father was an engineer. They moved to Auckland where he went to Pasadena Intermediate School, although he spent nine months in hospital owing to a reaction to penicillin and a kidney condition. The family moved to Christchurch where he attended Christchurch Boys’ High School. On leaving school he qualified as a telephone exchange technician at the Post and Telegraph Department in 1961.

Kelly was married to Rosemary Tarlton from 1965 to his death in 1985. They had two daughters Nicole and Fiona. Kelly's grandson Tane Tarlton was born in 2001.

== Connection to the ocean ==
Recreationally he was a mountaineer and joined the Canterbury Mountaineering Club. He then became a diver joining the Canterbury Underwater Club inspired by Jacques Cousteau's movie The Silent World. His first dive was in 1956. He set a New Zealand freediving record in 1959 at Curious Cove, Queen Charlotte Sound, (depth of 24 metres). Over the next few years, Tarlton organised and took part in diving trips in places such as Wuvulu Island and the Poor Knights Islands, moving to live in Whangarei near the Poor Knights, which is now a marine reserve. During these trips Tarlton collected marine specimens, discovered new species, and explored and developed ways of taking photographs and films underwater.

Tarlton became a professional diver in 1966. He worked on construction and also salvaged and explored many shipwrecks in New Zealand waters and around the world including in the late 1970s with Mel Fisher looking for treasure in the Caribbean for the Atocha and Santa Margarita (sunken Spanish galleons). In 1974 he and two others found items from the steamer Tasmania which sank off Mahia Peninsula in 1897. In 1970 and 1975 Tarlton led expeditions to the Auckland Islands in search of the General Grant shipwreck (1866) and its gold. In 1980 he was part of an international consortium searching for gold bullion in Lutine, sunk off the Netherlands in 1799.

== Kelly Tarlton's Underwater World ==
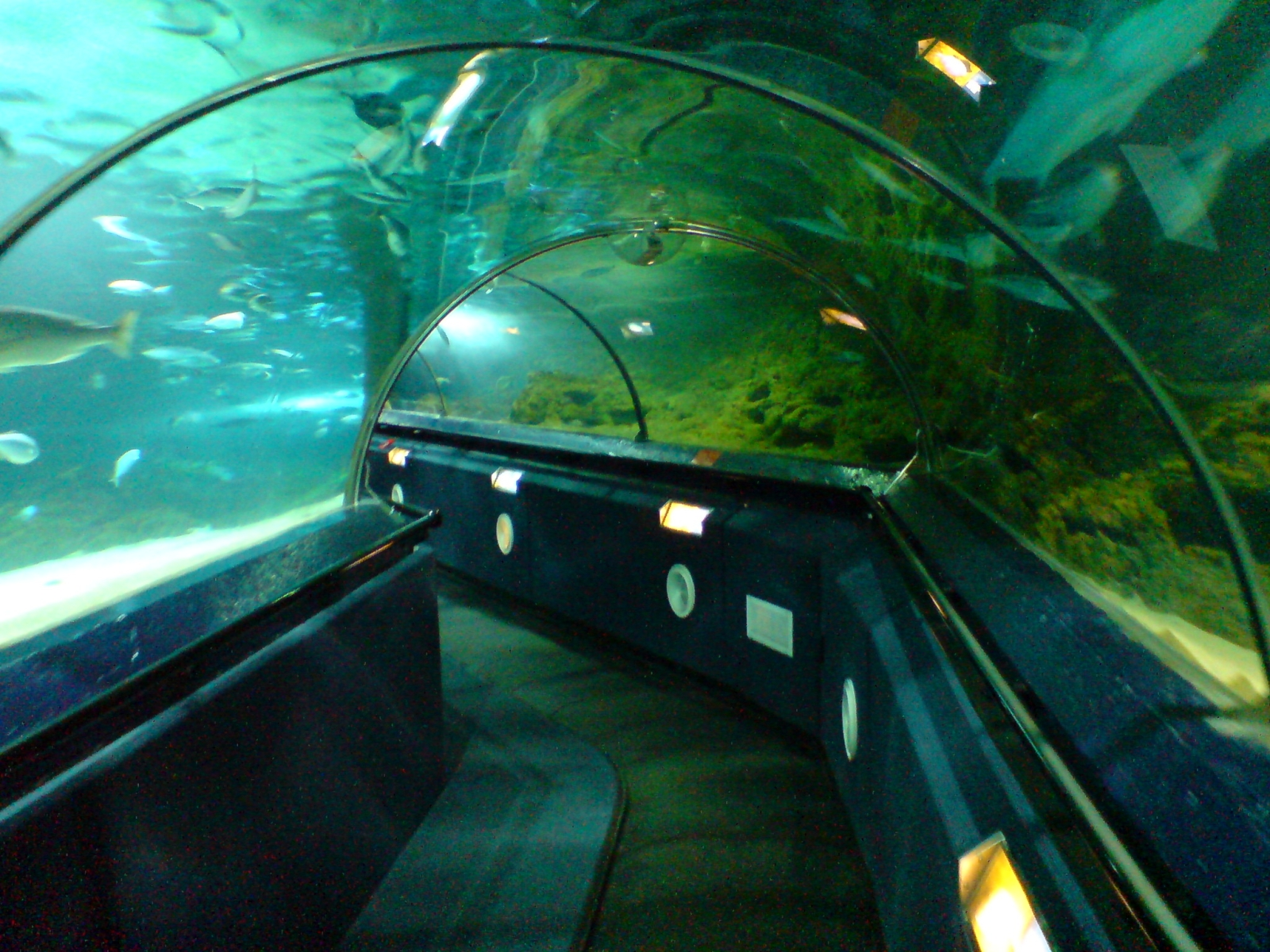
Tunnels through the aquarium at Kelly Tarlton's Underwater World

After his time in the Netherlands, Tarlton decided to build a new style of aquarium. The attraction was constructed in a collection of disused municipal stormwater and sewerage tanks in Auckland, and opened by Tarlton in 1985, as Kelly Tarlton's Underwater World. The design of the aquarium was innovative at the time. Prior to its construction, aquariums typically had tanks with flat glass fronts for visitors to look through. Tarlton's design, with its curved acrylic tunnels underwater that visitors go through on a conveyor belt, looking all around at the underwater life in the tanks, has been influential for many aquariums overseas. The aquarium was designed to replicate a reef zone from the Hauraki Gulf. In 2015 the aquarium still held a stingray caught by Tarlton 30 years previously.

== Kelly Tarlton's Museum of Shipwrecks ==
Tarlton converted the old sugar lighter 'Tui' into a Museum of Shipwrecks tourist attraction after relocating the barque to Waitangi, then undertaking extensive renovations, adding masts and rigging. Artefacts displayed in the museum were recovered off New Zealand shipwrecks from expeditions led by Kelly with his dive team, such as the Rothschild's Jewels from the Tasmania, gold and silver coins from the SS Elingamite and a cannon off the shipwrecked L'Alcmène.

The museum won two national tourism awards and closed in 2002:

- 1974 Busk Cup for the most outstanding contribution to Tourism in Northland
- 1977 Tourism Design Award for meritorious planning of a tourist facility, from the NZ Minister of Tourism

The Tui was demolished after a suspicious early morning fire on 4 June 2025 started in the rear of the ship. At the time the Tui was owned by Kerikeri-based TriOceans marine research institute, which had begun restoring the vessel for use as a community space and marine education facility.

== Jean de Surville's Anchors ==
In 1974 Kelly Tarlton was the first to locate one of the three massive anchors dropped by French explorer Jean de Surville off his ship St Jean Baptiste in Doubtless Bay in 1769. This de Surville anchor is mounted on the entrance wall of Te Papa. That anchor and its twin anchor are the earliest authenticated European artefacts in New Zealand. Tarlton located a third de Surville anchor in 1982 which remains on the seabed.

== Awards ==
Kelly Tarlton has been posthumously inducted into three Halls of Fame:

- the International Scuba Diving Hall of Fame in the Cayman Islands in 2012.
- the International Association of Amusement Parks and Attractions (IAAPA) Hall of Fame in Hong Kong in 2018. On the IAAPA's 100th Anniversary, Tarlton was the first Australasian recipient of an IAAPA award for designers of the world's top attractions.
- the New Zealand Business Hall of Fame in Auckland in 2023.

== Death ==
Tarlton died unexpectedly from a heart condition in 1985 only seven weeks after Kelly Tarlton's Underwater World was opened.

== Sources cited ==
- Grzelewski, Derek (2007). "Kelly Tarlton". New Zealand Geographic.
- Townsend, Lynette; Burgess, Sarah (2020). "Story: Tarlton, Kelvin Ewart (Kelly)". Dictionary of New Zealand Biography.
- Locker-Lampson, Steve (1996a). Throw Me The Wreck Johnny: Memories of Kelly Tarlton, the Man Behind the Legend. Auckland: Halcyon Press. ISBN 9780908685684. OCLC 45412078.
- Locker-Lampson, Steve (3 March 1995 – 18 January 1996). "Interviews about Kelly Tarlton" (Oral history). National Library of New Zealand.
