= Dee Scarr =

Environmentalist, marine naturalist, and scuba diver

- Occupations: Marine naturalist, environmentalist, scuba educator
- Employer: Bonaire National Marine Park
- Known for: Touch the Sea program
- Spouse: David Batalsky
- Awards: PADI-SeaSpace Environmental Awareness Award

Dee Scarr is an American environmentalist, marine naturalist, and scuba diver who lives and works in Bonaire. She is known for her work in marine conservation and environmental education, particularly through the creation of the Touch the Sea program, which promotes respectful interaction with marine ecosystems. Scarr has collaborated with the Bonaire National Marine Park and has been recognized internationally for her contributions to reef preservation and public awareness about marine life. In 2000, she was inducted into the Women Divers Hall of Fame.

== Career ==
Scarr received bachelor's and master's degrees in English and rhetoric and public address from the University of Florida and taught high school English, public speaking and debate. Afterward, she became a scuba instructor in Florida in 1974 and began her diving career on the island of San Salvador. Dee arrived Bonaire in 1980 and started working in the Bonaire National Marine Park. In 1982 she created the diving program Touch the Sea. In 1985 she married David Batalsky. Between 1988 and 1991, Scarr and her workmates tied more than 600 sponges back onto pilings beneath Bonaire's Old Pier in Touch the Sea's Sponge Reattachment Project. In the mid-1990s she surveyed Bonaire's harbor area, removing trash, establishing misused areas and informing the Bonaire Marine Park to educate misusers. The first major recognition of Scarr's work was in 1991, when she was the second recipient of the PADI-SeaSpace Environmental Awareness Award, after Jacques Yves Cousteau.

Scarr was recognized and inducted into the Inaugural Roster 2000 of the Women Divers Hall of Fame at the Beneath the Sea Exposition at the Meadowlands Exposition Center, New Jersey, on 25 March 2000. She was also an inaugural member of the Women Divers Hall of Fame and SSI's Platinum Pro Divers, those with more than 5000 dives; Scarr has logged over 7000 dives. After realizing that dive training agencies did not provide critical information about living coral to their students, she founded Action in Behalf of Coral in 2005. In 2006 she was awarded Captain Don Stewart's Accolade Award for "making knowledge of the sea fun and spreading desire in others to learn and become themselves part of our sea." In 2007 she was awarded the Boston Sea Rovers Diver of the Year Award, the Beneath the Sea Diver of the Year Award for Environment and the Underwater Club of Boston's Paul Revere Spike. In 2008, at the 49th Annual NOGI Awards Gala, she received the Academy of Underwater Arts and Sciences (AUAS) NOGI Award for Distinguished Service, one of the oldest and most prestigious awards in the diving industry.

Dee has written three books: Touch the Sea, about interactions with marine animals; The Gentle Sea, about undersea creatures likely to be encountered by divers; and a children's book, Coral's Reef. For more than a decade Scarr wrote monthly articles about marine animals and their behaviors for Dive Training magazine, and she currently writes for The Bonaire Reporter about marine animals. She was the photographer for the original Guide to the Bonaire Marine Park and contributed to the second edition of the guide.
