= Richard D. Vann =

American academic and consultant at Divers Alert Network

Richard Deimel Vann is an American academic and diver.

== Positions ==
Vann is a consultant was a Divers Alert Network, Assistant Professor Emeritus in Anesthesiology at Duke University Medical Center, and safety officer and director of applied research at Duke University Medical Center,

== Speaker ==
- 2008 Divers Alert Network Technical Diving Conference. – Video of "Oxygen Toxicity" lecture by Dr. Richard Vann (free download, mp4, 86MB).
- 2013 DEMA Show, Orlando "Art and Science of Rebreather Diving, Project Dive Exploration: 1995-2008, Evidence-Based Decompression".

== Works ==
- Vann RD, Denoble PJ, Pollock NW (2014). "Rebreather Forum 3 Proceedings. AAUS / DAN / PADI: Durham, North Carolina" (PDF).
- Foster, Philip P.; Pollock, Neal W.; Conkin, Johnny; Dervay, Joseph P.; Caillot, Nicolas; Chhikara, Raj S.; Vann, Richard D.; Butler, Bruce D.; Gernhardt, Michael L. (2013). "Protective Mechanisms in Hypobaric Decompression". Aviation, Space, and Environmental Medicine. 84 (3): 212–224(14). doi:10.3357/asem.3314.2013. PMID 23513282.
- Mitchell Simon J, Bennett Michael H, Bird Nick, Doolette David J, Hobbs Gene W, Kay Edward, Moon Richard E, Neuman Tom S, Vann Richard D, Walker Richard, Wyatt HA. (2012) "Recommendations for rescue of a submerged unresponsive compressed-gas diver". In: Undersea & Hyperbaric Medicine Journal. 2012; Volume 39, Issue 6, Pages 1099-1108
- Dr Richard D Vann PhD, Frank K Butler MD, Simon J Mitchell FANZCA, Prof Richard E Moon MD. (2011). "Decompression Illness". In: The Lancet. January 2011; Volume 377, Issue 9760, Pages 153 - 164
- Longphre JM, Denoble PJ, Moon RE, Vann RD, Freiberger JJ (2007). "First aid normobaric oxygen for the treatment of recreational diving injuries". Undersea Hyperb Med. 34 (1): 43–9. PMID 17393938. Archived from the original on December 6, 2011.
- Vann RD, Pollock NW, Freiberger JJ, Natoli MJ, Denoble PJ, Pieper CF (2007). "Influence of bottom time on preflight surface intervals before flying after diving". Undersea Hyperb Med. 34 (3): 211–20. PMID 17672177. Archived from the original on February 17, 2012.
- Vann RD, Pollock NW, Pieper CF, Murdoch DR, Muza SR, Natoli MJ, Wang LY (2005). "[Abstract] Statistical models of acute mountain sickness". High Alt Med Biol. 6 (1): 32–42. doi:10.1089/ham.2005.6.32. PMID 15772498. In: 2005 Spring; 6(1):32-42.
- Pollock NW, Natoli MJ, Gerth WA, Thalmann ED, Vann RD (November 2003). "Risk of decompression sickness during exposure to high cabin altitude after diving". Aviat Space Environ Med. 74 (11): 1163–8. PMID 14620473.
- Pollock Neal W, Hobbs Gene W, Natoli Michael J, Hendricks David M, Gabrielova Ivana, Delphia Bruce C, Vann Richard D (2000). "REMO2: an O2 rebreather for use in emergency medical applications". Wilderness Environ Med. 11 (1): 60.
- Natoli, MJ; Hobbs, GW; Pollock, NW; Stolp, BW; Corkey, WB; Gabrielova, I; Hendricks, DM; Schinazi, EA; Almon, AK; Pieper, CF; Vann, RD (2000). "[Abstract] Oxygen Enhanced Breath-Hold: Immersion and Temperature Effects".
- Neal W. Pollock, Richard D. Vann, Edward D. Thalmann and Claus EG Lundgren. (1997). "Oxygen-Enhanced Breath-hold Diving, Phase I: Hyperventilation and Carbon Dioxide Elimination". In: EJ Maney, Jr and CH Ellis, Jr (Eds.) Diving for Science...1997. Proceedings of the American Academy of Underwater Sciences (17th Annual Scientific Diving Symposium).
- Vann, RD; Gerth, WA; Southerland, DG; Stanton, GR; Pollock, NW; Kepper, W; Heinmiller, P (1992). "[abstract] No-Stop Repetitive N2/02 Diving With Surface Interval 02 (SI02): PHASE II". Undersea and Hyperbaric Medical Society, Inc. Annual Scientific Meeting Held June 22–27, 1992. Archived from the original on December 26, 2013.
- Vann RD, Feezor MD (1983). "An experimental model of bubble formation in CAES plants". J Energy. 7 (6): 737–738. doi:10.2514/3.62725.
- Vann RD, Grimstad J, Nielsen CH (1980). "Evidence for gas nuclei in decompressed rats". Undersea Biomed Res. 7 (2): 107–112. PMID 7404848.
- Vann RD, Clark HG (1975). "Bubble growth and mechanical properties of tissue in decompression". Undersea Biomed Res. 2 (3): 185–194. PMID 15622738.

== Awards ==
- Johnson Space Center Group Achievement Award (STS134/ULF6 In-Suit Light Exercise Team), National Aeronautics and Space Administration (NASA), September 2011
- 2012 Albert R Behnke Award
- 2014 Recipient of the Aerospace Medical Association’s John Ernsting Award
- 2014 Academy of Underwater Arts and Sciences NOGI Award for Science
- 2014 EUROTEK Media Award (Rebreather Forum 3 Conference Proceedings)
- 2015 DEMA Reaching Out Award for Science and Research - 'Tribute Film'
