= Hillary Hauser =

Journalist, Underwater Diver, Environmentalist

- Born: 1944 (age 81–82); Palo Alto, California
- Citizenship: USA
- Education: B.A. English Literature
- Alma mater: University of Washington
- Occupations: Writer, environmental activist
- Writing career
- Language: English
- Genre: Non-fiction
- Subjects: Oceans, adventure, underwater diving, environment
- Notable work: Call to Adventure
- Notable awards: NOGI Award for Distinguished Service 2009 from the Academy of Underwater Arts & Sciences
- Website: healtheocean.org

Hillary Rika Hauser (born 1944) is an American photojournalist and environmental activist with a focus on the oceans — underwater diving adventure, politics, and conservation. In 2009, in recognition of her ocean environmental work as it relates to underwater diving, Hauser received the NOGI Award for Distinguished Service from the Academy of Underwater Arts and Sciences. In 2013, the Academy elected Hauser as president of its board of directors.

== Writer ==
Hauser is an author, journalist and news reporter, and has six published books about the sea and underwater exploration, as well as numerous articles in major periodicals including National Geographic, Geo, Islands, Esquire, Redbook, The Surfer’s Journal, Reader’s Digest, and the Los Angeles Times. From 1969 through 1977, she was the West Coast stringer for Ocean Science News Washington D.C., and from 1981 to 1986, she was the ocean/marine reporter for the Santa Barbara News-Press.

== Diver ==
Hauser started scuba diving in 1966 and was an editor of Skin Diver Magazine from 1969 to 1971. In 1979 she became the publicist for the Diving Equipment Manufacturers (now Marketing) Association (DEMA), and came up with the bumper sticker program, "Discover Diving", a label that went on to become a major promotional jingle in the dive world, as well as a title to a magazine. She has made over 5,000 dives and was inducted into the Women Divers Hall of Fame in 2000.

== Environmental activist ==
An environmental activist, in 1998, Hauser co-founded Heal the Ocean, a 3,000-member environmental advocacy group in Santa Barbara, California, and serves as its executive director. The organization focuses on how wastewater technology impacts the ocean, facilitating wastewater treatment plant upgrade, and removal of septic tanks from creeks, marshes, bays, and beaches. For this, and other work, Hauser and Heal the Ocean have been commended with recognition from the U.S. Congress, as well the Central Coast (California) Regional Water Quality Control Board (2006, 2008), the California State Assembly (2009), and in 2-13 a Joint Assembly/Senate Resolution (No. 404) from the California Legislature (Jackson/Williams). For their 15 years of working to remove septic systems from 7 miles of south Santa Barbara County beaches, including the world-famous Rincon surf break, Hauser and Heal the Ocean organization received a Commendation from the Regional Water Quality Control Board on January 19, 2015, and commendations also came from the California State Senate and the Santa Barbara County Board of Supervisors. Singer-songwriter Jack Johnson included Hauser on his 2017 list of 13 Coastal Heroes for Coastal Living Magazine.

== Classical pianist ==
A lifelong classical pianist, Hauser served as a classical music reviewer for the Santa Barbara News-Press from 1981 through 1996. In 2000 Hauser created, along John Robinson, the record label Tavros Records, through which she produced recordings of Rachmaninoff Trios and Chopin solo piano works that have won high ratings in the Penguin Guide to Recorded Classical Music.

== Bibliography ==
- "In the Basement of Skyscrapers (Diving the Big Wave Reefs of the World: Waimea, Jaws, Pipeline and Mavericks)," The Surfer’s Journal, 2003, vol. 12 No. 3
- "Shipwrecked with Jeff Johnson (paddling from Maui to Molokai)," The Surfer’s Journal, 2000, vol. 9 No. 5
- Avonturen Onder Water, VIPMEDIA, 1997, ISBN 90-70206-53-6
- Abenteur Unter Wasser. Jahr Verlag, 1997, ISBN 3-86132-221-8
- Book of Marine Fishes, Best Pub Co., 1995, ISBN 978-1559920254
- Book of Fishes, 2nd Edition, 1992, Gulf Publishing Co. ISBN 155992054-8
- The Adventurous Aquanaut, 1991, Best Publishing Co., ISBN 0-941332-14-4
- Skin Diver Magazine’s Book of Fishes, Pisces Books, 1987, ISBN 978-0866360210
- Call to Adventure, Bookmakers Guild, 1987, ISBN 978-0917665189
- "History of Diving," Compton’s Encyclopedia and Fact-Index, 1986, ISBN 0852294352
- "Exploring a Sunken Realm in Australia," National Geographic, 1984, Vol 165. No. 1
- "Living World of the Reef" (with Bob Evans), Walker & Co., 1978, ISBN 978-0802706027
- Scuba diving (Women in Sports), Harvey House, 1976, ISBN 978-0817854522
- "Heal The Ocean Santa Barbara Benefit: Hillary Hauser for Clean Water and Environment," Santa Barbara Arts TV YouTube Partner Global News,
- Heal the Ocean, Newsletter 2013
- Heal the Ocean, Newsletter 2014
- Heal the Ocean, Newsletter 2015
- Heal the Ocean, Newsletter 2016
- Heal the Ocean, Newsletter 2017
- Heal the Ocean, Newsletter 2018
- Heal the Ocean, Newsletter 2019
