= James Cahill (author) =

British author

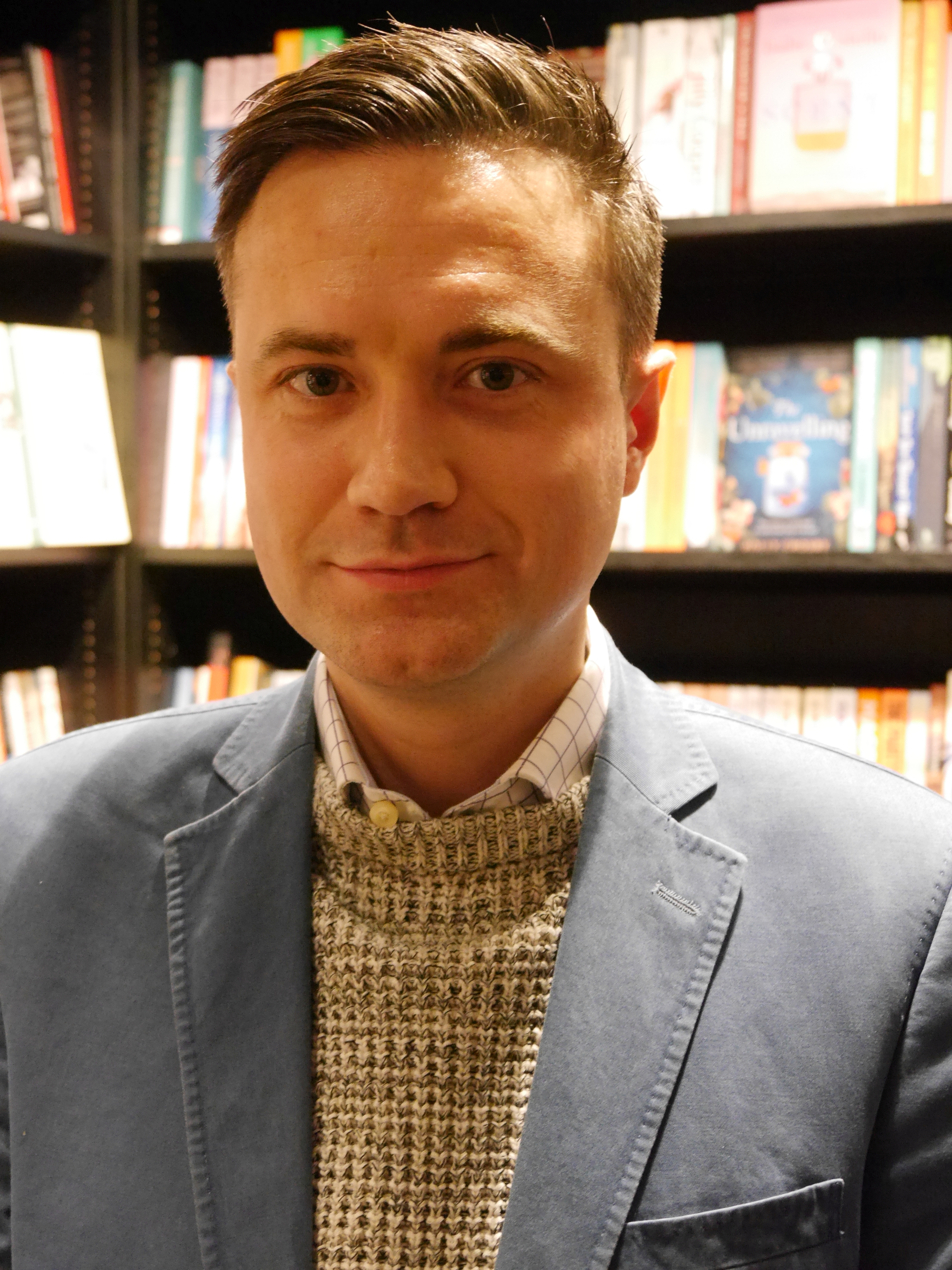
Cahill in 2022

James Cahill is a British art critic, academic, and author.

== Early life ==
Cahill was born in London. He earned a degree in Classics and English at Magdalen College, Oxford, followed by a master's degree in Contemporary Art from the Courtauld Institute. In 2017, he completed a PhD in Classics at Cambridge University. He is a Leverhulme Early Career Fellow at King's College London.

== Career ==
He has written for publications including Apollo, the Burlington Magazine, London Review of Books and Times Literary Supplement.

In 2022, his debut novel, Tiepolo Blue, was published. The Guardian called it "a bold debut of psychosexual awakening".

In April 2026, he was a guest on the Off the Shelf podcast.

== Publications ==
- Flying Too Close to the Sun, Phaidon Press, 2018
- The Classical Now, Elephant Publishing, 2018, with Michael Squire and Ruth Allen
- Tiepolo Blue, Sceptre, 2022
- The Violet Hour, Sceptre, 2025
- The Beverley Hills Housewife, Thames and Hudson, 2026
