= James F. Cahill =

American scuba diving pioneer (1926–2008)

James F. Cahill (1926 – February 28, 2008) was one of the pioneers of scuba diving, in essence helping to create the sport and industry.

Cahill was the first man to scuba dive in New England waters, one of the first UDTs and a co-founder of the National Association of Underwater Instructors (NAUI) according to published accounts. One account stated, "Cousteau invented (scuba diving), but Cahill introduced it to the United States."

== Career ==
Cahill served as a Lieutenant in the United States Navy in both World War II and the Korean War, and joined one of the first classes of the U.S. Underwater Demolition Team, code-named the "Amphibious Rogers", which preceded the formation of the Navy SEALs. He served as head of Boston Harbor security for the U.S. Navy. At the end of his active naval career, Cahill transferred to the Virgin Islands to participate in the filming of the motion picture "Frogmen" and took an active lead in developing the commercial and recreational scuba diving industry. Cahill is widely credited as being the first person to scuba dive in New England waters, and possibly on the entire US Eastern seaboard.

In the 1950s, Cahill founded the Hui Kai scuba training camp on Children's Island in Salem, MA along with his business partner Buster Crabbe, the then well-known original Tarzan actor. He also served as a consultant to the actor Lloyd Bridges during the popular television series of the late 1950s, "Sea Hunt." Cahill then founded and served as the president of New England Divers, Inc., headquartered in Beverly, MA which became the nation's first and largest chain of commercial scuba diving stores and training centers. Cahill expanded New England Divers' operations to locations throughout the United States.

As a pioneer of scuba diving, he assisted many state and local police departments, as well as the U.S. Navy, U.S. Coast Guard and Air Force in early underwater investigations, rescue missions and training sessions, many of which received broad media coverage. One case that received headlines at the time, was the Clark murder case, where Cahill recovered the murder weapon that had been discarded in the Merrimack river. The Navy also hired Cahill to photograph the Texas Towers 100 miles (160 km) off the Atlantic Coast—and he was placed in charge of the recovery mission for the Texas Tower 4 collapse, 200 feet (60 m) below sea level, coordinating both Navy and New England Divers personnel in the mission. Cahill and his team made more than 25 dives to 200 feet for the mission.

Cahill was also active in promoting scuba diving, serving as a member of the founding board of directors of the National Association of Underwater Instructors (NAUI) along with Jacques Cousteau. He also served as Chairman of the Massachusetts Governor's Committee to study scuba diving; served as a member of the Massachusetts Governors Marine Fisheries Advisory Commission; and as a member of the Massachusetts Governors Civil Defense Advisory Commission. In 2003, the industry acknowledged Cahill's early leadership when the Academy of Underwater Arts and Sciences presented him with the NOGI Award for Science. This award, which was first presented in 1960, is voted on solely by the surviving prior recipients. It was presented to Cahill for his reputation as a leader and innovator within the scuba industry.

Cahill was also Harbormaster for the City of Salem from 1981 to 1991, and the main subject of the book, Diary of the Depths.
