= Michael Aw =

Singaporean photographer

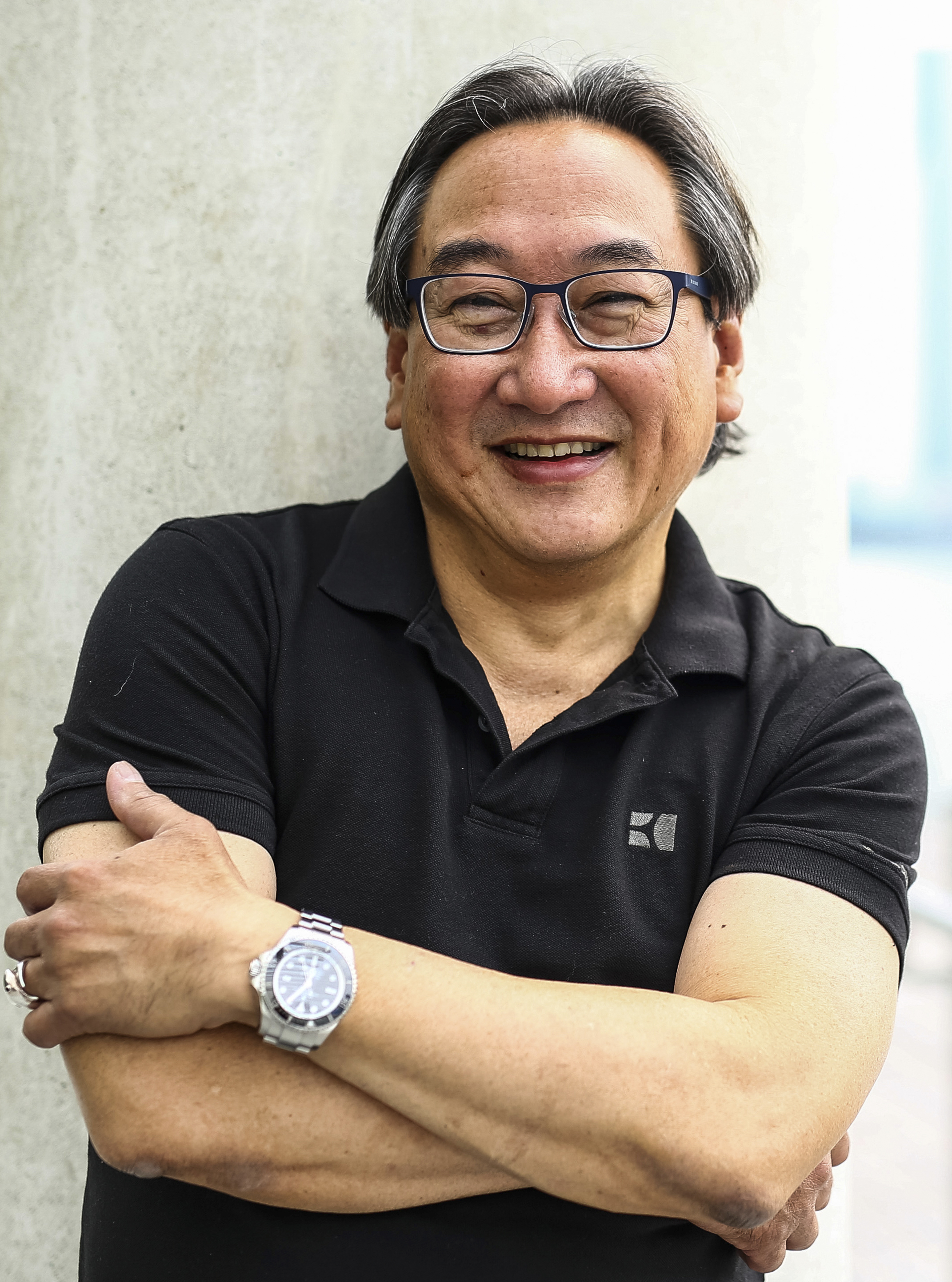
- Born: Michael Aw; Singapore
- Citizenship: Singaporean
- Occupation(s): Photographer, author, explorer
- Years active: 1991– present
- Known for: Ocean Conservation and underwater photography

Michael Aw is a Singaporean marine photographer and author based in Sydney, Australia.

Aw's professional career is in advertising and marketing working mainly in mainstream advertising agencies based in Australia, the US, and Singapore. He quit in 1995 to shoot professionally focusing mainly on ocean wildlife. Aw is a fellow of the Explorer Club NY and he also a Senior Fellow of the International League of Conservation Photographers.

In 1999, 2005, 2006 and 2015, Aw was awarded in the underwater category of NHM Wildlife Photographer of the Year. He also won the Gold diver awards for the slide show and portfolios categories at the World Festival of Underwater Pictures 2010 held at France.

== See also ==
- Nature photography
- Conservation photography
