= Dick Rutkowski =

American pioneer in hyperbaric and diving medicine

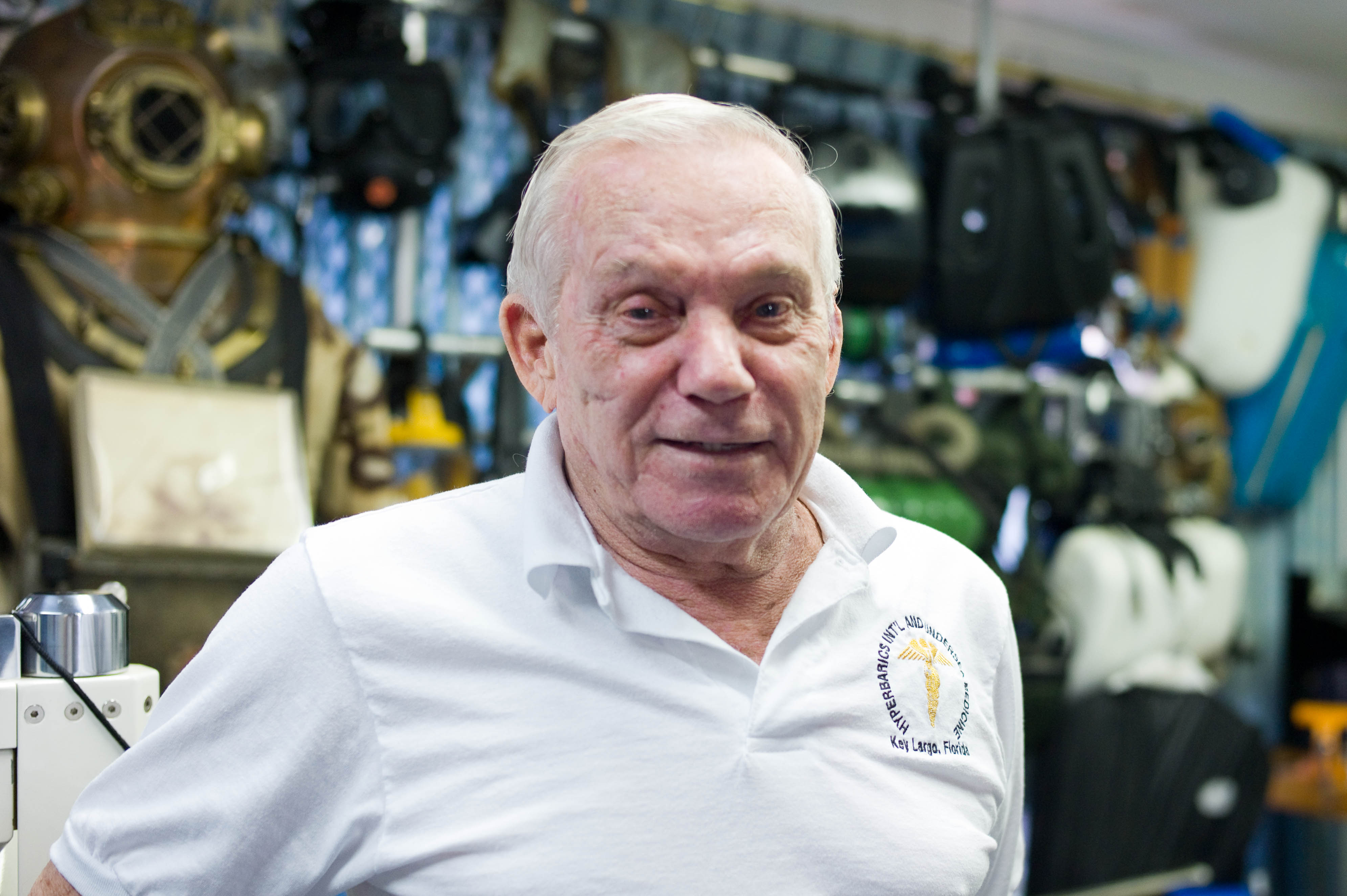
Dick Rutkowski in 2011

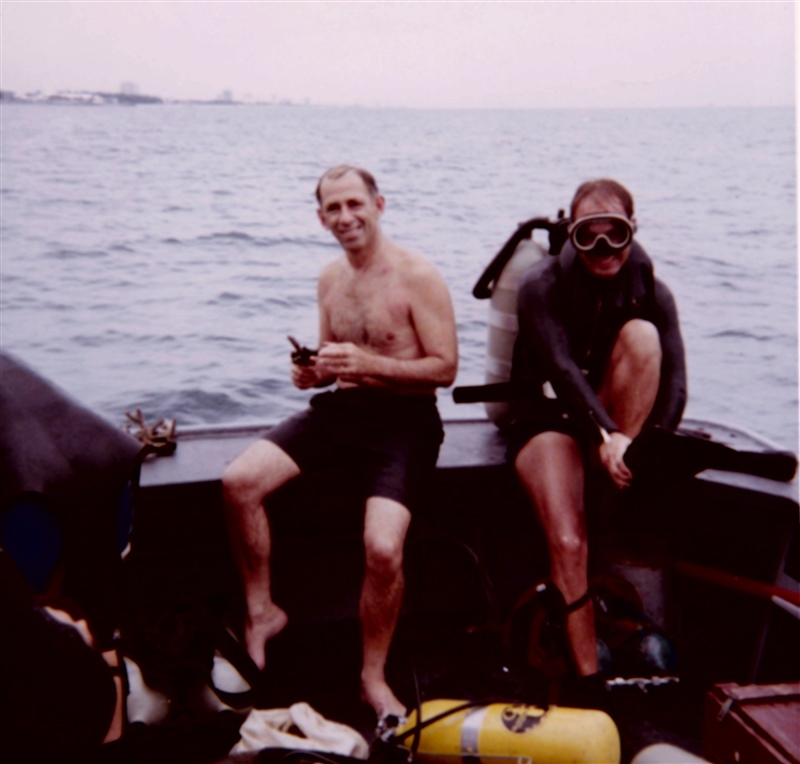
Two scuba divers, Harris B. Stewart and Dick Rutkowski, during NOAA's Project FLARE, an early research project into saturation diving

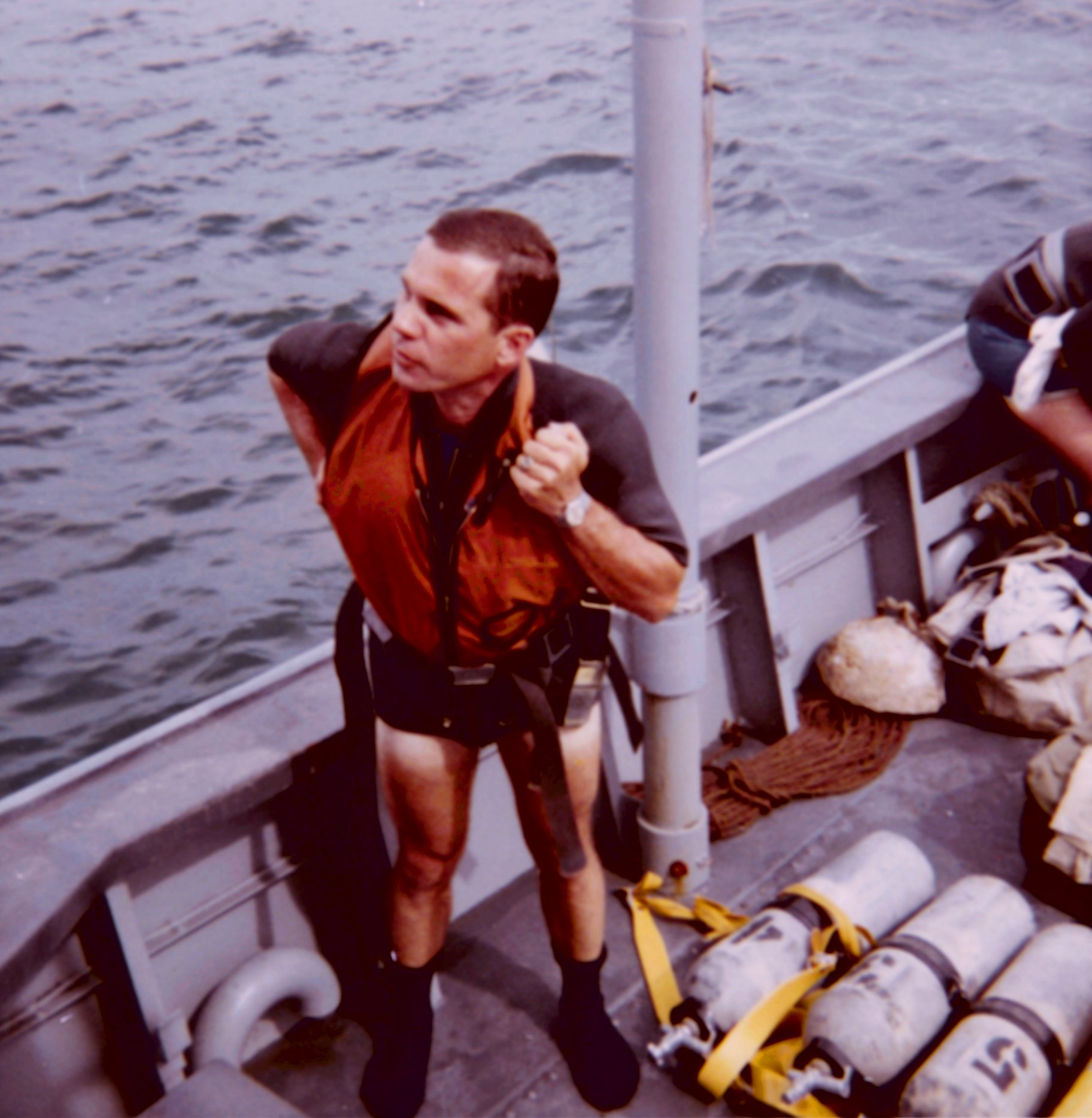
Dick Rutkowski donning scuba gear for FLARE

Richard Rutkowski is a pioneer in the fields of hyperbaric medicine, diving medicine and diver training, especially in relation to the use of breathing gases.

== Background ==
Rutkowski joined the US government service in 1950 and served during the Korean War. As a government civilian he served until 1970 when NOAA was established. He worked at NOAA from 1970 until 1985 as Deputy Diving Coordinator, Director of the NOAA Miami Hyperbaric Facility and Director of NOAA Diver Training. While at NOAA he founded the NOAA Diving/Hyperbaric Training and Diver Treatment Facility in 1973, and served as a director until 1985. He also served as co-director for the Physician's Diving and Hyperbaric Medical Training Program. During this time, hundreds of physicians have completed this program and are presently serving as directors and/or physicians for major hyperbaric facilities in the US and abroad.

Rutkowski is a NOAA aquanaut, having undergone saturation many times.

After retiring from NOAA, Rutkowski formed Hyperbaric International, Inc. He is also past president of the Undersea and Hyperbaric Medical Society, Gulf Coast Chapter.

In the 1970s Rutkowski taught the first diving emergency and accident management courses, including stressing the importance of oxygen use at the dive site by non-professionals. In 1978, he wrote and published the first diving accident management manual, setting the Divers Alert Network standard.

In 1985, Rutkowski began the introduction and popularization of nitrox use within the recreational diving community. This opened up some controversy between divers and the scientific community at the time. Rutkowski founded several organizations to focus on diver training and safety including American Nitrox Divers International (ANDI), the International Association of Nitrox Divers (IAND) - which later became known as the International Association of Nitrox and Technical Divers (IANTD) - and the Undersea Research Foundation (URF).

According to a March 2004 edition of Rodale's Scuba Diving magazine, "In the process of overcoming the negative hype surrounding oxygen-enriched air, he also gave us one of his other significant contributions to diving—a now famous quote—"Science Always Wins Over Bullshit."

His publications include Instructor/Student Guide for the Use of Nitrogen-Oxygen Mixtures as a Divers' Breathing Gas, The Complete Guide to Nitrox Diving, Introduction to Nitrox Diving, Instructor/Student Guide for the Use of Breathing Gases During Hyperbaric Exposures, and Mixing/Blending for Nitrox and Trimix. He has also been a contributor and editor of the NOAA Diving Manual and training films. He currently teaches a course titled "Advanced Diving / Hyperbaric Medical Team Training Program with Chamber Operations", which takes place monthly in Key Largo, FL.

Mr Rutkowski, known to most as "Hyper-Dick", is known for holding court most afternoons from a table at Sharkeys in the Port Largo subdivision, an area of Key Largo. Rutkowski in 2016 moved his Hyperbarics International operation and gear collection to an office complex at mile marker 98.8 in Key Largo.

== Honors ==
Honors and awards that Dick Rutkowski has received include:

- having a glacier in Antarctica named after him in 1976 by the US Board of Geographic Names
- the 1976 NOAA Public Service Award
- nomination for the 1976 Dade County (Florida) Outstanding Citizen Award
- National Association of Underwater Instructors Outstanding Service Award: 1977
- National Association of Underwater Instructors Continuing Outstanding Service Award: 1982
- National Fellow of the Explorers Club
- DEMA Reaching Out Award: 2012
- International Scuba Diving Hall of Fame: 2018.
- NOGI Award 2025 for his distinguished service
