= Stephen Frink =

Underwater photographer and publisher

Stephen Frink (born 1949) is a prolific underwater photographer, wildlife photographer, photo journalist, editor and publisher. Frink has contributed to Skin Diver magazine and Scuba Diving magazine. He is currently the publisher of Alert Diver magazine, an upscale quarterly publication for the Divers Alert Network.

== Early life ==
Frink was born in Iowa and moved to Illinois in his youth. He was a competitive swimmer in his youth. He moved to Key Largo, Florida in 1978.

== Career ==
In Key Largo, he maintains a small studio for underwater photo services, as well as camera rentals, film processing, and dive tours. Frink has his own stock photo agency, Stephen Frink Collection.

Frink has been commissioned by commercial clients including Oceanic, Canon, Nikon, American Express, Rolex, and Victoria's Secret. In March 2020 he was named Photographer of the Week by Dive Photo Guide. He is a "Canon Explorer of Light," and the only marine photographer within this select group of professionals. His work has appeared on the cover of Newsweek magazine and is displayed on the walls of Murray Nelson Government & Cultural Center in Florida.

In 2011, he went on an expedition for oceanic whitetip sharks with fellow wildlife photographers Stuart Cove and Marko Dimitrijevic. Frink and Dimitrijevic's photos from several shark expeditions have been awarded prizes, including part of Alert Diver's Ocean Views Highly Honored Gallery in 2017. In 2016, he was awarded the Distinguished NOGI award for art by the Academy of Underwater Arts and Science.

He is often cited as one of the most frequently published underwater photographers in the world.

== Personal life ==
He has a second home in Rougemont, North Carolina.
