= Stan Waterman =

American cinematographer and underwater film producer (1923–2023)

- Born: Stanton Arthur Waterman; April 5, 1923
- Died: August 10, 2023 (aged 100)
- Occupations: Cinematographer; Film producer
- Notable work: Blue Water, White Death

Stanton Arthur Waterman (April 5, 1923 – August 10, 2023) was an American cinematographer and underwater film producer who was a five-time Emmy Award winner.

== Life and career ==
After returning home from service in the US Navy during World War II, he became the first resident of Maine to purchase an aqualung, designed by Jacques Cousteau.

Waterman graduated from Dartmouth College, where he studied with Robert Frost, in 1946 with a degree in English. He began his SCUBA diving career in the Bahamas where he owned and operated a diving charter business from 1954 until 1958. His big break came in 1965 when he filmed a year-long family trip to Tahiti. National Geographic purchased the rights to the work and showed it on television. He was a producer and photographer on the 1971 film Blue Water, White Death which was the first cinematic filming of the great white shark.

Waterman was the subject of a Discovery Channel biographical special titled The Man Who Loves Sharks. Working with his son, he won the first father and son Emmy for the National Geographic Explorer production Dancing With Stingrays. His television credits include The American Sportsman (1965), The Bermuda Depths (1978), and The Explorers (1973) and film credits include The Deep (1977) and Jaws of Death (1977).

Waterman won five Emmy Awards for his work on underwater films and TV programs.

In 2005, Waterman published Sea Salt: Memories and Essays, with forewords by Peter Benchley and Howard Hall. He also wrote essays for Ocean Realm magazine. In 2013, Waterman took his last dive in the Cayman Islands at the age of 90. He died on August 10, 2023, at the age of 100.

== See also ==
- Hans Hass Award – Award in recognition of contribution made to the advancement of knowledge of the ocean
