= Robert F. Dill =

American marine geologist

- Known for: stromatolites and submarine canyons
- Scientific career
- Fields: Geology, Oceanography, Marine ecology

Robert F. Dill (1927 – 2004) (Robert Floyd Dill or Bob Dill) was a marine geologist. He is perhaps best known for his studies on stromatolites, the submarine canyons in California and his collaboration with Jacques Cousteau.

== Selected publications ==
- Dill, R. F., Shinn, E. A., Jones, A. T., Kelly, K., & Steinen, R. P. (1986). Giant subtidal stromatolites forming in normal salinity waters, Nature 324, November 55-58
- Dill, Robert F. (1964) "Sedimentation and erosion in Scripps submarine canyon head." Papers in Marine Geology23-41.
