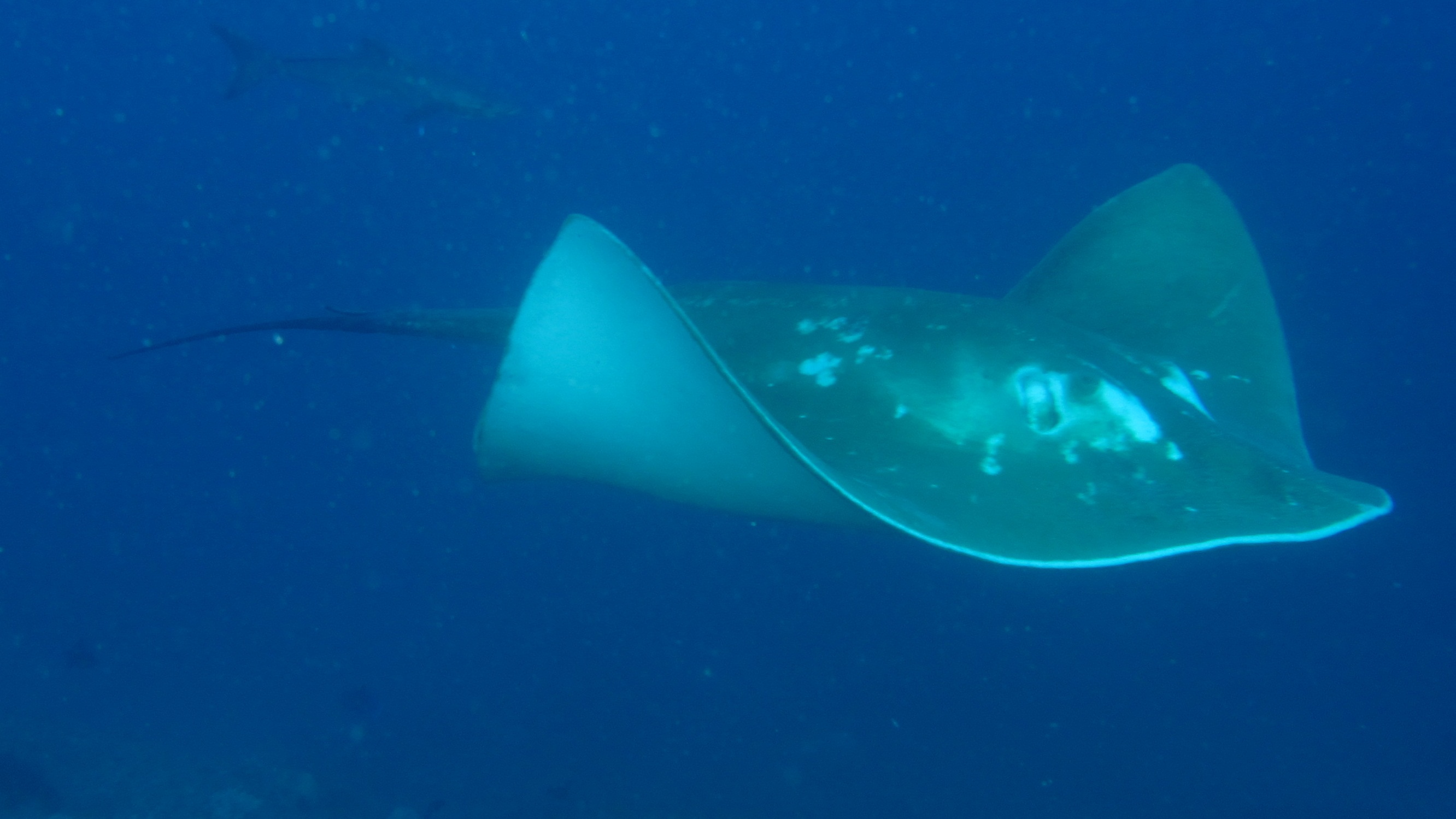

Conservation status
- Data Deficient (IUCN 3.1)

Scientific classification
- Kingdom: Animalia
- Phylum: Chordata
- Class: Chondrichthyes
- Subclass: Elasmobranchii
- Order: Myliobatiformes
- Family: Dasyatidae
- Genus: Megatrygon; Last, Naylor & Manjaji-Matsumoto, 2016
- Species: M. microps

Binomial name
- Megatrygon microps (Annandale, 1908)

Synonyms
- Trygon microps Annandale, 1908

= Smalleye stingray =

Species of cartilaginous fish

The smalleye stingray (Megatrygon microps) is a large species of stingray in the family Dasyatidae, measuring up to 2.2 m (7.2 ft) across. Rare but widely distributed, it is found in the Indo-Pacific from Mozambique to India to northern Australia. This species may be semi-pelagic in nature, inhabiting both deeper waters and shallow coastal reefs and estuaries. It is characterized by a diamond-shaped pectoral fin disc much wider than long, a tail that is broad and flattened in front of the spine but whip-like behind, and large white spots over its back.

The very wide shape of the smalleye stingray differs from that of most other members of its family, and may reflect a mode of swimming similar to other rays such as manta rays. This species is aplacental viviparous, with litter sizes perhaps as small as one pup. A handful of smalleye stingrays are caught incidentally by commercial fisheries across its range. At present there is insufficient data for the International Union for Conservation of Nature (IUCN) to determine its conservation status beyond Data Deficient.

== Taxonomy ==
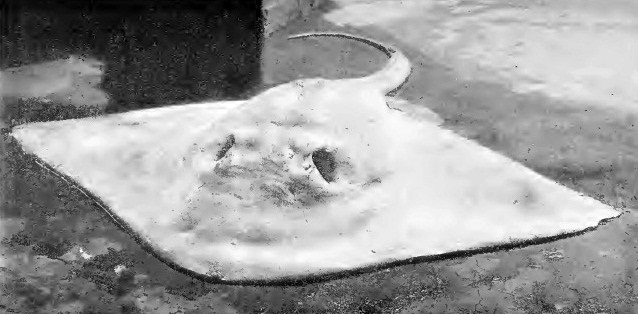
The type specimen of the smalleye stingray; note the distinctive shape.

In 1908, Scottish zoologist Nelson Annandale described the smalleye stingray as Trygon microps, in the second volume of Records of the Indian Museum. He based his account on a large specimen collected from a depth of 31 m (102 ft) in the Bay of Bengal, near Chittagong, Bangladesh. Later authors synonymized the genus Trygon with Dasyatis, although molecular data may suggest it is actually more closely related to the Neotropical stingrays (Potamotrygonidae) and round rays (Urotrygonidae). Megatrygon has since been created and assigned as the genus for this species,

== Distribution and habitat ==
The smalleye stingray is widely but possibly discontinuously distributed in the Indian and Pacific Oceans, having been first tagged in Tofo in Mozambique, and reported in Malé in the Maldives, the coasts of India and Bangladesh, the Gulf of Thailand, Malaysia and Indonesia, the Arafura Sea, and possibly the Philippines. This species has been reported from inshore habitats and river mouths, including the Ganges River estuary, as well as from deeper water; it is uncertain which is its preferred habitat. At Tofo, smalleye stingrays have been seen swimming over reefs at a depth of 15–25 m (49–82 ft), where the water temperature is 23–28 °C (73–82 °F). Although it had been presumed to be bottom-dwelling, these observations of individuals in mid-water suggest that the smalleye stingray may in fact be semi-pelagic in nature.

== Description ==
The smalleye stingray has a distinctive shape among its family: the pectoral fin disc is more than 1.4 times wider than long, with the outer corners forming obtuse angles. The anterior margins of the disc are sinuous and converge on a rounded snout with a slightly projecting tip. The eyes are small and immediately followed by a pair of much larger spiracles. The mouth is wide and contains five papillae across the floor. The tail is not quite as long as the disc, and is broad and flattened from its base to the stinging spine. The tail spine of one specimen examined measured 9.1 cm (3.6 in) long and bore 75 serrations. After the spine, the tail abruptly becomes thin and cylindrical, with a low, thick fin fold running underneath.

The upper surface of the disc is covered by many large dermal denticles with star-shaped bases, concentrated on the snout. This ray is brown to reddish brown above, darkening towards the tip of the tail, and white below, becoming slightly dusky at the fin margins and on the tail. The dorsal surface bears characteristic large white spots beside the eyes, around the disc center, and in a row on either side about two-thirds of the way to the pectoral fin tips. There is also a row of small white spots on either side of the tail base. One of the largest stingray species, the smalleye stingray can reach a disc width of 2.2 m (7.2 ft) and a total length of 3.2 m (10 ft).

== Biology and ecology ==
The disc shape of the smalleye stingray suggests that it may swim in a fashion unlike other stingrays and more akin to other rays with very broad pectoral fin discs (such as butterfly or manta rays), i.e., flapping its pectoral fins up and down rather than undulating the pectoral fin margins; this species would thus represent a case of convergent evolution with those ray families. Off Tofo, most individuals are accompanied by multiple cobia (Rachycentron canadum). A known parasite of this species is the tapeworm Oncomegoides celatus, which infests the spiral valve intestine. As with other stingrays, the smalleye stingray is aplacental viviparous with the developing embryos being sustained by yolk and later histotroph ("uterine milk") secreted by the mother. There is a record of a female gestating a single late-term fetus, which exhibited the same spotted color pattern as the adult. Newborn rays likely measure 31–33 cm (12–13 in) across.

== Human interactions ==
The smalleye stingray appears to be very rare across much of its range, perhaps explained by its possible semi-pelagic habits. It is only known to be encountered with any regularity at the reefs off Tofo Beach, where in 2009 the first living individual was recorded underwater by a BBC film crew working with Andrea Marshall and the Marine Megafauna Foundation (MMF). An MMF team first successfully tagged a specimen for tracking in 2023.

This species is an occasional incidental catch of demersal longline, bottom trawl, trammel net, and seine net fisheries throughout its range. There is also a record of one being speared by artisanal fishers in Mozambique. The meat, cartilage, and possibly skin are of value. The International Union for Conservation of Nature (IUCN) does not yet have enough information to assess the smalleye stingray beyond Data Deficient. Intensive fishing occurs in much of this ray's range and its large size may render it vulnerable, though if it favors deeper water that may confer some protection.
