= Women Divers Hall of Fame =

International honor society

- Women Divers Hall of Fame
- Abbreviation: WDHOF
- Legal status: Nonprofit tax-exempt 501C(3)
- Purpose: To honor the accomplishments of women divers
- Region served: International
- Fields: Women in underwater diving
- Members: 263 (2025)
- President: Robin Parish
- Chair: Mary Connelly
- Vice President: Heather Armstrong
- Secretary: Dawn Kernagis
- Website: https://www.wdhof.org

The Women Divers Hall of Fame (WDHOF) is an international honor society. Its purpose is to honor the accomplishments of women divers, and their contributions to various fields of underwater diving.

== History ==
The WDHOF was founded in 1999 by a group of people and organizations, including the Underwater Society of America. 72 women were inducted in 2000, followed by 26 new members the next year. It was the first organization with the purpose of drawing attention to and supporting women divers.

Full membership is restricted to nominees who have been found to meet the WDHOF's criteria, which include being an underwater diver and having contributed to diving in ways recognised as being significant.

== Scholarships and grants ==
The WDHOF awards many scholarships and training grants to support women of "all ages who are pursuing careers involving diving" including the J. Berman Memorial Grant for Sea Turtle Conservation, the Sherry Reed Memorial Undergraduate Marine Conservation Scholarship, the Laurel Clark Sea to Space Physiology Research Grant and the Amelia Behrens-Furniss Memorial Hardhat Dive Training Grant.

== Members ==
As of 2025, there are 263 members. They include:

Name	Dates	Induction	Details
Pamela Balash-Webber	1953-2020	2022	Co-founder of the Virgin Islands Diving Association, PADI course director, and promoter of ocean conservation
Carole Baldwin		2022	Scientist, author, and educator. An authority on marine biology, especially tropical-marine fishes, conservation and sustainable seafood
Sally Bauer		2011	Diving museum founder and historian, aquaculturist, author, and public speaker
Patricia Beddows		2021	Educator, hydrogeologist, expert in karst landscapes and caves
Amelia Behrens-Furniss	1895-1970	2012	Pioneering American deep sea diver
Wendy Benchley		2015	Marine conservation leader, governmental policy advocate, and spokesperson on shark conservation
Bette Bolivar	1962-	2005	US Navy Diving and Salvage Officer; commanding Officer of USS Salvor, and of the Navy Mobile Diving and Salvage Unit
Mary Bonnin		2001	First woman US Navy Master Diver; US Navy diving instructor; naval diving safety advocate
Cathy Church	1945-	2000	American marine biologist, SCUBA diver, underwater photographer and educator
Eugenie Clark	1922-2015	2022	An American ichthyologist known for both her research on shark behaviour and her study of fish in the order Tetraodontiformes; a pioneer in the field of scuba diving for research purposes
Laurel B. Clark	1961-2003	2003	Clark did active duty training with the Diving Medicine Department at the United States Navy Experimental Diving Unit; completed Navy undersea medical officer training at the Naval Undersea Medical Institute in Groton, Connecticut, and diving medical officer training at the Naval Diving and Salvage Training Center; she dove with Navy divers and Naval Special Warfare Unit Two SEALs and performed many medical evacuations from US submarines; designated as a Naval Submarine Medical Officer and Diving Medical Officer
Céline Cousteau	1972-	2011	
Annie Crawley	1968-	2010	American underwater photographer, filmmaker, speaker, educator, and ocean advocate. In 2007, she founded Dive Into Your Imagination, a multimedia ocean inspiration, entertainment, and education series for youth.
Mandy-Rae Cruickshank	1974-	2009	Canadian World champion free-diver and record-holder
Sylvia Earle	1935-	2000	Oceanographer and marine biologist (former Chief Scientist at NOAA), author and consultant
Dottie Frazier	1922-2022	2000	American diver and dive shop owner; the first female scuba instructor and the first female dive shop owner.
Honor Frost	1917-2010	2019	Pioneer in the field of underwater archaeology, who led Mediterranean archaeological investigations and was noted for her typology of stone anchors and skills in archaeological illustration
Szilvia Gogh		2016	Hungarian diver and stunt performer, the youngest female PADI Course Director
Lotte Hass	1928-2015	2000	Austrian underwater diver, model and actress
Hillary Hauser	1944-	2000	American photojournalist and environmental activist with a focus on the oceans — underwater diving adventure, politics, and conservation
Mehgan Heaney-Grier	1977-	2000	American champion free-diver
Jill Heinerth	1965-	2000	Canadian cave diver, underwater explorer, writer, photographer and film-maker
Denise Herzing		2021	Founder and Research Director of the Wild Dolphin Project
Lauren Hutton	1943-	2007	Conservationist and scuba advocate
Darlene Iskra	1952-	2008	US Navy diving and salvage officer, first woman to command a commissioned US Navy ship, public speaker, and author
Karen Kohanowich		2001	Retired U.S. Naval officer and ocean research and technology program manager for the National Oceanic and Atmospheric Administration (NOAA)'s Office of Ocean Exploration and Research (OER)
Gloria Macapagal-Arroyo		2007	
Dení Ramírez Macías	1978-	2021	Mexican marine biologist ocean scientist, and conservationist, and director of Whale Shark México (Tiburon Ballena Mexico)
Andrea Marshall		2023	marine biologist known for wildlife conservation and research on large marine animals like manta rays & whale sharks; co-founder and a principal scientist of the Marine Megafauna Foundation
Simone Melchior-Cousteau	1919-1990	2017	First woman scuba diver and aquanaut; wife and business partner of undersea explorer Jacques-Yves Cousteau
Audrey Mestre	1974-2002	2002	French world record-setting freediver
Zale Parry	1933-	2000	American pioneer scuba diver, underwater photographer and actress
Penelope Powell	1904-1965	2023	Pioneering cave diver in 1935
Lesley Rochat		2010	South African marine and shark conservationist, campaigner, wildlife filmmaker, underwater photographer, environmental writer, author, speaker and activist. She founded the non-profit organisation AfriOceans Conservation Alliance
Dee Scarr		2000	American environmentalist, marine naturalist, and scuba diver
Claudia Serpieri		2002	Italian world-record technical diver and instructor
Heidemarie Stefanyshyn-Piper	1963-	2007	American salvage officer. Projects include de-stranding the tanker Exxon Houston off the coast of Barbers Point, on the island of Oahu, Hawaii, and developing the plan for the Peruvian Navy salvage of the Peruvian submarine
Tanya Streeter	1973-	2000	British-Caymanian-American world champion freediver
Kathryn Sullivan	1951-	2008	American, first woman to dive into the Challenger Deep in the Mariana Trench
Valerie Taylor	1935-	2000	Australian diver, underwater photographer and film maker
Donna Tobias	1952-2010	2001	United States Navy's first female deep sea diver
Ruth Turner	1914-2000	2001	Pioneering U.S. marine biologist and malacologist
Michele Westmorland		2011	American photographer, specializing in underwater photography
Susan Williams	1951-2018	2019	American marine biologist
Jill Yager		2000	American zoologist and cave diver
Cristina Zenato	1971-	2011	Shark protection consultant; TDI and NSS-CDS technical and full cave instructor; explorer, surveyor and mapper of cave systems; and ocean advocate
