= Sharkbook =

Shark photo identification database

- Legal status: nonprofit
- Parent organization: Marine Megafauna Foundation, WildMe
- Volunteers: 9445 citizen scientists, 313 researchers
- Website: https://www.sharkbook.ai
- Formerly called: whaleshark.org, wildbook for whale sharks

Sharkbook is a global database for identifying and tracking sharks, particularly whale sharks, using uploaded photos and videos.In addition to identifying and tracking sharks, the site allows people to "adopt a shark" and get updates on specific animals.

== Creation ==
Sharkbook is the result of collaboration between Simon J Pierce of the Marine Megafauna Foundation and Jason Holmberg of Wild Me. The software is Open Source and is now being used by other biology projects.

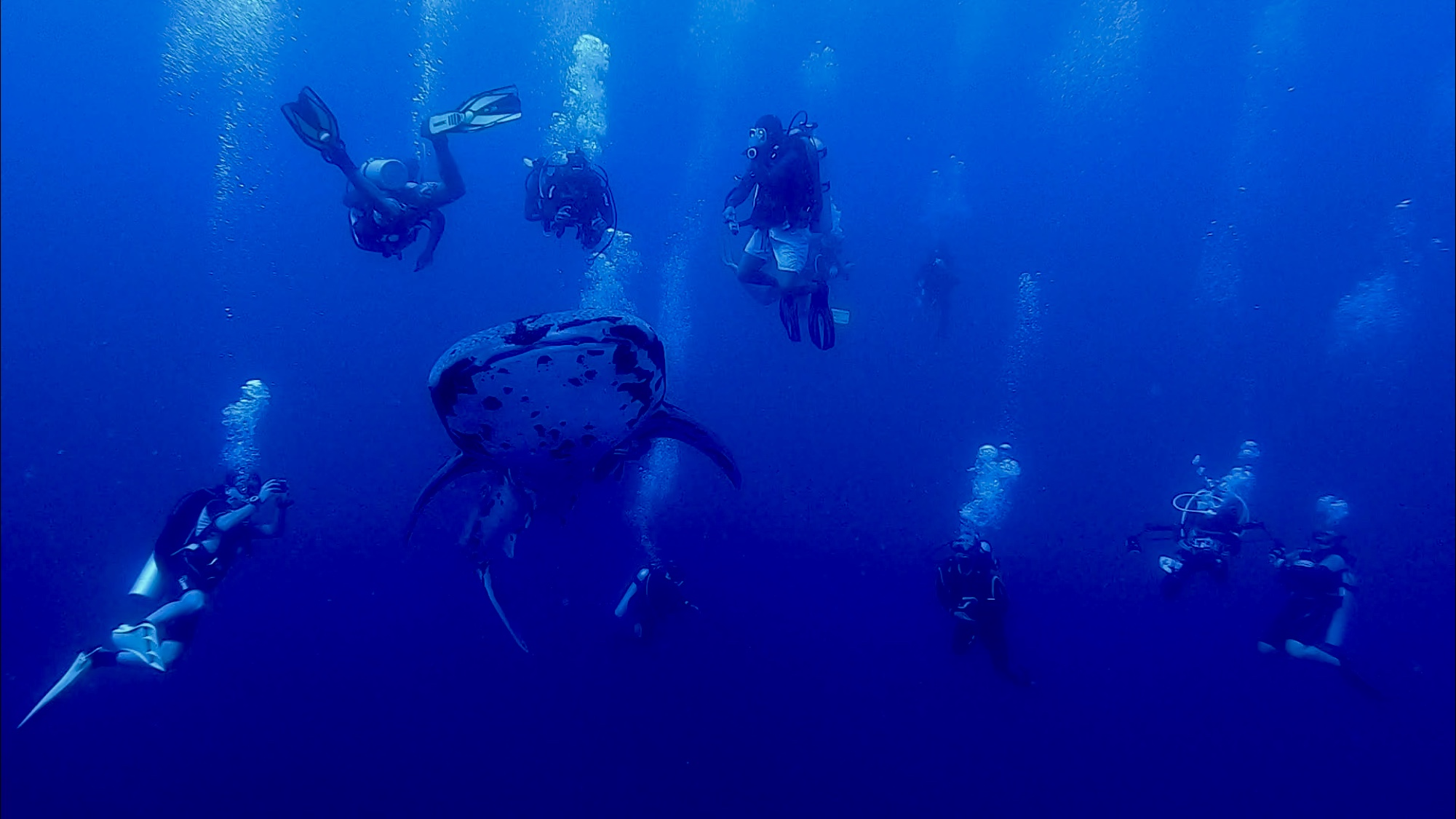
Whale shark with divers

== Identification of individual sharks ==
Whale sharks have unique spot patterning on their sides, similar to a human fingerprint, which allows for individual identification. Scuba diversAround the world can photograph sharks and upload their identification photographs to the Sharkbook website, supporting global research and conservation efforts. Additionally, the software automatically searches social media sites like YouTube and Instagram to look for images of whale sharks and adds them to the database.

Sharkbook software uses special pattern-matching software to identify the unique spots on each shark. This software and algorithms were originally adapted from NASA star tracking software used on the Hubble Space Telescope. This software uses a scale-invariant feature transform (SIFT) algorithm, which can cope with complications presented by highly variable spot patterns and low contrast photographs.

== Purpose ==
This citizen science tool is free to use by researchers worldwide. Sharkbook represents a global initiative to centralize shark sightings and facilitate research on these vulnerable species.

== See also ==
- Manta Matcher - For Manta Rays
- Flukebook - For whales and dolphins
