= Mancino =

Mancino is a surname of Italian origin. Notable people with the surname include:

- Nicola Mancino (born 1931), Italian politician
- Roberta Mancino (born 1980), Italian skydiver and model
- Thomas H. Mancino (born 1969), Military Officer and 22nd Adjutant General of Oklahoma
