= Amelia Behrens-Furniss =

Pioneering American deep-sea diver

- Behrens-Furniss from a 1943 newspaper
- Born: Amelia Bauer Florence Behrens; 6 July 1895; New Jersey, USA
- Died: 8 July 1970 (aged 75); Glendale, California, USA
- Other names: Amelia Florence Behrens; Amelia Florence Behrens Musser; Florence Amelia Musser; Amelia Florence Musser; Amelia Florence Furniss; Amelia Furniss
- Known for: Deep-sea diving
- Spouses: Guy Milton Musser (m. 1913; div. 1921) Lawrence Furniss (m. 1924; death 1969)
- Children: 5

Amelia Behrens-Furniss (6 July 1895 - 8 July 1970) was an American deep-sea diver. She was one of the first women to work on offshore oil rigs. In 1921 she set a new endurance record by spending three hours underwater, while recovering tools that had been dropped. She was inducted into the Women Divers Hall of Fame in 2012.

== Personal life ==
Amelia Bauer Florence Behrens was born to father, Captain Henry Behrens, from Denmark and mother, Amelia Miller, from New York. She had one sister, Dorothy. Behrens attended West Night High School, Cincinnati for stenography.

She married Guy Milton Musser (1898-1931) at the age of 17 on 21 March 1913 in Los Angeles, California. Musser was a professional deep-sea diver, working for Behrens’ father. They had two children, born in 1914 and 1915. In 1919 she was convicted of bigamy, after proposing to, and marrying John Carter in San Francisco on 24 July that year. As punishment, she was put on probation for a year and placed in the Salvation Army’s True Love Home (for unwed mothers, and the needy) in Los Angeles. Carter, for his part, was given an “indeterminate sentence, not to exceed ten years”. Behrens’ final words to Carter before he was taken away were “Be sure and cut that moustache off before I see you again.” In January 1920 Musser forgave her, after which she was “released from the True Love Home, in order that she might return to her husband and children.”

In 1921 Musser was charged with battery of Behrens and her father after an altercation at the “back of the Venice bathhouse”. She sued for divorce in August of the same year.

She married Englishman Lawrence Furniss (1884-1969), a veteran of WWI, on 19 December 1924 at Eagle Rock, Los Angeles. They had three children.

In 1928 she was made to pay $167 to a chiropractor for a bill which she initially refused to settle, claiming the doctor “pressed his hand affectionately” during one of her visits.”

== Diving career ==
Behrens’ father, Captain Henry Behrens, ran a commercial diving business and diving bell exhibition on Venice Pier, where he taught Behrens and her sister to dive. Before her marriage to Musser she was an exhibition diver.

In 1921, in order to salvage some tools which had been dropped, she made five 45-foot descents down an oil well through a 24” casing, over the course of three hours. The pipe was so narrow that she wasn't able to bend over to pick up the tools, so had to do everything “with her feet”. She became wedged on the final dive, but, by “staying calm and keeping her wits about her”, she managed to free herself. The dive set a new endurance record for the longest time spent under water by anyone. Some expressed doubts as to whether her feat was genuine. Rig and Reel magazine went so far as to ask her father to provide verification. He duly provided evidence and the magazine published that he had done so “to our satisfaction.” Captain Behrens went on to comment that “Amelia…is…perfectly fearless and has complete confidence in herself in whatever she does.”

On another dive she almost passed out when the crank operator, having had too much garlic over lunch, “leaned too close to the air supply”.

=== The Amelia Behrens-Furniss Memorial ===
The Amelia Behrens-Furniss Memorial Hardhat Diver Training Grant is funded by her family and awarded by the Women Divers Hall of Fame, to provide financial assistance to women divers who are interested in learning more about hardhat diving.

== WWII service ==
At the age of 47 Behrens-Furniss spent a year trying to enlist for war service before being accepted; being too old she was unable to join. The age of enlistment for women was raised in 1943, in part due to Behrens pleading directly with Eleanor Roosevelt and Oveta Culp Hobby about which Behrens-Furniss said “I sure worked hard enough for this. I wrote Mrs Roosevelt and Mrs Hobby both, asking them either to raise the age limit or to waive it in my case. I am certainly thrilled that they took me.”

She served as a nurse with the Women’s Army Corps (WAC) from October 1943 for the next six years. An article in Yank magazine read “Everybody in the Lawrence Furniss family except the cat is helping the war effort”, noting that even the family’s police dog Mickey was registered for service. Her husband was with the US Engineers, her daughter was also in the WAC, both sons and son-in-law were in the US Navy. Behrens was quoted as saying, “Why, even the dog was accepted to Dogs for Defense before I made the grade.” An accident meant she received a medical discharge in October 1949. She refused to accept a disability pension. Of her service she said, “I’ll treasure my WAC experience as long as I live.”

== Other activities ==
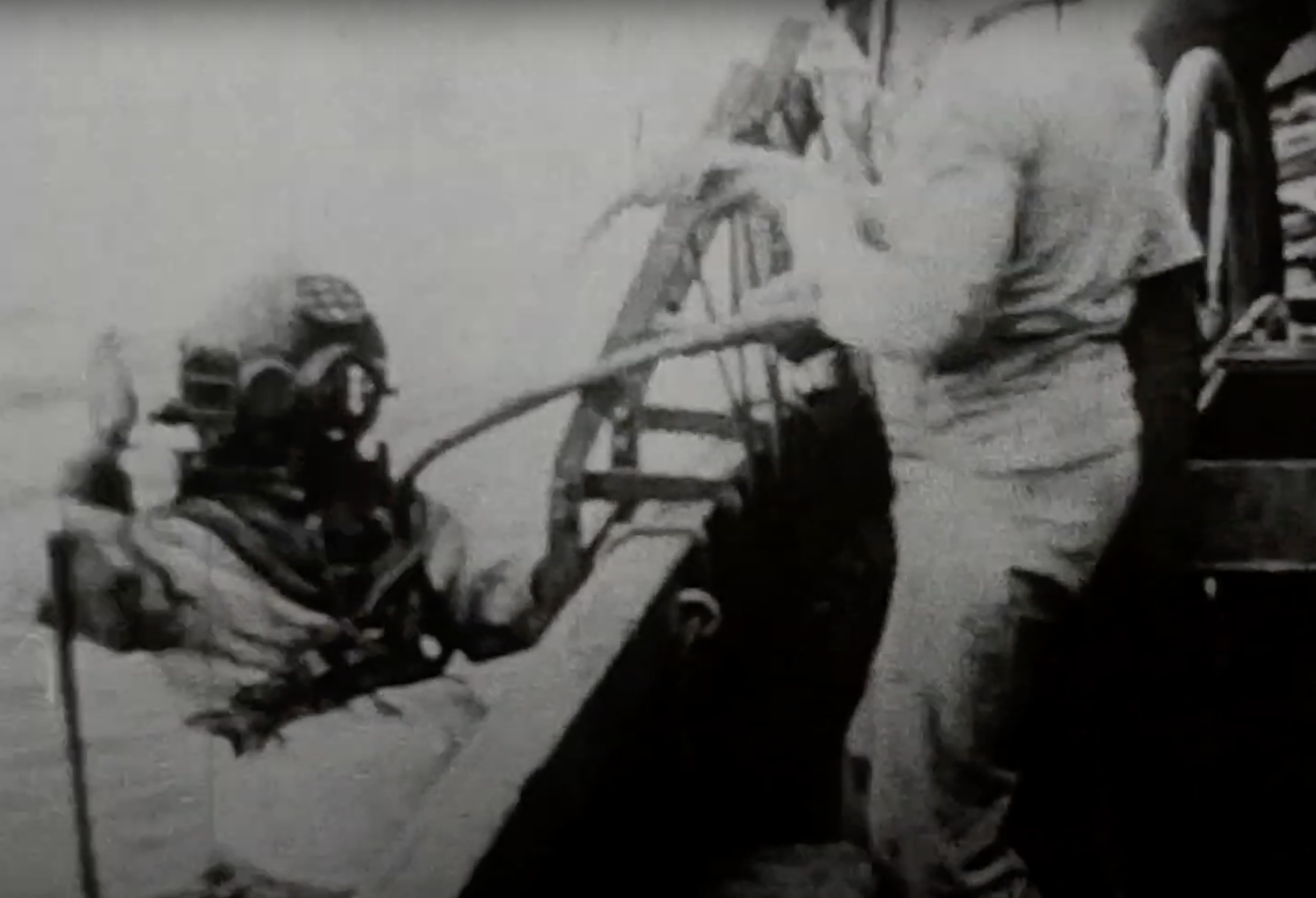
Film still of Behrens-Furniss appearing in The Perils of Pauline (1914)

Behrens was also something of a daredevil. She performed wing walking feats and worked as a stunt woman in early films, including Chapter 7 The Tragic Plunge in Perils of Pauline (1914).
