= Calzedonia Ocean Girls =

Reality TV series

- Genre: reality
- Presented by: Simone Annicchiarico
- Starring: Rachele Fogar; Eva Roqueta Vita; Giorgia Arosio; Sara Cardillo; Simona Sassone; Barbora Vesela; Jessica De Vincenzi; Simona Pastore; Ludovica Loda; Elisaveta "Lisa" Migatcheva
- Country of origin: Italy
- No. of seasons: 1
- No. of episodes: 6

Production
- Production location: Canary Islands

Original release
- Network: Sky Uno/Cielo

Calzedonia Ocean Girls was an Italian reality television series. The show, presented by Simone Annicchiarico, was broadcast on Sky Uno/Cielo in 2014.

== Contestants ==
Selected from over 2,000 girls. They are:

- Rachele Fogar (22 years, Milan)
- Eva Roqueta Vita (30 years, Spagna)
- Giorgia Arosio (21 years, Milan)
- Sara Cardillo (31 years, Benevento)
- Simona Sassone (39 years, Melfi)
- Barbora Vesela (28 years, Praga)
- Jessica De Vincenzi (27 years, Sant'Angelo Romano)
- Simona Pastore (29 years, Catania)
- Ludovica Loda (20 years, Gardone Val Trompia)
- Elisaveta "Lisa" Migatcheva (24 years, Kazan - Russia)

== Coaches ==
- Tanya Streeter (freediving)
- Anna Bader (diving)
- Gisela Pulido (Kiteboarding)
- Lea Peterson (motorcycle stunt-woman)
- Andrew Cotton (surfing)
- Roberta Mancino (skydiving)
