= Sherry Anne Reed =

American marine biologist

Sherry Anne Reed (February 2, 1959 – December 16, 2019) was an American marine biologist. She served at the Smithsonian Marine Station at Link Port for over 36 years as a research specialist, station manager, and dive safety officer. Reed is known as the first female scientific diving officer in the United States.

== Early life ==
Reed was born in 1959 in Bourne, Cape Cod, Massachusetts. She attended Wheaton College in Massachusetts, where she studied marine science.

In 1982, Reed graduated from Wheaton College in Massachusetts with a bachelor's degree in biology and started her first marine science career at the Smithsonian Museum of Natural History, where she assisted with curating the octopus and mollusk collections.

== Professional career ==
In 1983, Reed joined the Smithsonian Marine Station at Link Port in Florida as a marine biological research assistant. During her studies of the local marine organisms and ecosystem, two new marine species were found and named after her—Smithsoniarhynches sherryreedae, a new species of flatworm found in Indian River Lagoon, and Celleporaria sherryae, a new species of bryozoan found in the Gulf of Mexico.

Reed also served for many years as a dive safety officer for the Smithsonian Marine Station and the Caribbean Coral Research Ecosystem Program until she was promoted to station manager in 2015. She had supervised thousands of scientific research dives throughout Florida, Belize and the Caribbean. Over the years, she saved a dozen people and various animals from drowning, and a FPL lineman from electrocution. Besides a passionate scientific diver and officer, Reed was a licensed Coast Guard captain and a certified instructor of PADI scuba, CPR, first aid, and accident management.

Reed was a member of various professional organizations. She served on the Smithsonian's Diving Control Board and the Board of Directors of both the American Academy of Underwater Sciences. She became part of the Board of Directors of the Women Divers Hall of Fame (WDHOF) in 2002 and served as the secretary (2006–2011) and the vice-president (2011–2014).
