= Annie Crawley =

American underwater photographer (born 1968)

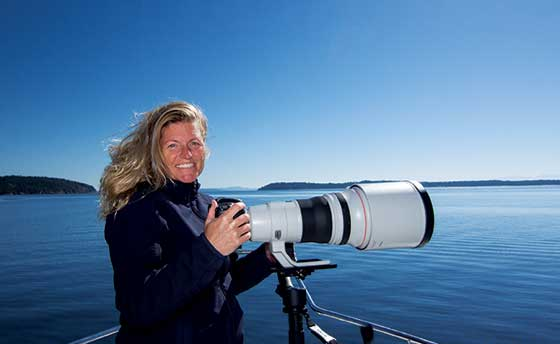
- Shooting images in the field
- Born: August 23, 1968 (age 58); Chicago, Illinois, U.S.
- Education: University of Illinois at Urbana–Champaign
- Awards: Women Divers Hall of Fame, Green Earth Book Award

Annie Crawley (born 1968) is an American underwater photographer, filmmaker, speaker, educator, and ocean advocate. In 2007, she founded Dive Into Your Imagination, a multimedia ocean inspiration, entertainment, and education series for youth. In 2010, she became a member of the Women Divers Hall of Fame. Crawley resides in Edmonds, Washington.

== Early life and education ==
Crawley was born in Chicago, Illinois in 1968 and received a Bachelor of Science from the University of Illinois at Urbana-Champaign.

== Work ==
In 2007, she wrote Ocean Life From A to Z, which was accompanied by a DVD, both of which are intended to teach children about both life in the ocean and scuba diving.

Crawley's film, Dive Into Your Imagination (2008), was well-reviewed by School Library Journal, who wrote that her "tour of the ocean and the facts about the animals is fabulous." rawley's Scuba Diving Camp. She has a series of "Learn to SCUBA dive" videos. Crawley also works as the director of Beach Camp at Sunset Bay and tries to instill the importance of ocean conservation with fun at the camp in Edmonds.

Her photographs for the 2014 book, Plastic Ahoy! by Patricia Newman, were called "captivating" by Library Media Connection. The book was based on the 2009 Scripps Environmental Accumulation of Plastics Expedition or SEAPLEX to the North Pacific Subtropical Gyre. The scientists on the expedition found that plastic was in nearly 10% of the fish they dissected. Based on their findings, fish in the gyre have eaten an estimated 12,000 to 14,000 tons of plastic.

In 2015, she received the Pacific Northwest Diver of the Year Award.

Crawley works with youth, teaching them about the harmfulness of marine debris and doing ocean clean-ups. She visits schools as a youth speaker and ocean educator.

In 2016 Crawley and her team launched 100 Schools 100 Days: Our Ocean and You campaign to bring the ocean to the greater Seattle area and inspire kids/teachers/families to understand the interconnections we have with the ocean while sharing with them the problems facing our ocean, particularly as it relates to plastics, and what they can do about it. The program's mission is to change the way the next generation views their relationship with the ocean and give them tools to protect the environment.

== DVDs and movies ==
- Visions of the Sea (2006 - producer)
- What Makes A Fish A Fish? (2007 - producer, actor)
- Dive Into California (2010 - producer, actor)
- Dive Into Diversity (2013 - producer, actor)
- Who Lives In The Sea? (2013 - producer, actor)
- Sharks & Rays (2013 - producer, actor)
- The Camera Coach: Your Guide To Creating Underwater Video (2009 - producer, actor)

== Accomplishments and honors ==
In 2015, the Nature Generation selected PlasticAhoy! for the Green Earth Book Award winner.

In March 2015, Crawley was chosen for the PNW Diver of the Year award.
