= Mary Bonnin =

United States Navy Master Chief, underwater diver

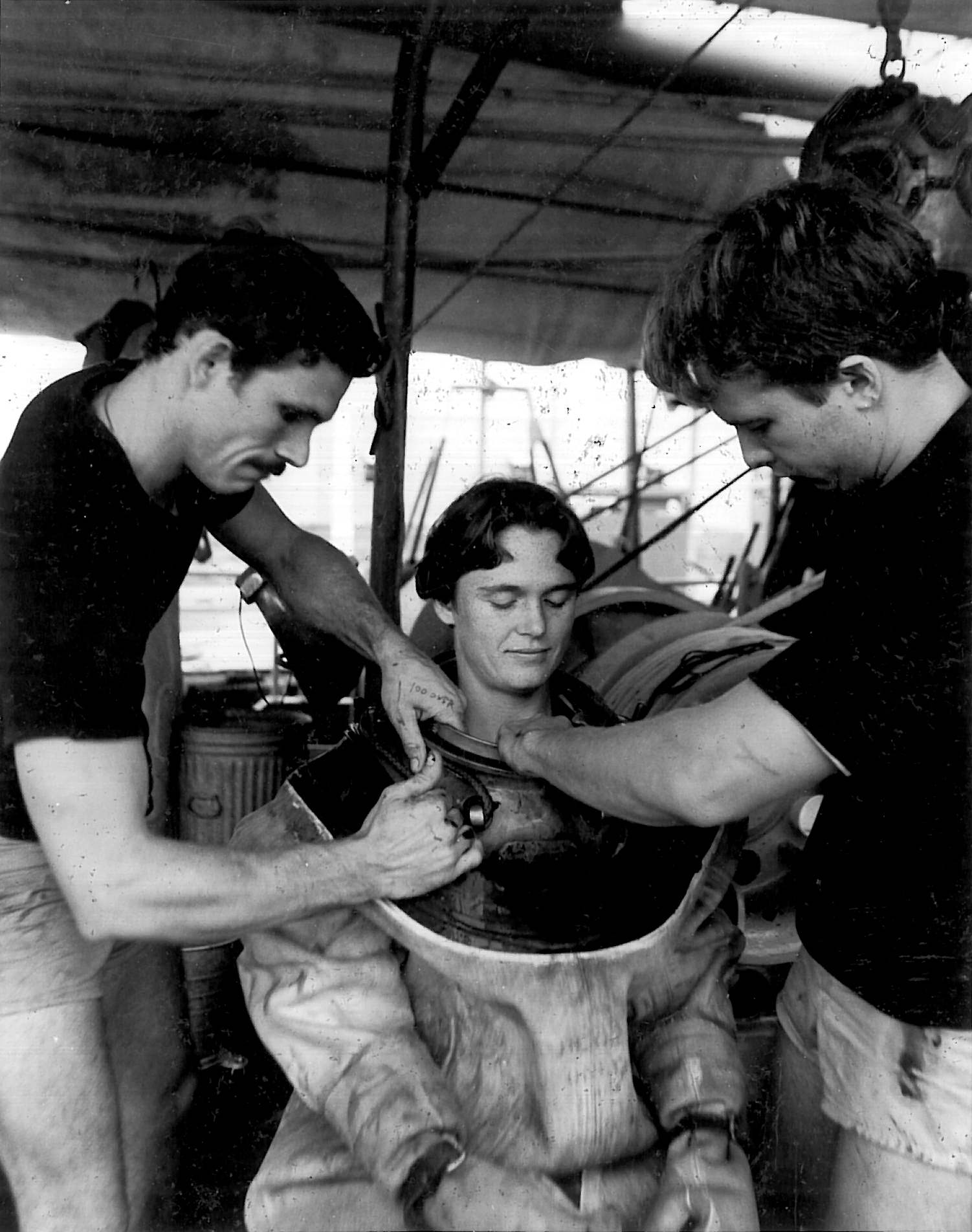
- Photo from 1980 at Naval Diving and Salvage Training Center in Panama City, FL. Mary Bonnin, accompanied by First Class diving students Walt Boyd and Chuck Bloomer, preparing for a Mark V mixed gas training dive.
- Born: March 4, 1956; Baraboo, Wisconsin, U.S.
- Died: August 24, 2026 (aged 70); Panama City Beach, FL
- Military career
- Allegiance: United States
- Branch: Navy
- Service years: 20
- Rank: Master Chief
- Awards: First Female Master Diver

Mary Josephine Bonnin (March 4, 1956 - August 24, 2026) was a former Master Chief in the United States Navy. She retired from her position in 1996. She had been with the United States Navy for 20 years, graduating at the top of her class in both air and gas surface-supplied diving. She then became the first woman Master Diver, and later she would be one of the first women to enter the Women Divers Hall of Fame.

== Military career ==
Mary Bonnin enlisted in the United States Navy in 1976. She graduated top of her class, and later became the first enlisted female diver certified in both air and gas diving. While stationed in Puerto Rico with her husband Ralph, who also served as a Navy diver. She continued diving through the 8th month of her pregnancy, and named her first child Mark after the Mark Five brass diving helmet system. During her tour she trained over one-thousand divers, and worked in various posts around the ship. She also served as the leading diver safety authority. Mary Bonnin eventually retired from the Navy in 1996.

== Achievements ==
Over the course of her military years, she won many awards and honors. She was added into the Women Divers Hall of Fame (WDHOF) in 2000. The WDHOF was designed originally to give tribute to the most notable divers, however it quickly developed into a tribute of women that helped the exploration of the sea. Many notable women have been inducted into the WDHOF such as: Dr. Eugenie Clark, U.S. Chief Scientist Kathy Sullivan, and many others.

== Death ==
On August 22, 2026, Bonnin was in an electric golf cart accident in Panama City Beach, and was taken to a hospital where she was discovered to be undergoing a brain bleed. She died two days later at the age of 70.
