= Szilvia Gogh =

Hungarian scuba diver and stunt performer

- Website: www.szilviagogh.com

Szilvia Gogh is a Hungarian scuba diver and stunt performer. In 2016, she was inducted into the Women Divers Hall of Fame. Gogh is the founder of Gogh Jewelry Design.

== Early life ==
Gogh began diving in Hungary when she was 14 doing underwater orienteering. She attended college in Budapest and undertook goldsmith training at the Budapest Art Institute.

== Career ==
Gogh's screen breakthrough was in a commercial for Axe, which resulted in her becoming Screen Actors Guild (SAG) eligible. Since then, she has worked as an underwater stunt woman and water safety instructor in film and television. She founded a jewelry business, Gogh Jewelry Design, in the early 2000s. Gogh became PADI's youngest female Course Director in the world. She was inducted into the Women Divers Hall of Fame in 2016.

== Personal life ==
In 2016, when Gogh was 39, she was diagnosed with breast cancer. She has a son, Enzo.

== Filmography ==
=== Film ===
| Year | Film | Notes | Ref. |
|---|---|---|---|
| 2010 | Piranha 3D | double for Dina Meyer | |
| 2011 | The Green Hornet | | |
| 2012 | Big Miracle | stunt double in underwater scenes for Drew Barrymore | |
| 2012 | Sinister | | |
| 2015 | The Submarine Kid | | |
| 2019 | The Curse of La Llorona | | |
| 2022 | Don't Worry, Darling | | |
| 2022 | Avatar: The Way of Water | marine coordinator and Zoe Saldana stunt double | |

=== Television ===
| Year | Show | Notes | Ref. |
|---|---|---|---|
| 2010 | Desperate Housewives | | |
| 2013 | Dexter | | |
| 2014 | Agents of S.H.I.E.L.D. | | |
| 2022 | Euphoria | | |
| 2022 | Chicago P.D. | | |
| 2022 | Obi-Wan Kenobi | | |
| 2020-2023 | 9-1-1: Lone Star | | |
