= Tanya Streeter =

British-Caymanian-American freediver

Tanya Streeter (born Tanya Dailey, 10 January 1973, Grand Cayman) is a British-Caymanian-American world champion freediver, inducted into the Women Divers Hall of Fame in March 2000.

For more than two months, from 17 August 2002, she held the overall "No Limit" freediving record (greater than the men's record) with a depth of 525 feet (160 m), which is still the women's world record for NLT (No Limit) Apnea.

== Personal life ==
Streeter was born to Jim and Sandra Dailey in the Cayman Islands. She has two sisters and a brother. She was educated in England at the independent girls' school Roedean and at Brighton University. She met and married her husband Paul Streeter in England. They moved to the Cayman Islands in 1995 and have a daughter and a son. After giving birth Tanya Streeter officially retired from freediving. She currently resides in Austin, Texas. Tanya also has four step children residing in the UK.

== Competitive career ==
Streeter took up freediving at age 25 and almost immediately began to break records. She made her first important breakthrough in 1998 when she bettered Deborah Andollo's Women's AIDA NLT (No Limit) diving record by 10 feet, achieving a total depth of 370 feet (113 m). She was inducted into the Women Divers Hall of Fame in March 2000. In 2002, she broke the men's AIDA International's NLT (No Limit) world diving record by diving to a depth of 525 feet (160 m) near the Turks and Caicos Islands, a record which was surpassed later that year by French diver Loïc Leferme (162 m).

On 19 July 2003 she broke the men's Variable Weight (VWT) world record by diving to a depth of 400 feet (122 m) and held it over a year until the record was broken by Carlos Coste (135 m) in Puerto la Cruz, Venezuela on 27 October 2004. However, as a women's record, it lasted almost seven years, until Natalia Molchanova reached 125 m in June 2010 in Kalamata, Greece.

== Outside freediving ==
Streeter was featured in an Animal Planet documentary, Freediver (aired March 2006), and presented Dive Galapagos (aired March 2007). She presented a documentary shown on BBC Two called Shark Therapy in which she attempted to overcome her fear of sharks. She is a public speaker, presenting "The Deepest Dive Ever" at TEDx in Austin, Texas in 2012, and also at the Divers Alert Network UHMS DAN 2006 Breath-hold Proceedings. She appeared on a set of five commemorative postage stamps distributed by the Turks and Caicos Islands in 2003. In 2014, she appeared as a coach on the television show Calzedonia Ocean Girls. She also features in the documentary A Plastic Ocean (aired 2016), and today focuses on her work as an environmentalist.

== See also ==
- David Apperley
