= Donna Tobias =

American deep sea diver (1952–2010)

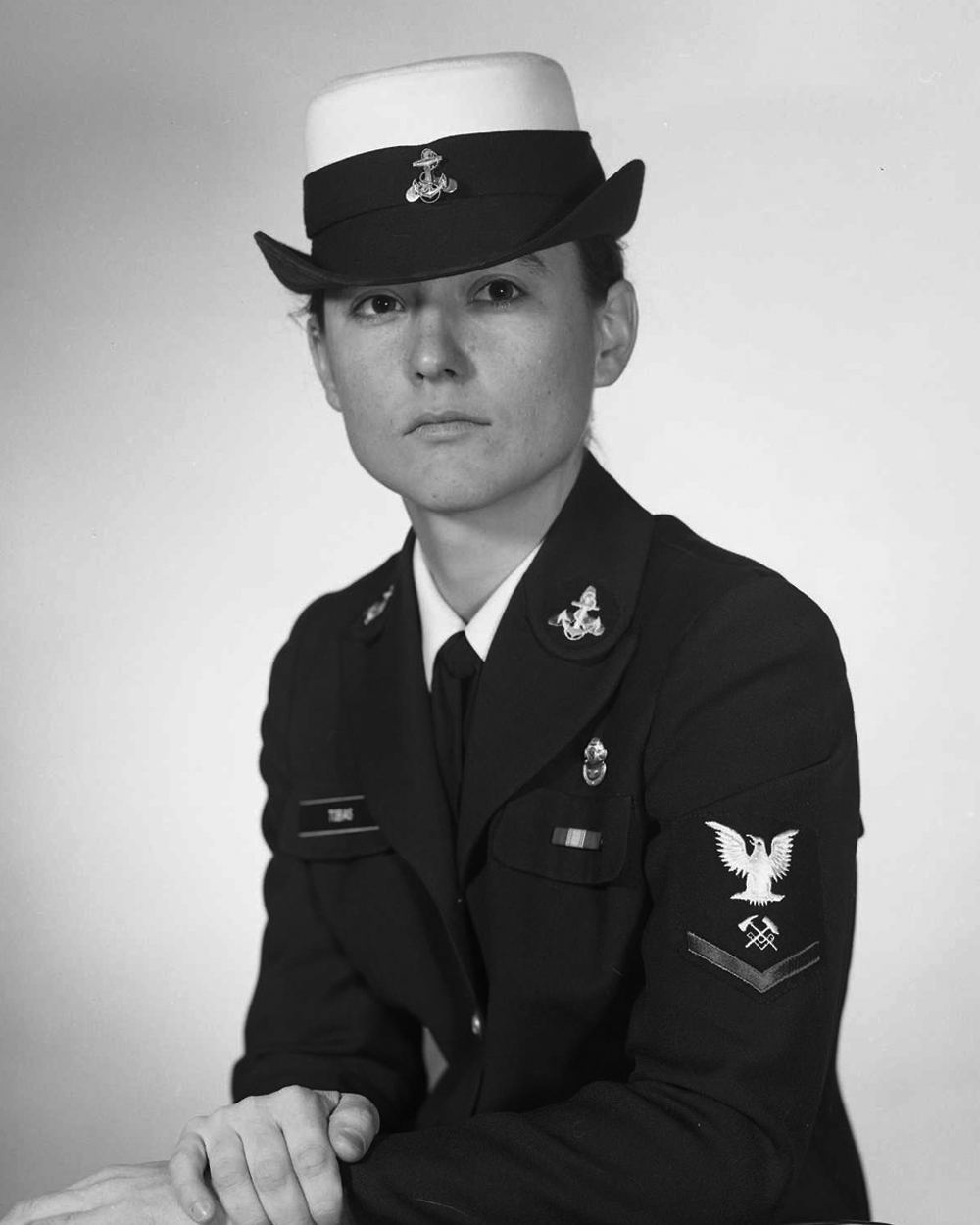
- United States Navy portrait
- Born: 22 May 1952; Los Angeles, California, US
- Died: 21 September 2010 (aged 58)
- Known for: Deep sea diving

Donna M. Tobias (22 May 1952 – 21 September 2010) was an American diver. She was the United States Navy's first female deep sea diver.

== Early life ==
Donna M. Tobias was born on 22 May 1952, to parents Elmer and Marie Tobias in Los Angeles, California. Her father was a former World War II bomber crewman and prisoner of war. As she grew up in a poor household, Tobias took a job as a school bus driver and worked at the police department after high school.

== Career ==
Upon enlisting in the Navy in March 1974, she asked a Navy recruiter about the possibility of her becoming a diver. She was refused entry because of her sex and instead chose to focus on shipfitting and hull technician. While working as a shipfitter and hull technician for the Navy, she applied for a waiver to attend dive school. She was required to get permission from The Pentagon before being assigned to training in Norfolk.

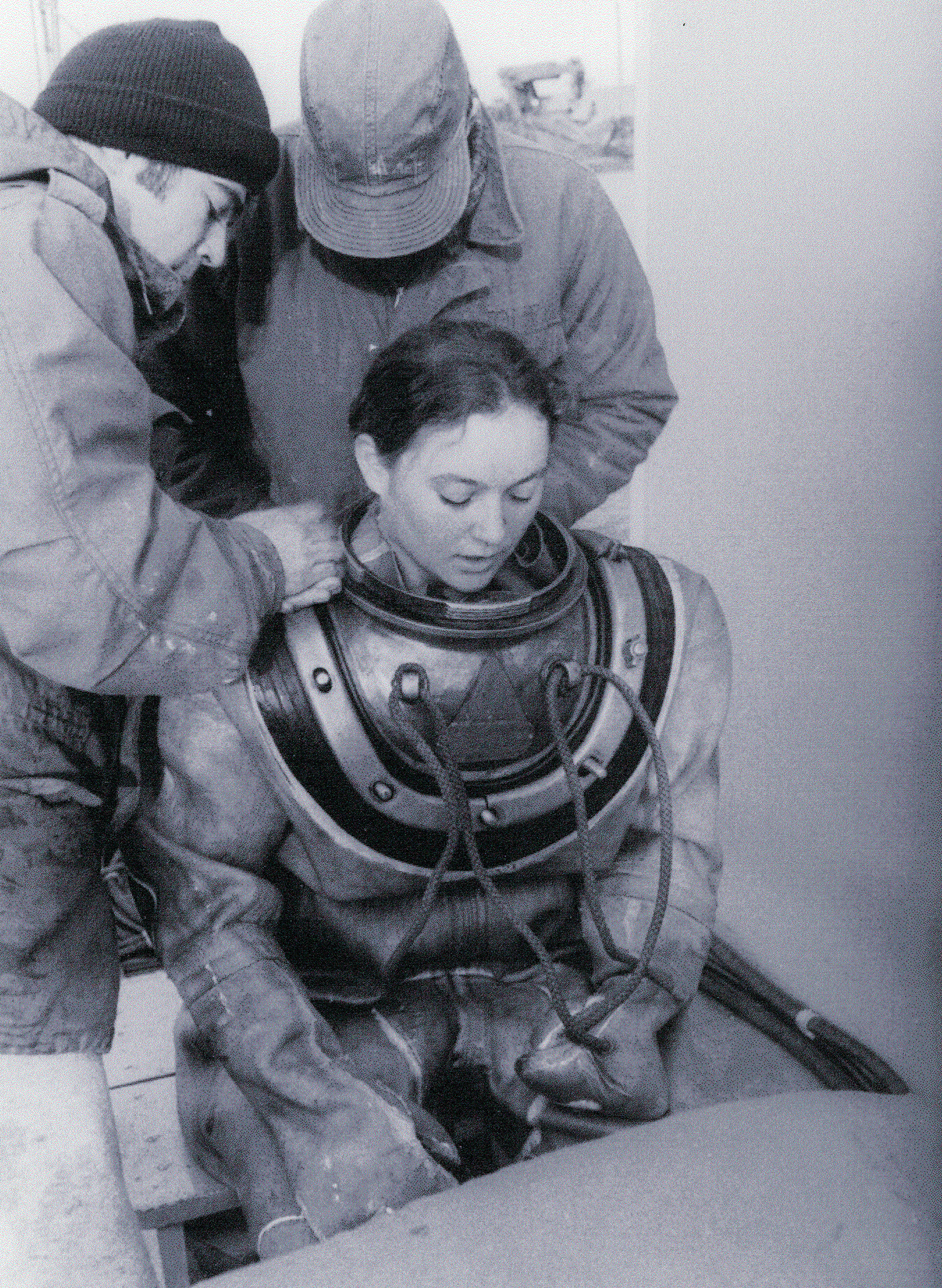
Tobias wears a Mk V diving rig during dive school

At the age of 21, she applied to the Navy 2nd Class Diving School and was accepted two days before the program started in January 1975. During training, she was required to dive while carrying more than 200 pounds of gear in dark, cold or turbulent water. Despite this, Tobias became the first woman to graduate from the Navy Deep Sea Diving School and went on to work with the Navy search and salvage operations. However, she was still limited opportunities due to her gender. She was unable to join sea duty billets so she accepted a position as an instructor at the Submarine Escape Training Tank at Submarine Naval Base in New London. Tobias also worked within the hyperbaric chamber to treat divers suffering embolisms and civilians suffering from carbon monoxide poisoning and gangrene. Retired Master Diver Steven Lechner believed Tobias was the first woman to teach in the escape tank. Her brother Gary also enlisted in the Navy, and she was his instructor at the diving school on base.

After eight years in the Navy, Tobias earned her bachelor's degree in education and a master's in psychology and taught special-education classes at New London High School. In 2001, she was inducted into the Women Divers Hall of Fame.

== Death ==
At the age of 58, Tobias died by suicide due to depression on 21 September 2010.

== Legacy ==
In 2018, the Naval Submarine Base New London unveiled a dive locker named after Tobias.
