= Patricia Beddows =

Canadian hydrogeologist and educator

Patricia A. Beddows
- Education: McMaster University (BA, MSc); University of Bristol (PhD)
- Scientific career
- Fields: Hydrogeology, karst science, environmental science
- Workplaces: Northwestern University

Patricia A. Beddows is a Canadian hydrogeologist, cave diver, and educator known for her research on karst hydrogeology, underwater cave systems, and environmental monitoring. She is Director of Undergraduate Studies for the Department of Earth, Environmental, and Planetary Sciences at Northwestern University.

== Early life and education ==
Beddows completed a Bachelor of Arts and a Master of Science in Geography and Geology at McMaster University. She earned a PhD in geographical sciences from the University of Bristol in 2004.

== Career and research ==
Beddows is a member of the faculty of Northwestern University, where she is Director of Undergraduate Studies and Chair of the Environmental Sciences Steering Committee in the Department of Earth, Environmental, and Planetary Sciences.

Her research focuses on karst environments and cave systems, including hydrogeology, geochemistry, and geomorphology. She studies paleoenvironmental records of sea-level and climate change preserved in cave deposits such as speleothems and sediments.

Her work also addresses water resource management, contaminant transport, geoarchaeology, and ecosystem processes in subterranean environments. She has conducted extensive fieldwork in underwater cave systems, particularly in the Yucatán Peninsula, having credited authorship in different research papers about the region.

=== Cave Pearl Project ===
Beddows is a co-founder of the Cave Pearl Project, an initiative that develops low-cost, open-source environmental monitoring tools for aquatic and cave environments.

The project aims to increase accessibility to scientific instrumentation and support citizen science in environmental monitoring.

=== Diving and exploration ===
Beddows is an active cave diver whose research includes exploration of submerged cave systems. Her work has contributed to studies of hydrology, geology, and archaeology, including research on early human remains discovered in underwater caves in Mexico.

== Honors and recognition ==
Beddows was inducted into the Women Divers Hall of Fame in 2021 in recognition of her contributions to underwater exploration, science, and education.

== Teaching and outreach ==
At Northwestern University, Beddows teaches courses in climate science, hydrology, environmental science, and field methods. She is known for incorporating field-based learning into her teaching. She received a community building award from Northwestern's Weinberg College of Arts and sciences. She participated extensively in National Geographic's Strange Days on Planet Earth episode Dirty Secrets - Buried Trouble, which highlighted her technique of using "nontoxic dye along with other techniques to track the course of water underground" when "trying to find out how and what pollutants and bacteria are infiltrating" water supplies.

== See also ==
- Cave diving
- Speleology
