= Pamela Balash-Webber =

American diving instructor and ocean conservationist (1953–2020)

Pamela Balash-Webber

Pamela "Pam" Sue Balash-Webber (1953-2020) was an American diving instructor and ocean conservationist.

She was born in Albion, Michigan, and lived most her life on Saint Thomas, U.S. Virgin Islands. She had a sister.

Balash-Webber worked for the Professional Association of Diving Instructors (PADI) organization for many years, and became a district course director in 1989. She was one of the first two American women to teach recreational diving in Russia. With her husband, Andre, she owned and ran a diving club on Saint Thomas. They worked together to have moorings installed at dive sites in the United States Virgin Islands to protect the reefs from damage.

Andre died in 2014, 54 years old. Pamela died in late 2020, having had scleroderma and rheumatoid arthritis for several years. They share an underwater memorial at Andres reef, near Buck Island.

In 2022, she was one of five women to be inducted into the Women Divers Hall of Fame.
