= Andrea Marshall =

American marine biologist

Dr. Andrea Marshall
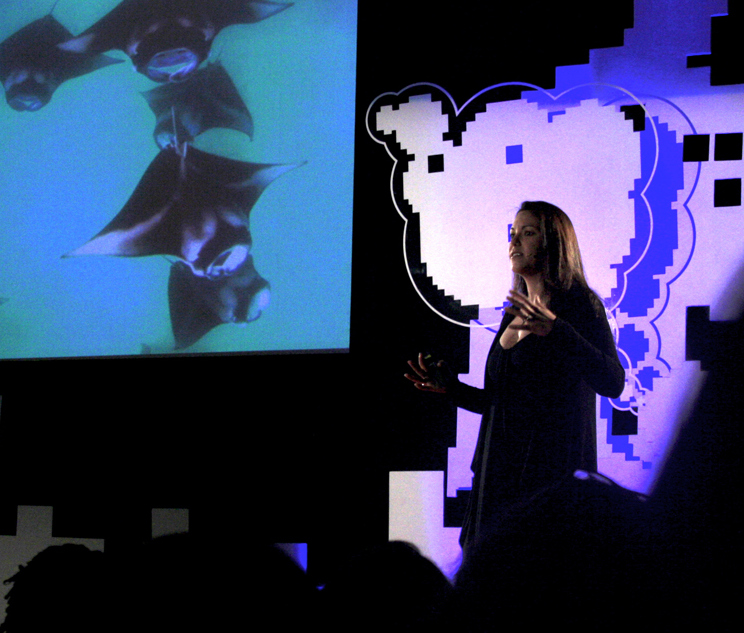
- Marshall in 2012
- Occupation: Marine Biologist
- Employer: Marine Megafauna Foundation
- Known for: Research and Protection of Manta Rays, Whale Sharks, and other large marine animals
- Spouse: Janneman Conradie
- Scientific career
- Education: PhD from Queensland University
- Fields: Marine Biology, Marine Conservation, Photography
- Workplaces: Marine Megafauna Foundation
- Thesis: Biology and Population Ecology of Manta Birostris in Southern Mozambique (2008)
- Doctoral advisor: Michael Bennett
- Website: http://www.queenofmantas.com/

Andrea Marshall is a marine biologist known for wildlife conservation and research on large marine animals like manta rays & whale sharks. Marshall is co-founder and a principal scientist of the Marine Megafauna Foundation, where she leads many of MMF’s projects around the world.

Marshall is the subject of the Natural World documentary Andrea: Queen of Mantas. In 2013, she was named a National Geographic "Emerging Explorer" for her pioneering research and conservation work.

In early 2024, Marshall suffered a life-threatening stroke as a result of a ruptured aneurism while working in Mexico. Marshall survived after weeks in a coma, but lives with life-changing impairments.

== Early life and education ==
Marshall's interest for marine life started around age five and she was certified to dive at 12. In her youth she was always most interested in sharks. She did an undergraduate degree at the College of Creative Studies at the University of California Santa Barbara in the United States.

In 2008, Marshall earned her PhD from the University of Queensland in Australia. She was the first person in the world to be awarded a PhD for manta ray ecology.

== Career ==
After completing her thesis in 2008, Marshall stayed on in Mozambique to spearhead the conservation efforts of this species along this remote African coastline. In 2009, Marshall co-founded the Marine Megafauna Foundation with fellow classmate Simon J Pierce to establish a manta ray and whale shark research program.

Marshall also studies other species of elasmobranchs in southern Mozambique such including endangered wedgefish, mobula rays, whale sharks and leopard sharks, as well as species that are data deficient such as the smalleye stingray and important reef predators in Africa, like bull sharks.

While part of the International Union for the Conservation of Nature Shark Specialist Group (SSG) Marshall wrote the first UICN Red List assessment for manta rays. Later on an exploratory mission to Mozambique she stumbled upon a large population of manta rays. and decided to remain in Mozambique and study them.

In 2009, she formally described a new species of manta ray and wrote two scientific papers differentiating the two species, the giant oceanic manta ray (Mobula birostris) and the reef manta ray (Mobula alfredi). In 2010, Marshall announced she had found a third species of manta ray in the Atlantic and has spent years trying to formally describe this elusive species. In 2025, she coauthored the description of this third species, the Atlantic manta ray (Mobula yarae).

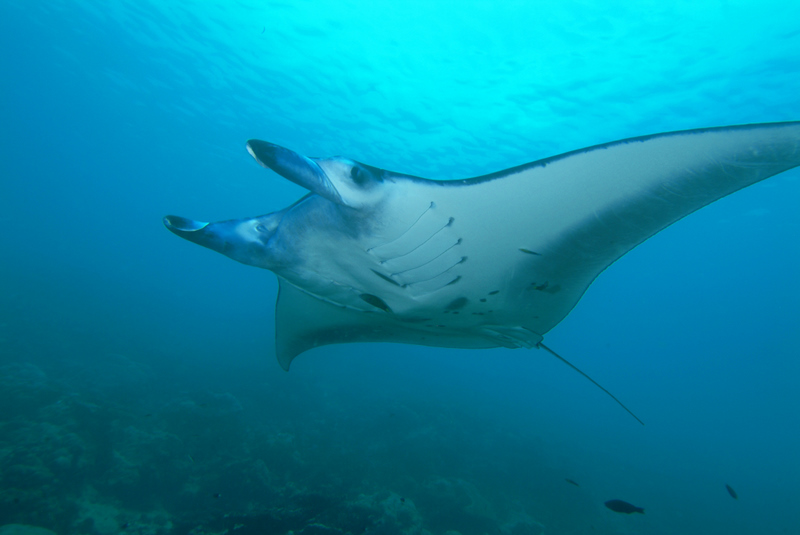
Reef Manta Ray

As a professional underwater photographer, Marshall often uses this medium to support her research. To help study manta rays she developed Manta Matcher, the first global online citizen science database for identifying individual manta rays from their unique markings, which is now one of the online Wildbooks from WildMe, an organization that she a scientific advisor for.

== Media appearances ==
Marshall has appeared in several wildlife television documentaries for Broadcasters including BBC's Natural World documentary Andrea: Queen of Mantas (2009), their popular series 'Sharks' (2015) and 'Africa with Ade' (2019). She also appeared on the show Wild Things with Dominic Monaghan on BBC America and 'Man to Manta' with actor Martin Clunes. Andrea has been featured in print media all over the world and has given talks for National Geographic Live and TED.

== Foundations and honors ==
- Marshall is one of the executive directors and co-founders of the Marine Megafauna Foundation (MMF), a 501c3 in the United States with chapters globally. This foundation strives to save ocean giants from extinction.
- National Geographic also endowed the 2013 Emerging Explorer honor to Andrea, believing her to be a notable new explorer.
- Also in 2017, Marshall was awarded the Sea Hero of the Year award by Scuba Diver Magazine
- In January 2022, Sylvia Earle's foundation, Mission Blue, announced a partnership with Marshall as the Hope Spot Champion for their new Hope Spot- the Inhambane Seascape in southern Mozambique
- In 2023, Marshall was inducted into the Women Divers Hall of Fame
- Andrea is a global brand ambassador for ScubaPro.
