= Claudia Serpieri =

Italian technical diver and depth record holder

- Born: Rome, Italy
- Occupation: technical diver & instructor
- Awards: Women Divers Hall of Fame

Claudia Serpieri is a world record-holding Italian technical diver and instructor. She was co-founder with Stefano Di Cagno of the team BioHazard, the extreme dive team of DDR Org. Deep Diving Research Organization, which has partnerships with space agencies, hyperbaric researchers, universities and the Navy (see Nave Proteo), and chief editor of Captain Nemo magazine for five years. She was the first to use a closed circuit rebreather in a deep dive, in the 2002, with 105 m./344,5 ft. in Lake Bracciano, Italy. She is actually a PADI Staff Instructor, PTA Instructor Trainer, and lives and works in Sharm El Sheikh, Egypt at MHM Blue World Diving Center.

== World records ==
She holds a number of world records:

- women's deepest dive on open circuit (211 m or 692 ft),
- women's deepest altitude dive in lake (180 m or 591 ft),
- women's deepest wreck dive (129 m or 423 ft).

She also holds the Italian women’s record for deepest dive in a sinkhole (103 m or 338 ft) and in a cave (86 m or 282 ft), and leads the exploration team at the sinkhole Merro in Italy (199 m or 653 ft).

== Bibliography ==
- Stefano Di Cagno, Morire quassotto sarebbe darvi una soddisfazione, Captain Nemo Edizioni, 2004
- Stefano Di Cagno, Incubi Decompressivi, Captain Nemo Edizioni, 2006
- Fabio Perozzi, Aria Profonda, Magenes Edizioni, 2010
- Francesco S. D'Aquino, Luca Lucarini, Fabio Perozzi, Blu Estremo, Magenes Edizioni, 2012
- Stefano Di Cagno, Fantasmi d'acqua, Captain Nemo Edizioni, 2013
- Stefano Di Cagno, Laura Vernotico, Subnormali, la pseudoscienza nell'attività subacquea, Captain Nemo Edizioni, 2015
