= Cristina Zenato =

Italian shark diver and conservationist

- Born: 1971 (age 54–55); Italy
- Years active: 1994-present
- Known for: Shark diving
- Website: cristinazenato.com

Cristina Zenato is an Italian-born shark diver and conservationist. She is known for her work with Caribbean reef sharks in The Bahamas.

== Early life ==
Zenato was born in Italy in 1971. Her father was a special forces military diver. She was raised in the Congo until she was 15. She completed high school in Italy.

== Career ==
Zenato began scuba diving at age 22 when traveling to The Bahamas. She started training as a dive instructor and working with sharks in 1995. The same year, she began working for Underwater Explorer's Society (UNEXSO). Later, she became both a PADI Course Director and NSS-CDS Cave Diving Instructor. Zenato's cave diving projects have included remapping the underwater caves in the Lucayan National Park. Zenato was inducted into the Women Divers Hall of Fame in 2011. She is known for promoting the conservation of, diving with, removing fish hooks from Caribbean reef sharks around Grand Bahama Island. Her work has garnered her the titles of "shark whisperer" and "mother of sharks."

Zenato has been featured in films and television programmes including Shark Week's Sharktacular, Against the Current, and Save This Shark. In the late 2010s, she founded the non-profit, People of the Water. She completed her PADI Course Director training in 2016.

== Personal life ==
Zenato first went to the Bahamas in 1994, during which time she decided she wanted to move there permanently. She met her partner, Kewin Lorenzen, in 2018.
