= Lesley Rochat =

South African underwater photographer, filmmaker and environmental activist

- Born: Pretoria, South Africa
- Education: University of Cape Town
- Occupations: Conservationist, author, speaker, photographer, film director
- Website: lesleyrochat.com

Lesley Rochat is a South African marine and shark conservationist, campaigner, wildlife filmmaker, underwater photographer, environmental writer, author, speaker and activist. She founded the non-profit organisation AfriOceans Conservation Alliance in 2003 for which she is the chief executive officer.

Rochat is a leading figure in efforts to conserve our oceans, and in shark conservation in particular. Due to her passionate efforts in shark conservation, and the lengths she goes to, to raise awareness and change negative perceptions of sharks, such as freediving with sharks, she is known as the Shark Warrior. In 2014, Rochat won the Johnnie Walker / Sunday Times Nations Greatest Challenger Award for her work in conservation in South Africa and for challenging conformity. In 2010 she was inducted into the Women Divers Hall of Fame. In 2013 she was inducted into the Global Oceans Society. In 2015 she was nominated for a second time for Africa's Most Influential Women in Business and Government Awards. She has appeared in numerous TV shows promoting ocean conservation including CBS News.

== Background ==
=== Early life ===
Rochat was born in Pretoria, South Africa to Bryan Allon Rochat and Leilani Rochat. She is the middle child of a family of nine children, eight girls and one boy. Her love for the ocean was instilled from an early age when growing up along the Garden Route of South Africa.

=== Education ===
She matriculated at Krugersdorp High School. She holds a Perf. Dip. from the University of Cape Town, South Africa.

=== Early career ===
Rochat began modelling while studying at the University of Cape Town. She modeled swimwear and underwear for brands such Le Coq Sportif and Arena, Garlicks and Woolworths. After graduating from the University of Cape Town's Drama School, Rochat was accepted into the Performing Arts Council (PACT) of the Transvaal (now Gauteng Province). She was cast in leading roles, playing alongside South Africa's leading actors and actresses such as Sandra Prinsloo. She was a professional actress, going on to co-direct and perform and sing in cabaret shows, perform at the State Theatre, South Africa in Pretoria, act in South African SABC TV productions, and as a SABC TV Presenter for a weekly magazine program. She diversified into the corporate world becoming a successful insurance agent with Liberty Life South Africa. In 2003 she founded AfriOceans Conservation Alliance.

== Current Work ==
=== AfriOceans Conservation Alliance ===
Rochat is the chief executive officer of AfriOceans Conservation Alliance, a registered Section 21 non-profit organisation focused on marine and shark conservation based in Cape Town, South Africa. AfriOceans became established as a leading ocean conservation organisation in South Africa through the Maxine, Science, Education and Awareness Programme, a shark conservation project designed by Rochat, which involved the satellite tagging and releasing of captive raggedtooth sharks (sand tiger shark) from the Two Oceans Aquarium in South Africa. Rochat is also the principal photographer and videographer for the organisation. In 2010 under Rochat's leadership, the AfriOceans Warriors Environmental Programme, an environmental education programme funded by the National Lottery of South Africa, was established.

SWIM LIKE A SHARK is another of Rochat's educational programs, launched in 2015, which teaches water skills to underprivileged children while nurturing the next generation of ocean guardians.

=== Documentary Filmmaker ===
Rochat is the CEO of Blue Pulse Pictures, her documentary film company which produces awareness documentaries focused on the oceans. She is a producer for the SABC3 TV Human/Nature show since 2004 50|50 and has produced a number of inserts for them, including Sharks in Deep Trouble, a documentary about shark finning in South African waters.

=== Photographer, Environmental Writer and Author ===
Rochat is an environmental photojournalist and underwater photographer. Her bylines and images have been published in many newspapers (in 2010 Rochat covered the CITES conference in Doha Qatar for Associated Press) and magazines including Africa Geographic, Ocean Geographic, Diver Magazine, and Asian Diver. She runs photographic expeditions and wildlife safaris through her company, Shark Warrior Adventures. She is the author of educational books for children, namely Sharks, Teachers Handbook, Alphabet of the Sea, Marine Activities, and Feebee the Turtle.

=== Campaigner ===
Through AfriOceans Rochat produces campaigns aimed at raising awareness about critical ocean issues. With Saatchi & Saatchi, Cape Town, Rochat created the Rethink the Shark campaign which won a Wildscreen Panda Award in 2008. This was followed by her Rethink the Predator campaign, and Oceans Reach Out campaign. In 2012 Rochat launched the Shark Warrior campaign through AfriOceans which identifies high profile individuals who lend their fame and name to the shark conservation cause. These include South Africa's sexiest man 2014 and celebrity Johnathan Boyton-Lee, champion freediver, Trevor Hutton who dove to 70 metres in the AfriOceans Deep Freedive for Sharks campaign, and big wave surfer Frank Solomon.

=== Extreme Conservationist ===
Given the lengths Rochat goes to, to raise awareness, Rochat is considered an extreme conservationist. For two of her awareness campaigns Catches Anything, Kills Everything and Get Hooked on Conservation, Ban Drumlines, Rochat stripped naked and posed underwater with sharks surrounding her. Rochat is the voice for those who cannot speak and is often on international and national TV shows challenging policies and practices which harm marine life.

=== Speaker ===
As a public speaker, Rochat speaks at events and to companies, organisations, universities and schools. Raising awareness about the oceans and global environmental change are key messages in her multi-media presentations.
