= Lisa Franzen =

Italian and Russian Model

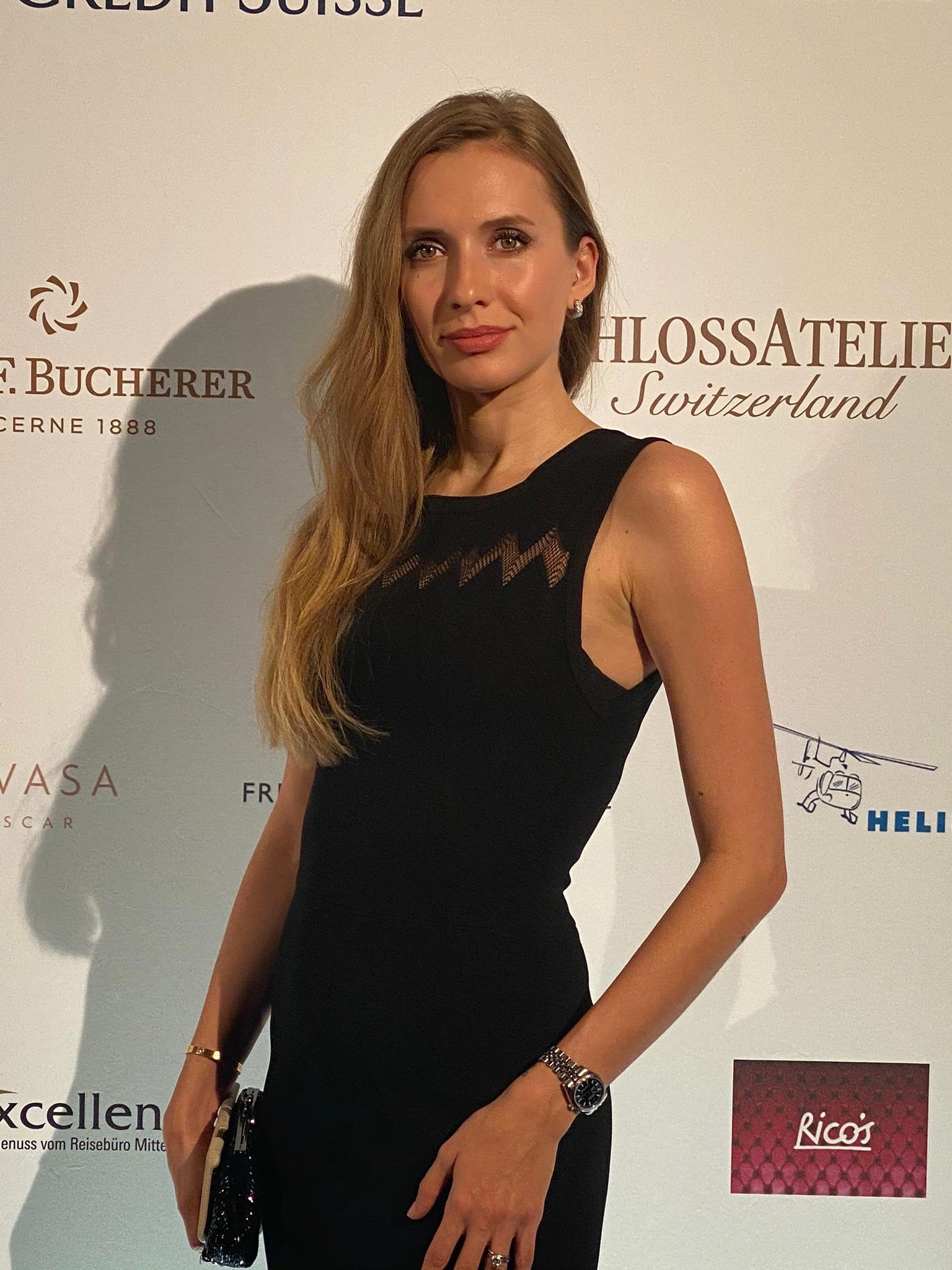
- Born: 1 August 1989 (age 33); Kazan, Russia
- Citizenship: Italy
- Education: Istituto Marangoni, London
- Occupations: model, interior designer
- Years active: since 2003
- Spouse: Marcel Franzen
- Modeling information
- Height: 1.74 m (5 ft 9 in)
- Hair color: blonde
- Eye color: brown-green

Lisa Franzen (born Elizaveta Migatcheva on 1 August 1989 in Kazan, Russia) is an Italian and Russian former model, interior designer, artist and entrepreneur. Lisa is the winner of the Miss World Italy 2006 title and represented Italy in the same year in the Miss World pageant in Poland.

== Early life and education ==
Lisa Franzen (born Elizaveta Migatcheva) was born in Kazan. Both her parents (Julia Toumisova and Illia Migatchev) were professional ballet dancers in Bolshoi Theatre. After her parents divorced, she moved at the age of four with her mother to Rome. In Italy, she attended a strict Catholic school. Lisa was educated in Rome's "European classical high school — Vittorio Emanuele II national boarding school" Prati area.

She graduated from Interior Design Studies in London and then moved to Milan.

== Career ==
At the beginning of 2006, she received an invitation to the beauty pageant "Miss World Italy". Lisa won the contest and became "Miss World Italy" at only 17 years old. She represented Italy at the 56th edition of the Miss World pageant in Warsaw, Poland. Lisa arrived second at Miss World Talent.

In 2007 on an invitation from the Sri Lanka Tourist Board, she visited Sri Lanka as part of the state program to promote the tourist image of the country.

In 2008, Lisa was the valet of the 29th edition of "Processo di Biscardi," the sports program on 7Gold. In 2013 she was a special guest on Miss Mondo Italia.

In 2014, Lisa Franzen participated in Calzedonia Ocean Girls, an Italian reality television series. The show, presented by Simone Annicchiarico, was broadcast on Sky Uno/Cielo.

== Entrepreneur and design career ==
In March 2021, she founded Franzen & Casa SA, an interior architecture, and design firm.

She developed a limited-edition furniture collection and is represented by two galleries: Galerie Philia NY and Freeman Gallery Sydney.

== Personal life ==
She is the wife of Swiss entrepreneur Marcel Franzen and daughter-in-law of Swiss entrepreneur, businessman (co-founder and former CEO of Interhome AG) and classical Italian opera patron Bruno Franzen.
