= Simon J Pierce =

Marine Biologist & Conservationist

Dr. Simon J Pierce
- Occupation: Marine Biologist
- Employer: Marine Megafauna Foundation
- Known for: Research and Protection of Whale Sharks, Manta Rays and other large marine animals
- Scientific career
- Education: School of Biomedical Sciences, The University of Queensland
- Fields: Marine Biology, Marine Conservation, Photography
- Workplaces: Marine Megafauna Foundation
- Thesis: Biology, demography and conservation of rays in Moreton Bay, Queensland, Australia (2009)
- Doctoral advisor: Michael B. Bennett
- Website: https://www.simonjpierce.com/

Simon J Pierce is a marine biologist and conservationist known for discovering, studying, and protecting large marine animals such as whale sharks and manta rays. He is the co-founder and principal scientist of the Marine Megafauna Foundation.

Pierce has developed several non-invasive research techniques for endangered species, such as developing photo-identification with computer image analysis and artificial intelligence to track populations of whale sharks and other species of marine animal.

These techniques have been incorporated into Citizen Science projects, including Sharkbook, the global shark monitoring database, as well as other MMF projects such as Manta Matcher.

He led the conservation assessment on whale sharks for the IUCN Red List in 2016, which resulted in the whale shark’s global protection through an Appendix I listing on the UN Convention on Migratory Species in 2017 and then led the first IUCN Green Status conservation assessment on whale sharks in 2021.

Pierce is a wildlife photographer.
