= Marine Megafauna Foundation =

US-based nonprofit organization

- Formation: 2009
- Founders: Andrea Marshall and Simon J Pierce
- Founded at: Tofo Beach, Mozambique
- Legal status: 501(c)(3) non-profit conservation organization
- Headquarters: West Palm Beach, Florida, United States
- Affiliations: Manta Matcher, Sharkbook (formerly Whaleshark.org), Galapagos Whaleshark Project, Byron Bay Leopard Shark Project, Madagascar Whale Shark Project
- Website: marinemegafauna.org
- Formerly called: Manta Ray & Whale Shark Research Centre

The Marine Megafauna Foundation (MMF) is a marine biology research and conservation nonprofit known for discovering, researching, and protecting large marine animals including whale sharks, manta rays, sea turtles, whales, and dugongs.

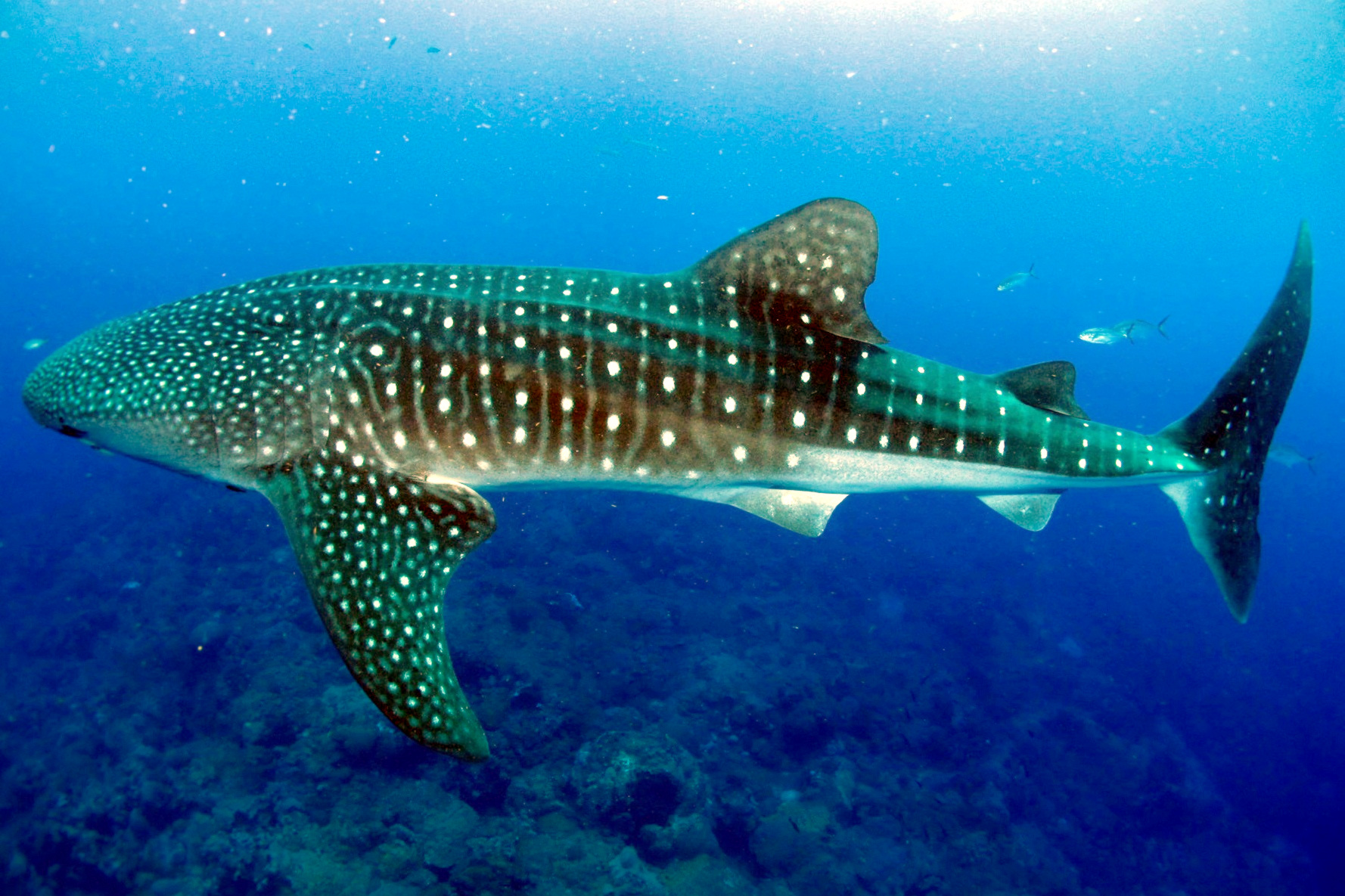
Whale sharks are the world's biggest fish.

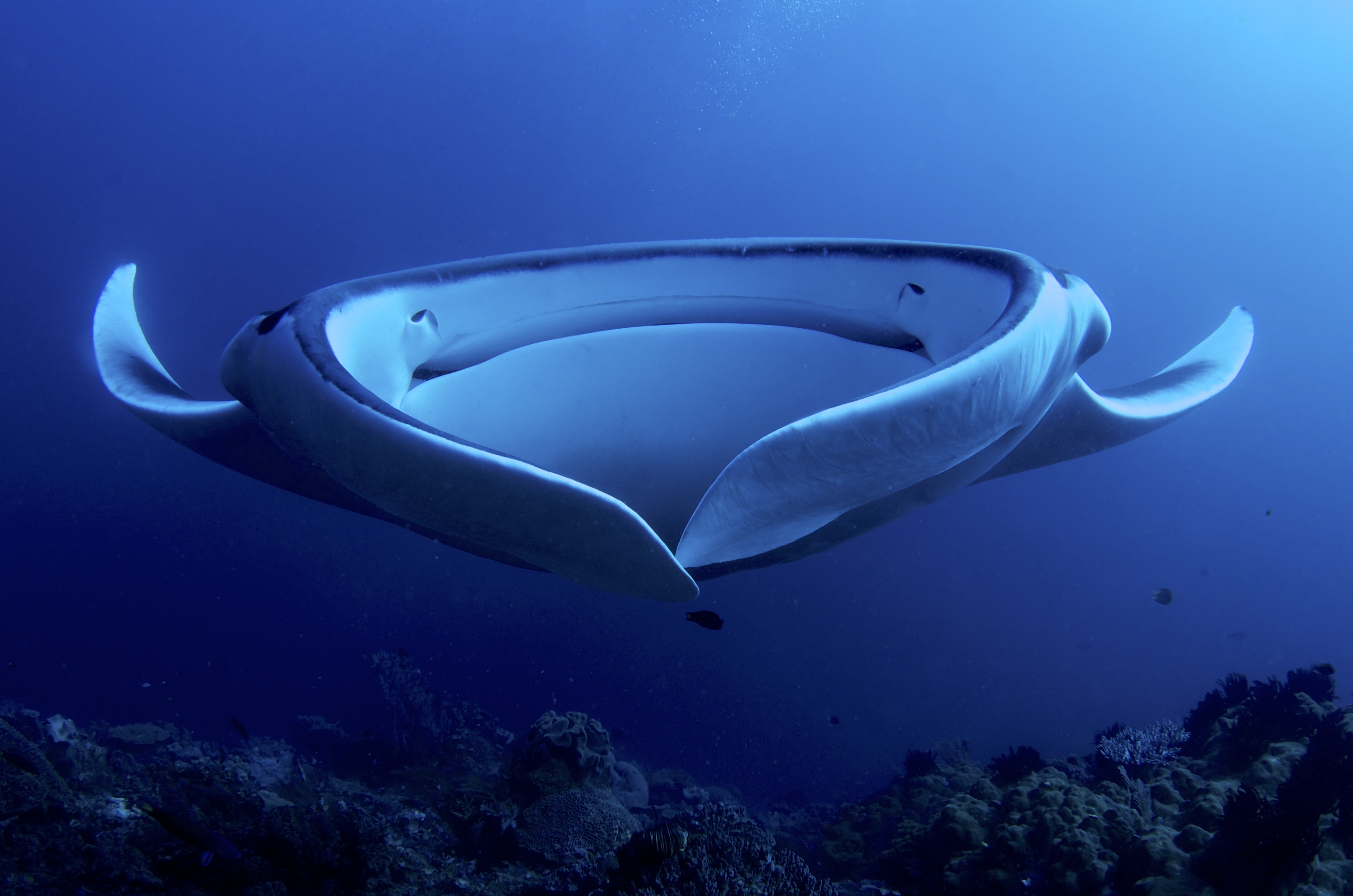
Giant manta ray

MMF has permanent research & conservation sites in Mozambique, Australia, Indonesia, and Florida, as well as other temporary locations.

== History ==
MMF was founded in 2009 by marine biologists Andrea Marshall and Simon J Pierce in Tofo Beach, Mozambique.

== Discoveries, research, and conservation initiatives ==
- Developed new techniques to use photo identification and artificial intelligence to study and track populations of whale sharks and other marine animals. These are incorporated in Citizen science programs such as Sharkbook and Manta Matcher.
- Discovered a new type of Manta, the "reef manta ray" (Manta alfredi)
- Led initiatives to add whale sharks, reef manta rays, and oceanic manta rays to the IUCN Red List of Threatened Species.
- Established the Inhambane Province Hope Spot in collaboration with Sylvia Earle's Mission Blue
- Documented the first sightings of the ornate eagle ray (Aetomylaeus vespertilio) in the Bazaruto Archipelago National Park, Inhambane Province, Mozambique
- Documented the first recorded sighting of a live Smalleye Stingray underwater in 2009 and then the first successful tag of "the World's biggest ocean stingray" in 2023.
- Completed the first study of South Florida manta ray population Luu, and created what was reported to be the first digital 3D manta ray model with the Digital Life Project and ANGARI Foundation.
- Uncovered illegal Chinese fishing practices after a whale shark named "Hope" with a satellite tag tracked by MMF was killed in Galapagos. This incident resulted in expansion of the Marine Protected Zone around the Galapagos.
- Created "Ocean Guardians" conservation education project in Mozambique recognized by UNESCO.
