= Roberta Mancino =

Italian skydiver (born 1980)

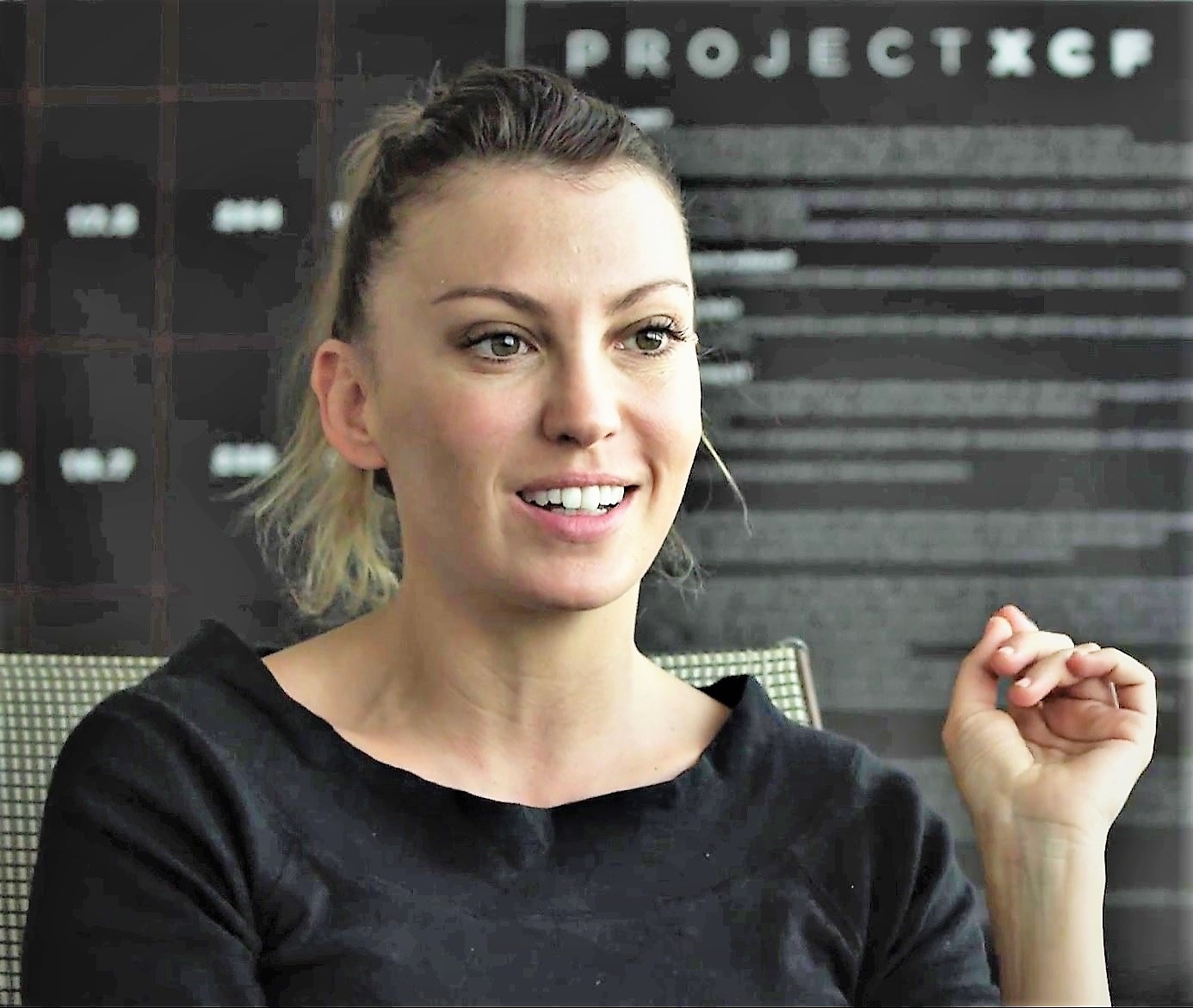
- Mancino discusses the Project XCF progression towards the world's smallest parachute in 2014

Personal information
- Born: August 3, 1980 (age 46) Anzio, Italy

Sport
- Sport: BASE jumping, Skydiving, Wingsuit flying

Roberta Mancino is an Italian skydiver, BASE jumper, wingsuit flyer and international model. She has participated in more than 12,500 skydives and won several awards and world records. She has gone on four skydives while completely naked, and on five occasions her parachute did not open in mid-jump. In 2010, Mancino was named the World's Sexiest Female Athlete by the magazine Men's Fitness.

== Biography ==
Born in Italy, Mancino was 16 when she did her first modeling work for a magazine. She started skydiving in October 2001. Mancino convinced her best friend, a skydiver, to take her on a jump even though he encouraged her not to because it was too dangerous. She began to take it more seriously as a profession when people started asking her to coach them. Eventually, Mancino started participating in international competitions.

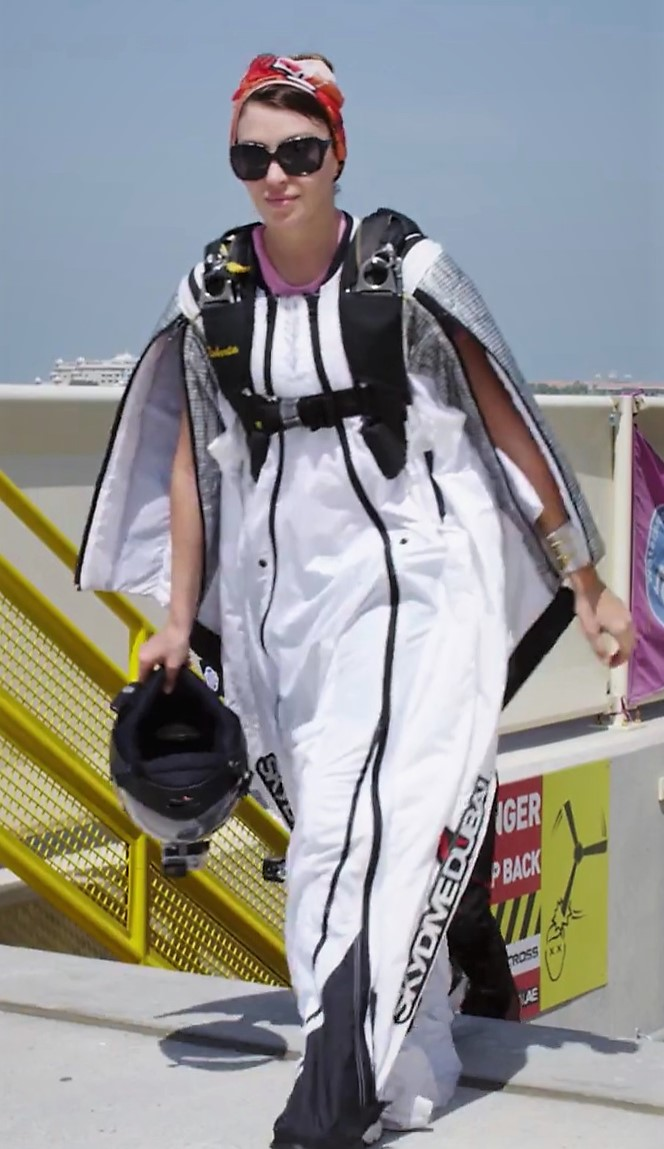
Mancino in wingsuit in 2014

She regularly trains at the Skyventure XP Paraclete in North Carolina. Her parachute has malfunctioned five times though she was able to use the reserve. She has also made four jumps while completely naked for magazine photo shoots. In 2008, Mancino appeared on the Italian television program Le Iene with Marco Berry, jumping topless and demonstrating her freeflying and sit flying skills. Mancino met her former boyfriend, BASE jumper Jeb Corliss, in 2009 after he learned about her jumps and arranged to meet her. In 2009, after having made about 5,500 skydives, Mancino started BASE jumping along with Corliss. She performed in 115 BASE jumps (35 with wingsuit) between August 2009 and September 2011. Also inspired by Corliss, she began wingsuit flying, which involves jumping from an aircraft wearing a jumpsuit with webbed wings similar to a flying squirrel. This led to proximity flying, which is the flying of a wingsuit near to cliffs and trees during the flight, the jumper then deploys their parachute once they have moved a safe distance away from any hazards (similar to BASE jumping in this respect).

One of her dreams is to BASE jump off the Burj Khalifa, the tallest man-made structure in the world, and circle around it as she goes down. She also aspires to jump out of a plane and reenter the same plane as it dives. She has participated in big way formation skydiving. Regarding freestyle skydiving, Mancino said, "It becomes kind of boring to me because it's too solitary ... I prefer group activity". As a model, she has appeared in Men's Fitness, Vanity Fair, Allure, Maxim, Men's Health, Max. In 2010, Mancino was named the World's Sexiest Female Athlete by the magazine Men's Fitness. As of December 2010, Mancino has gone on more than 7,000 skydives. In 2014 she was a coach on the TV show Calzedonia Ocean Girls.

== Records and awards ==
In 2003, Roberta Mancino placed first in the Malevski Cup at the Russia Freestyle and the Space Games Freestyle. In 2004, she won first place in the Tunnel Competition in Orlando, Florida. She received both the Italian Record and Euro Record for skydiving in 2005, and won first place in the Tunnel Competition in Perris Valley, California. In 2007, Mancino broke the European Record for Formation Freefly and the World Record for Formation 69-Way Freefly. Also that year, she placed first in the Italian Nationals of Skydiving. In 2009, she took part to a world record 108-way freefly in Chicago.

In September 2013 she placed 2nd overall women in the ProBase Worldcup held in Stechelberg, Switzerland.
