= Manta Matcher =

Manta ray photo identification database

- Legal status: nonprofit
- Purpose: Online citizen science database to identify and track manta rays
- Parent organization: Marine Megafauna Foundation, WildMe
- Website: https://www.mantamatcher.org

Manta Matcher is a global online database for manta rays.

== Creation ==
It is one of the Wildbook Web applications developed by Wild Me, a 501(c)(3) not-for-profit organization in the United States, and was created in partnership with Andrea Marshall of the Marine Megafauna Foundation.

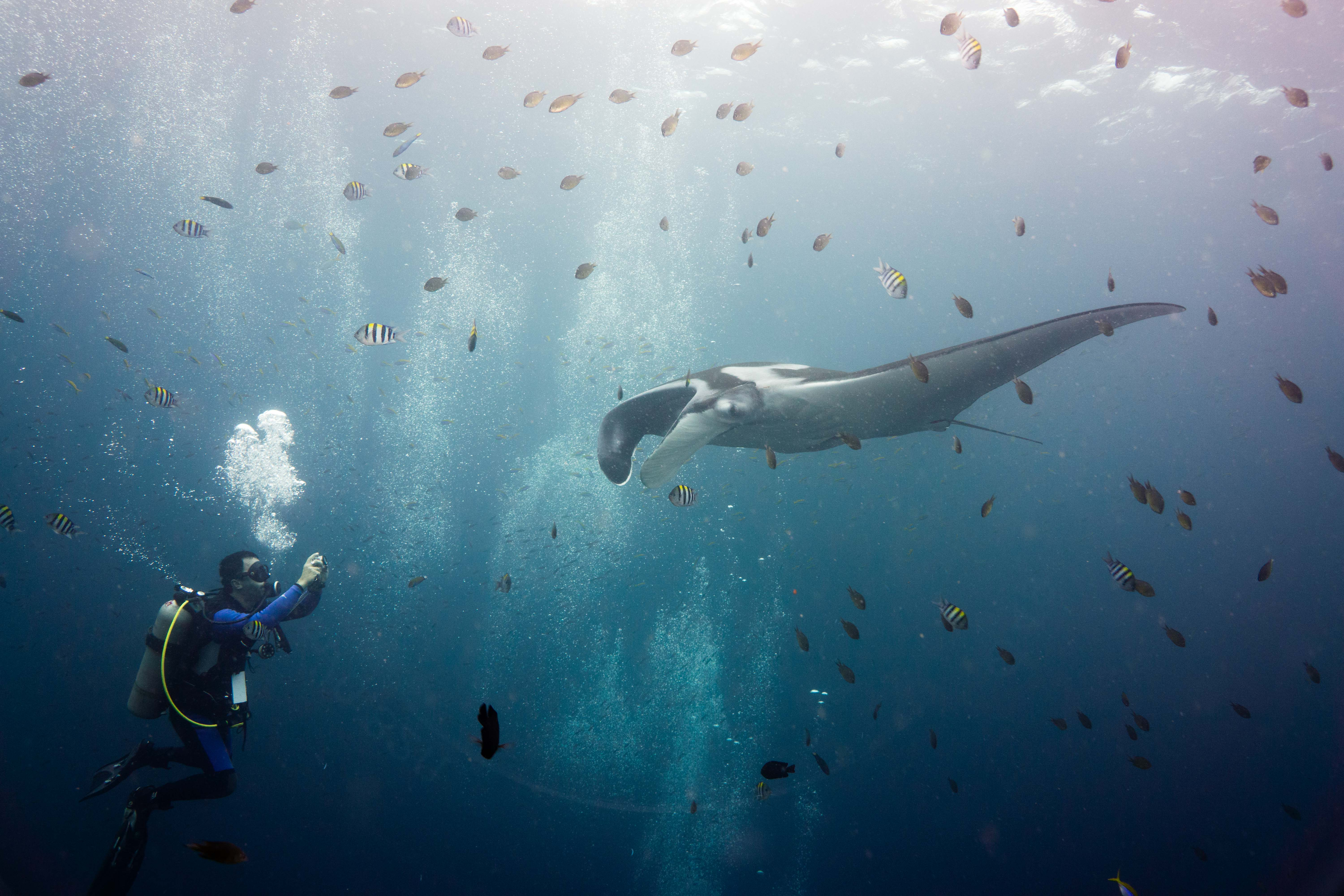
Oceanic manta ray being photographed

Manta rays have unique spot patterning on their undersides, which allows for individual identification. Scuba divers around the world can photograph mantas and upload their manta identification photographs to the Manta Matcher website, supporting global research and conservation efforts.

== Identification of rays ==
Manta Matcher is a pattern-matching software that eases researcher workload; key spot pattern features are extracted using a scale-invariant feature transform (SIFT) algorithm, which can cope with complications presented by highly variable spot patterns and low contrast photographs.

== Purpose and research supported ==
This citizen science tool is free to use by researchers worldwide. Manta Matcher represents a global initiative to centralize manta ray sightings and facilitate research on these vulnerable species through collaborative studies, including the cross-referencing of regional databases.

Manta Matcher has already supported research that contributed to the listing of reef mantas (Manta alfredi) on Appendix 1 of the Convention on Migratory Species in November 2014.
