= Deep Sea Warrior (bathyscaphe) =

Chinese deep submergence vehicle

History

PRC
- Name: Deep Sea Warrior
- Awarded: CSIC
- Completed: 2016
- Acquired: 2016
- Commissioned: 2016
- Maiden voyage: 2017
- In service: 2016–
- Status: Active

Class overview
- Operators: People's Liberation Army Navy
- Preceded by: Jiaolong
- Succeeded by: Struggler
- Built: 2008–2016

General characteristics
- Displacement: 20 long tons (20 t)
- Length: 9.3 m (30 ft 6 in)
- Beam: 3 m (9 ft 10 in)
- Height: 4 m (13 ft 1 in)
- Propulsion: Fuel & lithium battery
- Speed: 2.5 kn (4.6 km/h; 2.9 mph)
- Endurance: 10 hours
- Complement: 3
- Sensors & processing systems: Various
- Electronic warfare & decoys: None
- Armament: None
- Armour: None
- Aircraft carried: None
- Aviation facilities: None

Deep Sea Warrior (Shen-Hai-Yong-Shi, or 深海勇士 in Chinese) bathyscaphe is a type of very little known deep-submergence vehicle built in the People’s Republic of China (PRC). Deep Sea Warrier was handed over from its builder China Shipbuilding Industry Corporation to its customer at the end of 2016, but actual deep diving did not begun until end of the following year due to preparation needed, because it was such as new product that thorough preparation was needed to ensure its safe operation, and bathyscaphe is capable of diving to a depth of 4500 meters.

In comparison to earlier Jiaolong where half of the components and technologies must be purchased abroad from foreign suppliers, 95% of technology and components of Deep Sea Warrier are domestically built and developed in China, with major subsystems including crew compartment, buoyancy material, lithium battery, propulsion system, deep water pump, mechanical arm, hydraulic system, acoustic communication system, control system and underwater positioning system have all successfully passed certification.

The general designer of Deep Sea Warrior is Mr. Hu Zhen (胡震), who has revealed that during the development of Deep Sea Warrior, the difficulties encountered was far greater than expected, particularly in the area of crew compartment design, buoyancy material, deep water pump, and propulsion system, so as a result, it took more than half a decade to complete the development of such subsystems, longer than originally planned three to four years. However, the delay in development is well worth it when measured in the advancement made, for example, the lithium battery has a live of five years and can be used for five hundred times, in comparison to the silver-zinc battery that can only be used for fifty times, resulting in overall cheaper operating cost of Deep Sea Warrior in comparison to earlier bathyscaphes using older technologies. The navigation and positioning system onboard can position Deep Sea Warrior to accuracy of less a meter. Currently, the motherships of Deep Sea Warrior are Chinese research vessel Explorer 1 (Tan-Suo 1, or 探索 – 号 in Chinese), and Explorer 2. Specification:

- Length: 9.3 m
- Beam: 3 m
- Height: 4 m
- Weight: 20 t
- Speed: 2.5 kt
- Payload: 220 kg
- Max diving depth: 4500 m
- Crew: 3
- Propulsion: Fuel & lithium battery
- Diameter of crew compartment: 2.1 m
- Endurance: 10 hours

Type	NATO designation	Classification	Pennant No.	Name (English)	Name (Han 中文)	Commissioned	Displacement	Status
Deep Sea Warrior	?	Bathyscaphe	Shen-Hai-Yong-Shi	Deep Sea Warrior	深海勇士	2016	20 t	Active

== See also ==
- Bathyscaphe
- Deep-submergence vehicle
- DSV Alvin
- DSV Shinkai 2000
- DSV Shinkai 6500
- Harmony
- Ictineu 3
- Jiaolong
- Konsul-class submersible
- Mir
- Nautile
- Pisces IV
- Pisces V
- Priz-class deep-submergence rescue vehicle
- Rainbowfish-class bathyscaphe
- Sea Pole-class bathyscaphe
- Striver (bathyscaphe)
