= Deep-submergence vehicle =

Self-propelled deep-diving crewed submersible

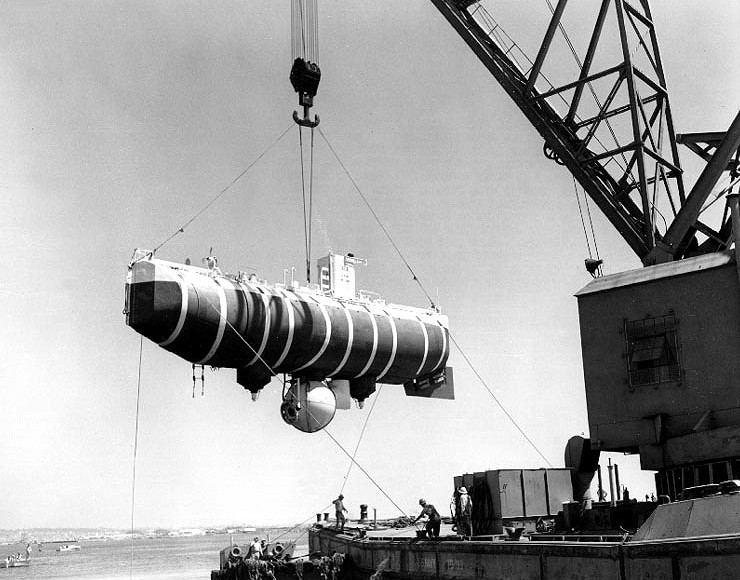
In 1960, Jacques Piccard and Don Walsh were the first people to explore the deepest part of the world's ocean, and the deepest location on the surface of the Earth's crust, in the bathyscaphe Trieste designed by Auguste Piccard.

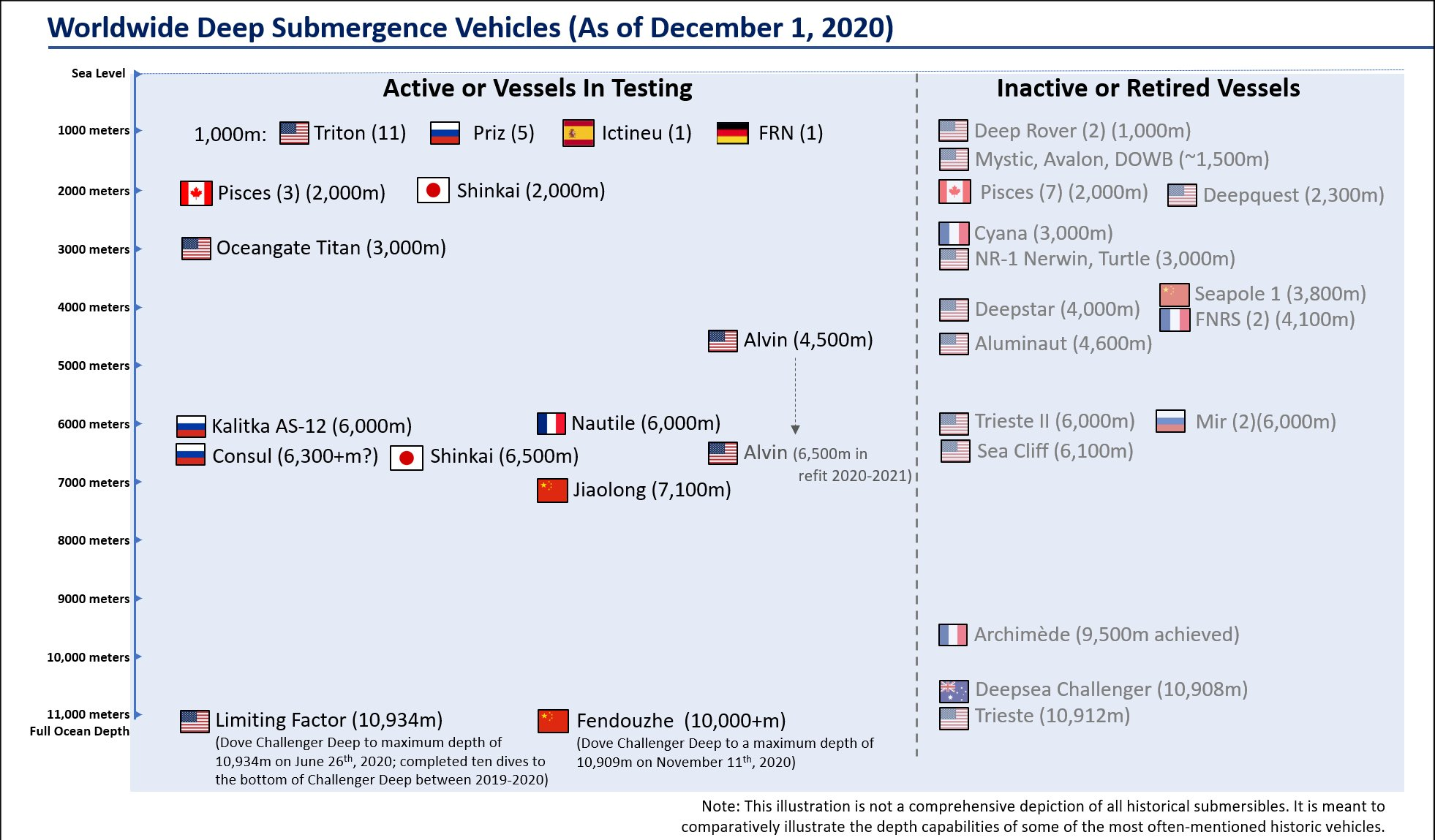
Historical deep-submergence vehicles

A deep-submergence vehicle (DSV) is a deep-diving crewed submersible that is self-propelled. Several navies operate vehicles that can be accurately described as DSVs. DSVs are commonly divided into two types: research DSVs, which are used for exploration and surveying, and DSRVs (deep-submergence rescue vehicles), which are intended to be used for rescuing the crew of a sunken navy submarine, clandestine (espionage) missions (primarily installing wiretaps on undersea communications cables), or both. DSRVs are equipped with docking chambers to allow personnel ingress and egress via a manhole.

Strictly speaking, bathyscaphes are not submarines because they have minimal mobility and are built like a balloon, using a habitable spherical pressure vessel hung under a liquid hydrocarbon filled float drum. In a DSV/DSRV, the passenger compartment and the ballast tank functionality is incorporated into a single structure to afford more habitable space (up to 24 people in the case of a DSRV).

Most DSV/DSRV vehicles are powered by traditional electric battery propulsion and have very limited endurance, while a few (like NR-1 or AS-12/31) are/were nuclear-powered, and could sustain much longer missions. Plans have been made to equip DSVs with LOX Stirling engines, but none have been realized so far due to cost and maintenance considerations. All DSVs to date (2023) are dependent on a surface support ship or a mother submarine that can piggyback or tow them (in case of the NR-1) to the scene of operations. Some DSRV vessels are air transportable in very large military cargo planes to speed up deployment in case of emergency rescue missions.

== List of deep submergence vehicles ==
=== Trieste-class bathyscaphes ===
FNRS-2
The first bathyscaphe, developed by Swiss engineer Auguste Piccard and named after the Belgian Fonds National de la Recherche Scientifique (FNRS), the funding organization for the venture. FNRS also funded the FNRS-1, a balloon that set a world altitude record, also built by Piccard. This bathyscaphe consisted of a gasoline filled float, 22 feet long and 10 feet wide, and oval shaped. Gasoline being less dense than water, would provide buoyancy for when the bathyscaphe needed to rise to the surface. The ovular float was divided into six tanks for holding gasoline, having a combined total of 6,600 gallons.

FNRS-3
After damage to the FNRS-2 during its sea trials in 1948, the FNRS ran out of funding and the submersible was sold to the French Navy in 1950. It was subsequently substantially rebuilt and improved at Toulon naval base, and renamed FNRS-3. It was relaunched in 1953 under the command of Georges Houot, a French naval officer.

DSV-0 Trieste
The X-1 Trieste bathyscaphe has reached Challenger Deep, the world's deepest seabed. It was retired in 1966.

DSV-1 X-2 Trieste II
An updated bathyscaphe design, it participated in clandestine missions. Trieste II was retired in 1984.

=== Alvin-class submersibles ===
Originally designed for 6,000 ft (1,800 m) operation, and initially built to a similar design, Alvin and her sister submersibles have been subsequently, independently upgraded. Utilizing syntactic foam, these submersibles were more compact and maneuverable than earlier bathyscaphes like Trieste, although not as deep diving.

DSV-2 Alvin
Launched in June 1964 with an initial depth capability of 6,000 ft (1,800 m); rebuilt in 1973 to 4,500 m (14,800 ft). Owned by the United States Navy and operated under secondment by the Woods Hole Oceanographic Institution (WHOI) where it conducts science-oriented missions funded by the National Science Foundation (NSF), National Oceanic and Atmospheric Administration (NOAA) and the Office of Naval Research (ONR). Alvin operates from R/V Atlantis, an AGOR-23 class vessel owned by the ONR and operated by WHOI under a charter party agreement. In 2004, the National Science Foundation funded a 6,500 m (21,300 ft) capable replacement for Alvin, however the key components, such as a new titanium personnel hull, and funding were used to substantially rebuild Alvin in 2011 and 2020 instead. In 2022, Alvin was certified for 6,500 m operations.
DSV-3 Turtle
Alvin's identical sibling, launched in December 1968 and retired 1998. Owned and operated by the United States Navy.
DSV-4 Sea Cliff
Another Alvin-class DSV sub, launched in December 1968, retired in 1998, and returned to active service in September 2002. Since 1981, Sea Cliff has a depth capability of 6,000 m (20,000 ft), and is owned and operated by the United States Navy.
DSV-5 Nemo
Another Alvin-class DSV sub, launched in June 1970 and retired in 1998. Owned and operated by the United States Navy.

=== Star-class DSV ===
Star II
Star III

Both Star II and Star III were built by General Dynamics Electric Boat Division in Groton, Connecticut. Both were launched on May 3, 1966, and were used for civilian research.

=== NR-1–class DSVN ===
NR-1
a decommissioned US Navy nuclear powered research and clandestine DSV submarine, which could roll on the seabed using large balloon wheels.

=== Aluminaut ===
Aluminaut
a DSV made completely of aluminum by the Reynolds Metals Aluminum Company, for the US Navy, once held the submarine deep diving record. It is no longer operational.

=== Deepsea Challenger ===
Deepsea Challenger
a DSV made by the Acheron Project Pty Ltd, has reached Challenger Deep, the world's deepest seabed.

=== Limiting Factor ===
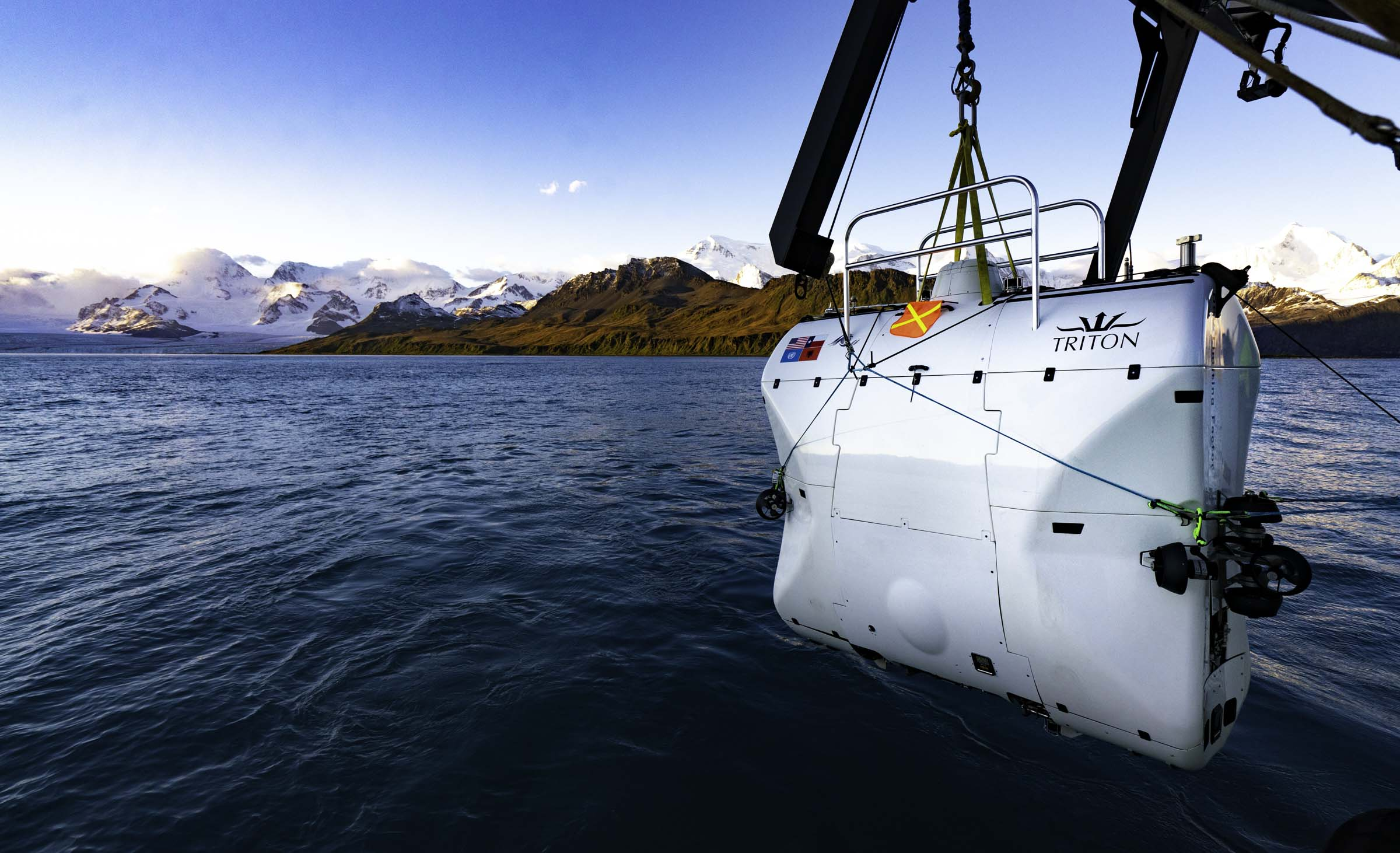
DSV Limiting Factor of Triton Submarines during sea trials

A submersible commissioned by Caladan Oceanic and designed and built by Triton Submarines of Sebastian, Florida. On December 19, 2018, it was the first crewed submersible to reach the bottom of the Atlantic Ocean, or 8,376 meters in the Brownson Deep, thus making it the deepest diving, currently operational submersible. In August 2019, the submersible and its pilot, Victor Vescovo, completed the "Five Deeps Expedition" with its support ship, the DSSV Pressure Drop, becoming the first submersible to visit the bottom of all five of the world's oceans. Earlier that same month, a team of explorers and scientists used Limiting Factor to visit the wreck of the RMS Titanic in the North Atlantic Ocean. On March 31, 2021, Caladan Oceanic announced having re-located, surveyed, and filmed the wreck of the World War II destroyer USS Johnston, sunk on October 25, 1944, in the Battle off Samar (in the Philippine Sea off Samar Island). Johnston lies at depth of 21,180 ft (6,460 m), making Limiting Factor's expedition the deepest wreck dive in history.

=== Priz-class DSRV ===
Priz
a DSRV class of five ships built by the USSR and Russia. The titanium-hulled Priz class are capable of diving to 1,000 metres (0.62 mi). These mini-submarines can ferry up to 20 people for very brief periods of time (in case of a rescue mission) or operate submerged for two to three days with a regular crew of three to four specialists. In early 2005, the Russian AS-28 Priz vessel was trapped undersea and subsequently freed by a British ROV in a successful international rescue effort.

=== Mir ===
Mir
a strictly civilian (research) class of two DSVs which were manufactured in Finland for the USSR. These bathyscaphe-derived vessels can carry three people down to depths of 6,000 metres (3.7 mi). After visiting and filming the RMS Titanic's wreck, the two Mir submersibles and their support ship were loaned to a US Pacific trench surveying mission in the late 1990s and made important discoveries concerning sulphuric based life in "black smokers".

=== Kalitka-class DSVN ===
AS-12
a Russian counterpart to the American NR-1 clandestine nuclear DSV, is a relatively large, deep-diving nuclear submarine of 2,000 tons submerged displacement that is intended for oceanographic research and clandestine missions. It has a titanium pressure hull consisting of several conjoined spheres and able to withstand tremendous pressure — during the 2012 research mission it routinely dove to 2,500 to 3,000 metres (1.6 to 1.9 mi), with maximum depth being said to be approximately 6,000 metres (3.7 mi). Despite the three-month mission time allowed by its nuclear reactor and ample food stores it usually operates in conjunction with a specialized tender, a refurbished Delta III-class submarine BS-136 Orenburg, which has its missile shafts removed and fitted with a special docking cradle on its bottom.

=== Konsul-class DSV ===
Konsul
a class of Russian military DSVs currently deployed onboard the Russian oceanographic research ship Yantar. It is reported that the submersible and its sister sub Rus are used to conduct seafloor surveillance of marine communications cables and western underwater surveillance devices. They are somewhat smaller than the Mir's, accommodating a crew of two instead of three, but are purely domestically produced vessels and have a higher maximum depth due to their titanium pressure hulls: during the tests the original Konsul dove to 6,270 metres (3.90 mi).

=== Nautile ===
Nautile
a DSV owned by Ifremer, the French Research Institute for Exploitation of the Sea. The titanium-hulled Nautile is capable of diving to 6,000 metres (3.7 mi).

=== Shinkai ===
DSV Shinkai
JAMSTEC (Japan Agency for Marine-Earth Science and Technology) operated a DSV series called Shinkai ("Deep Sea"). The latest DSV is Shinkai 6500 which could submerge to 6,500 metres (4.0 mi) with three crew members. JAMSTEC was operating a ROV called Kaikō, which was able to submerge to 11,000 metres (6.8 mi), but was lost at sea in May 2003.

=== Pisces-class DSV ===
Pisces-class DSV
three-person research submersibles built by International Hydrodynamics of Vancouver in British Columbia with a maximum operating depth of 2,000 metres (1.2 mi) capable of dive durations of 7 to 10 hours. A total of 10 were built and are representative of late 1960s deep-ocean submersible design. Two (Pisces IV and Pisces V) are currently operated by National Oceanic and Atmospheric Administration and the first production vehicle is on display in Vancouver. Pisces VI is active and operating from Tenerife, in the Canary Islands.

=== Sea Pole-class bathyscaphe ===
Bathyscaphe series designed by the People's Republic of China, and there are three derivatives known to exist by 2010:

Sea Pole-class bathyscaphe
1 built, 2nd unit developed into Jiaolong (Described below)
Jiaolong-class bathyscaphe
Subclass of Sea Pole class, 1 built.
Harmony-class bathyscaphe
Subclass of Jiaolong class, 1 built.

=== Fendouzhe DSV ===
Fendouzhe, or Striver-class
a Chinese DSV that dove to an estimated depth of 10,909 meters in the Mariana Trench on November 10, 2020, the deepest ever for a Chinese submersible. It was supported by its mother ship, the Tansuo-1 (Exploration-1) and its development began in 2016. The chief designer of the sub, Liu Yeyao, and two other Chinese oceanauts made the descent in what was the first three-person, welded titanium capsule to venture to full ocean depth.

=== Deep Sea Warrior bathyscaphe ===
Deep sea warrior or "Shen-Hai Yong-Shi"
developed by China Shipbuilding Industry Corporation in 2017 and capable of diving up to a depth of 4,500 meters.

=== Ictineu 3 ===
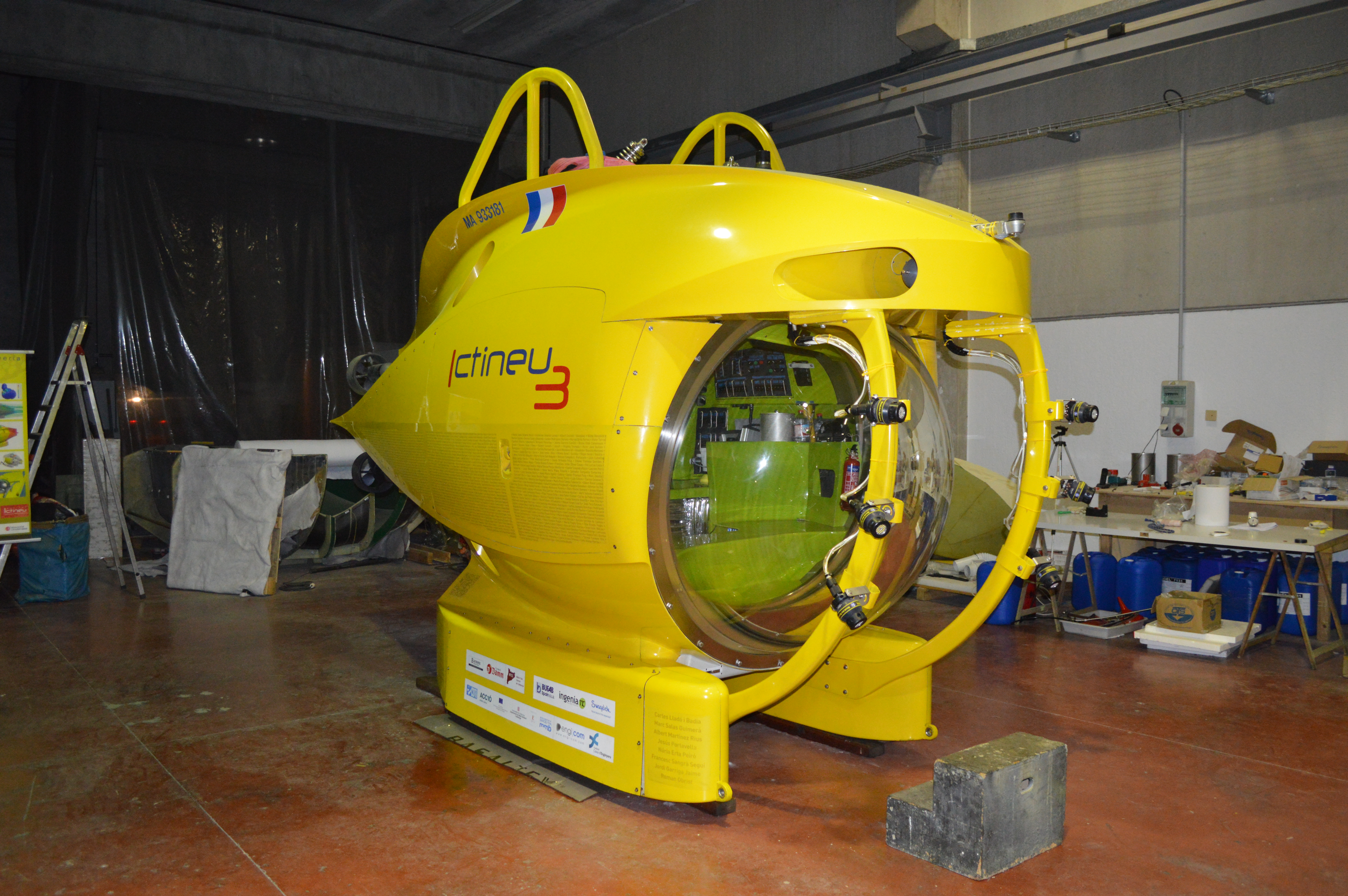
Ictineu 3 inside a warehouse in Sant Feliu de Llobregat, Catalonia, Spain.

Ictineu 3
a three-person crewed DSV. The hull is made of inox steel and it has a large 1,200-millimetre-diameter (47 in) semi-spheric acrylic glass viewport. It is designed to reach depths of 1,200 metres (3,900 ft), thus being the ninth-deepest submersible, and it is capable of diving during 10 hours using li-ion batteries.

=== Matsya 6000 ===
Matsya 6000 DSV
an Indian under-development crewed deep-submergence vehicle intended to be utilised for deep sea exploration of rare minerals in the Indian Ocean. It is capable of diving down to a depth of 6,000 m. First uncrewed trial was conducted on 27 October 2021 where the 'personnel sphere' was lowered to a depth of 600 m, off the coast of Chennai.

=== Titan ===
Titan

Titan, previously called Cyclops 2, was an experimental submersible that imploded while transporting tourists to visit the wreckage of the Titanic in 2023. The submersible was created and operated by OceanGate. It was the first privately owned submersible with a claimed maximum depth of 4,000 m (13,000 ft), and the first completed crewed submersible with a hull constructed of titanium and carbon fiber composite materials.

After testing with dives to its maximum intended depth in 2018 and 2019, the original composite hull of Titan developed fatigue damage and was replaced by 2021. In that year, OceanGate began transporting paying customers to the wreck of the Titanic, completing several dives to the wreck site in 2021 and 2022.

On June 18, 2023, Titan imploded during a dive to the Titanic. All five occupants of the submersible were killed. OceanGate had lost contact with Titan and contacted authorities later that day after the submersible was overdue for return. A massive international search and rescue operation ensued and ended on June 22, when debris from Titan was discovered about 1,600 feet (500 metres) from the bow of the Titanic.

=== Other DSV bathyscaphes ===
Bathyscaphe Archimède
French-made bathyscaphe, operated around the time of the Trieste.
FNRS-4

== Deepest explorers ==
1. (United States) DSV Limiting Factor – 11,000 m
2. (Switzerland) Bathyscaphe Trieste – 11,000 m
3. (Australia) Deepsea Challenger – 11,000 m
4. (China) Fendouzhe – 11,000 m
5. (France) Archimède – 9,500 m
6. (China) Jiaolong – 7,000 m
7. (Japan) DSV Shinkai 6500 – 6,500 m
8. (Russia) Konsul – 6,500 m
9. (United States) DSV Alvin – 6,500 m
10. (United States) DSV Sea Cliff – 6,000m
11. (Russia) MIR – 6,000 m
12. (France) Nautile – 6,000 m
- Figures rounded to nearest 500 metres
