= DSV Shinkai =

Crewed research submersible

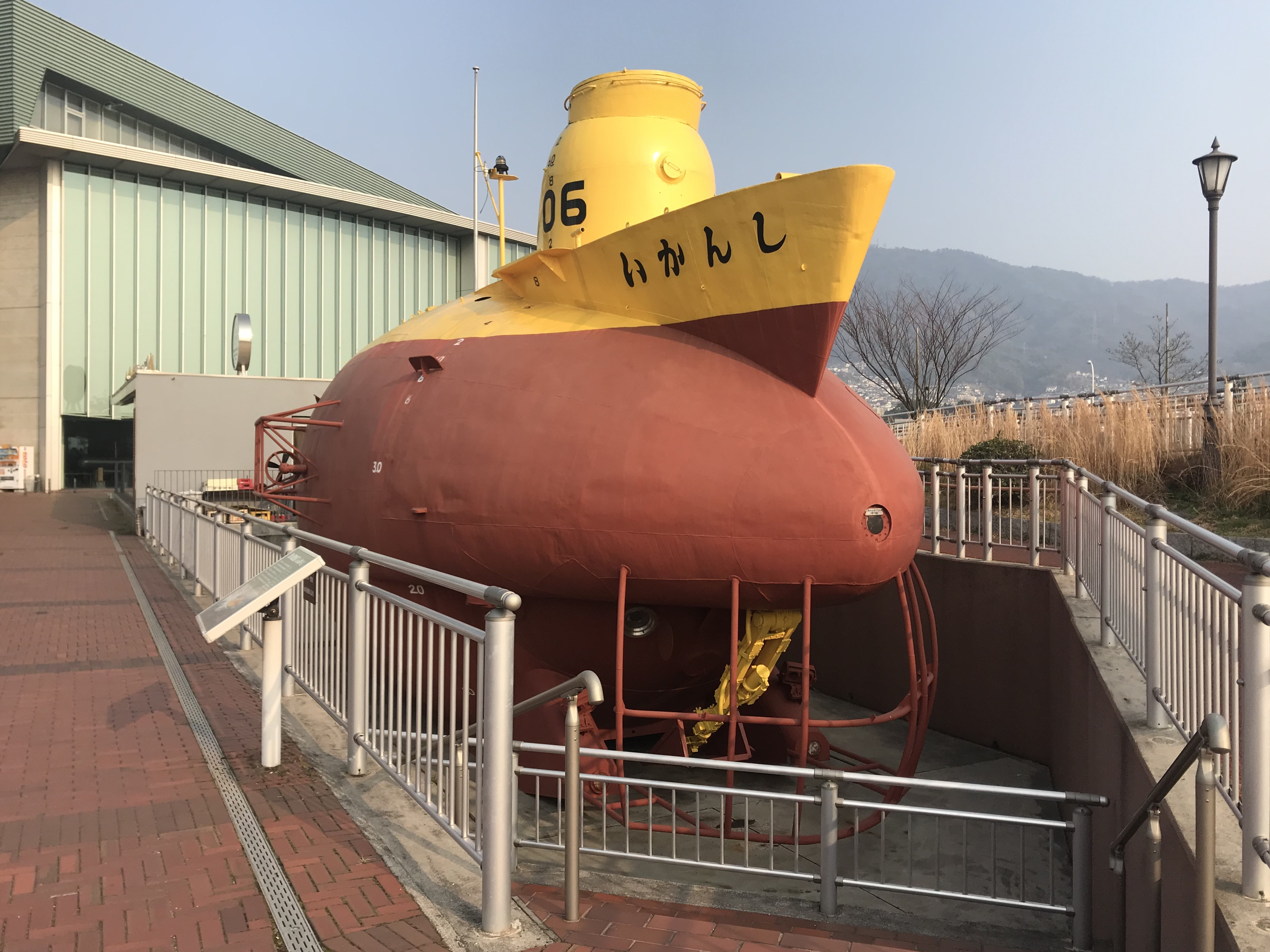
- Shinnkai

History

Japan
- Name: Shinkai
- Builder: Kawasaki Heavy Industries Kobe shipyard
- Laid down: 1968
- Launched: 1970
- Sponsored by: Japan Coast Guard
- Completed: 1970
- Acquired: 1970
- Commissioned: 1970
- Decommissioned: 1977
- Maiden voyage: 1970
- In service: 1970
- Out of service: 1976
- Status: Preserved at Kure Maritime Museum

General characteristics
- Type: Deep-submergence vehicle
- Tonnage: 100 tons (Dry weight)
- Length: 15.3 m (50 ft)
- Beam: 5.5 m (18 ft)
- Draft: 4.0 m (13.1 ft)
- Installed power: 50 100 v, 2,000 amp-hour, externally mounted lead-acid batteries
- Propulsion: 1 main 11 kW electric, 680—3,200 rpm, reversible for horizontal; 2 port/starboard 2.2 kW electric, reversible, 360° rotating for vertical
- Speed: 1.5 knots (2.8 km/h; 1.7 mph) 10 hours; 3.5 knots (6.5 km/h; 4.0 mph) 3 hours
- Endurance: 192 man hours maximum life support
- Test depth: 600 m (2,000 ft); 1,500 m (4,900 ft) (Collapse depth)
- Complement: 2 Pilots; 2 Observers
- Notes: Underwater telephone (UQC), radio, gyrocompass, speed indicator, depth gauge, echosounder, seismic profiling, obstacle avoidance sonar, transponder, stereo camera, TV, salinometer, water and bottom samplers, water temperature and light sensors, current meter, magnetic, gravity and sound speed measurements, and radiometer. One manipulator arm.

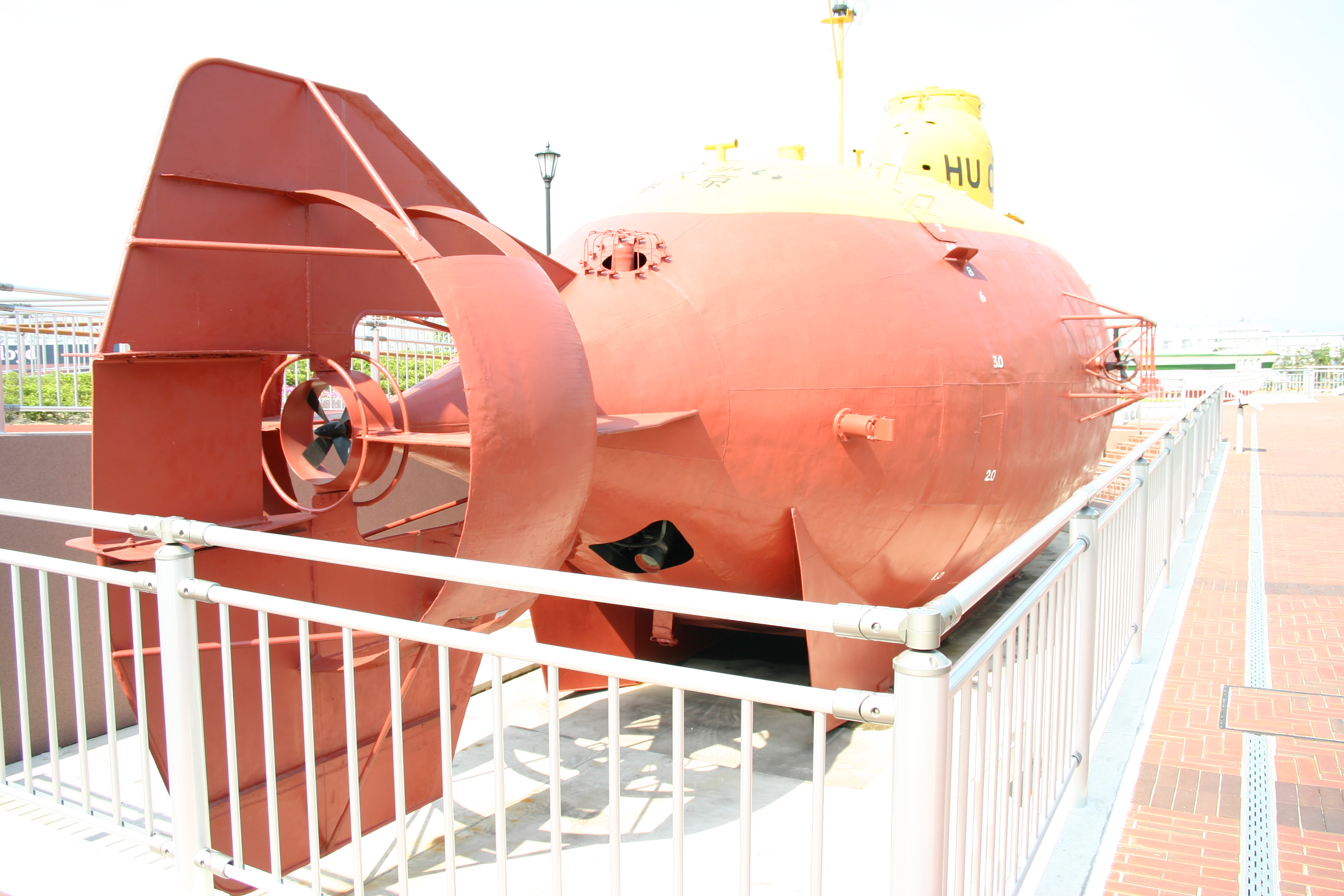
Rear view of Shinkai

The Shinkai (しんかい) was a crewed research submersible that could dive up to a depth of 600 m. It was completed in 1970, and until 1981 it had the greatest depth range of any crewed research vehicle in Japan. The Shinkai is owned and run by the Japan Coast Guard and it is launched from the support vessel Otomemaru (乙女丸).

Two 4.0 m (13.1 ft) diameter, 3.6 cm (1.4 in) thick high-strength low-alloy steel pressure hulls connected by a 1.45 m (4.8 ft) tunnel. Pilots and observers are housed in the forward hull with mechanical and power supplies in aft hull. A 1.7 m (5.6 ft) escape sphere was mounted on the forward hull. Access was through four 500 mm (20 in) hatches with one 600 mm (24 in) emergency escape hatch. Five view ports with 90° viewing angle in the forward sphere, three 120 mm (4.7 in) inside diameter for forward viewing and one 50 mm (2.0 in) inside diameter on each side.

== See also ==
- DSV Shinkai 2000 – Japanese crewed research submersible
- DSV Shinkai 6500 – Japanese crewed research submersible
- Archimède – French Navy bathyscaphe
- FNRS-2 – First bathyscaphe
- FNRS-3 – Bathyscaphe of the French Navy
- Bathyscaphe – Free-diving self-propelled deep-sea submersible
- Deepsea Challenger – Submersible that traveled to the Challenger Deep
