= Striver (bathyscaphe) =

Chinese deep submergence vehicle

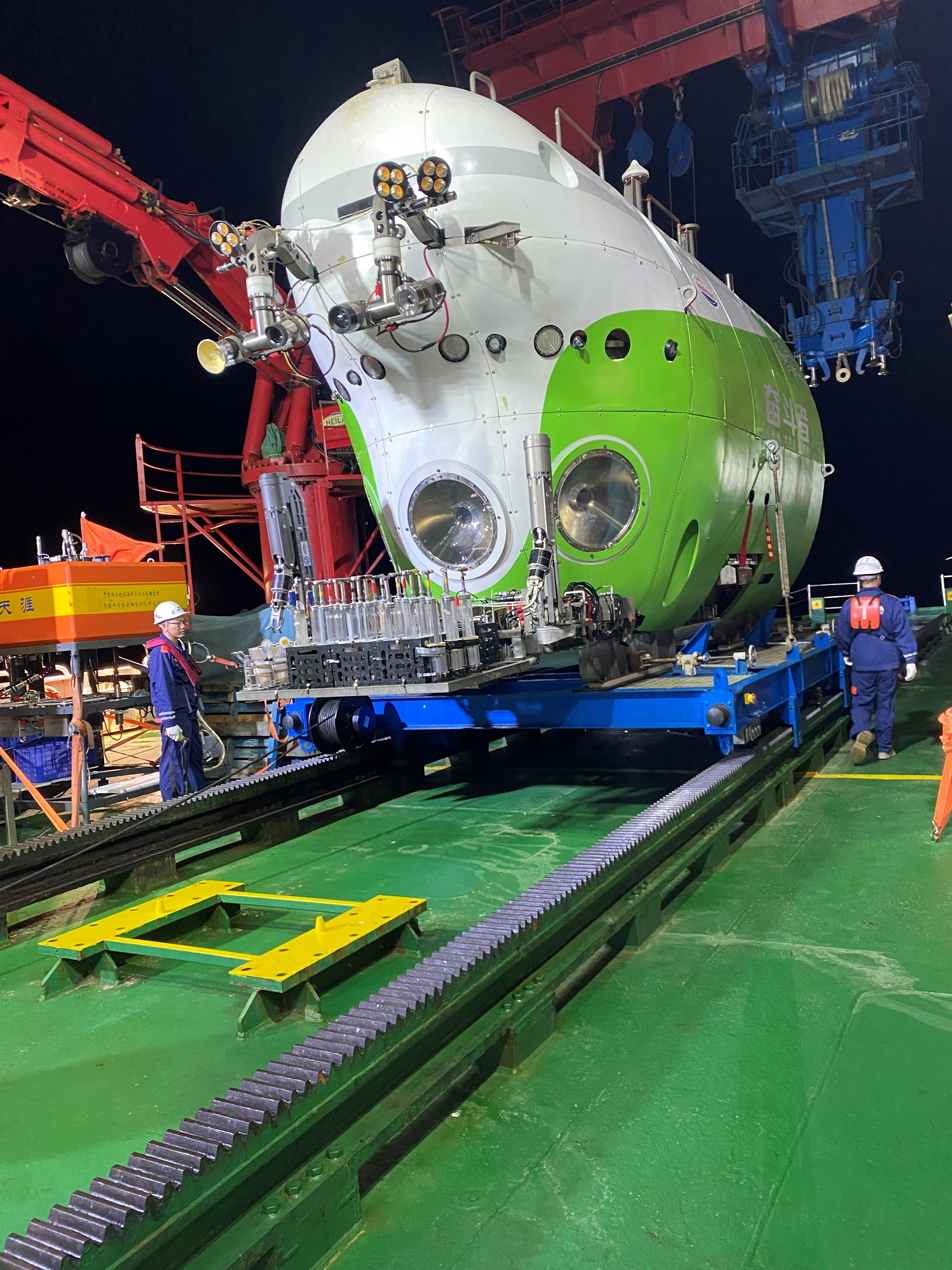
- Fendouzhe aboard its mother ship Tan Suo Yi Hao

History

PRC
- Name: Striver
- Awarded: CSSC
- Completed: 2020
- Status: Active

Class overview
- Operators: Institute of Deep-sea Science and Engineering as part of the Chinese Academy of Sciences
- Preceded by: Deep Sea Warrior

General characteristics
- Displacement: 36 long tons (37 t)
- Endurance: 6 hours
- Complement: 3

Striver (Fèndòuzhě; Chinese: 奋斗者) bathyscaphe is a type of deep-submergence vehicle built in the People's Republic of China (PRC). It was built by China State Shipbuilding Corporation (CSSC). It can accommodate three crew members, and is designed to reach depths of more than 10,000 meters. Striver is equipped with two mechanical arms, seven underwater cameras, seven sonars, hydraulic drills, and other scientific devices. On 10 November 2020, the bottom of the Challenger Deep was reached by Striver with three Chinese scientists (Zhang Wei, Zhao Yang, and Wang Zhiqiang) onboard whilst livestreaming the descent to a reported depth of 10,909 m (35,791 ft).

In comparison to the earlier Deep Sea Warrior bathyscaphe, Striver can dive more than twice as deep, and in comparison to the ten-hour endurance of Deep Sea Warrior, Striver can endure six hours. Striver can dive and surface much faster, and its crew compartment is built of titanium alloy Ti62A, specially developed for use on Striver. It is equipped with cameras made by the Norwegian manufacturer Imenco. The designer is Ye Cong. The mechanical arms of Striver were developed by Shenyang Institute of Automation, and each is capable of handling 60 kg of weight. The motherships of the Striver bathyscaphe are the same ones used for Deep Sea Warrior bathyscaphe: Chinese research vessel Explorer 1 (探索一号) and Explorer 2.

Her specifications are:

- Weight: 36 tons
- Crew: 3 people
- Payload: 240 kg
- Endurance: 6 hours

In 2024, researchers aboard Striver discovered thousands of worms and mollusks during 23 expeditions to the Mariana Trench. Observed at depths ranging from 8,200 ft (2,499 m) to 31,000 ft (9,449 m) deep, these are the deepest colonies documented.

In July 2025, Striver and Jiaolong explored the Arctic Ocean in a joint deep-diving mission. With sea ice coverage of over 80%, these two vessels participated in the world's first human deep-sea exploration of the Gakkel Ridge, reaching a depth of 5,277 meters.

Data collected during a 2023 expedition were reported in June 2026, when researchers announced the discovery of the deepest and most extensive known whale graveyard in the Diamantina Fracture Zone. Using Striver, the team documented 476 fossil cetacean localities and numerous modern whale remains at depths exceeding 7,000 m (23,000 ft), with evidence that whale falls had accumulated in the region for at least 5.3 million years.
