= DSV Alvin =

Crewed deep-ocean research submersible

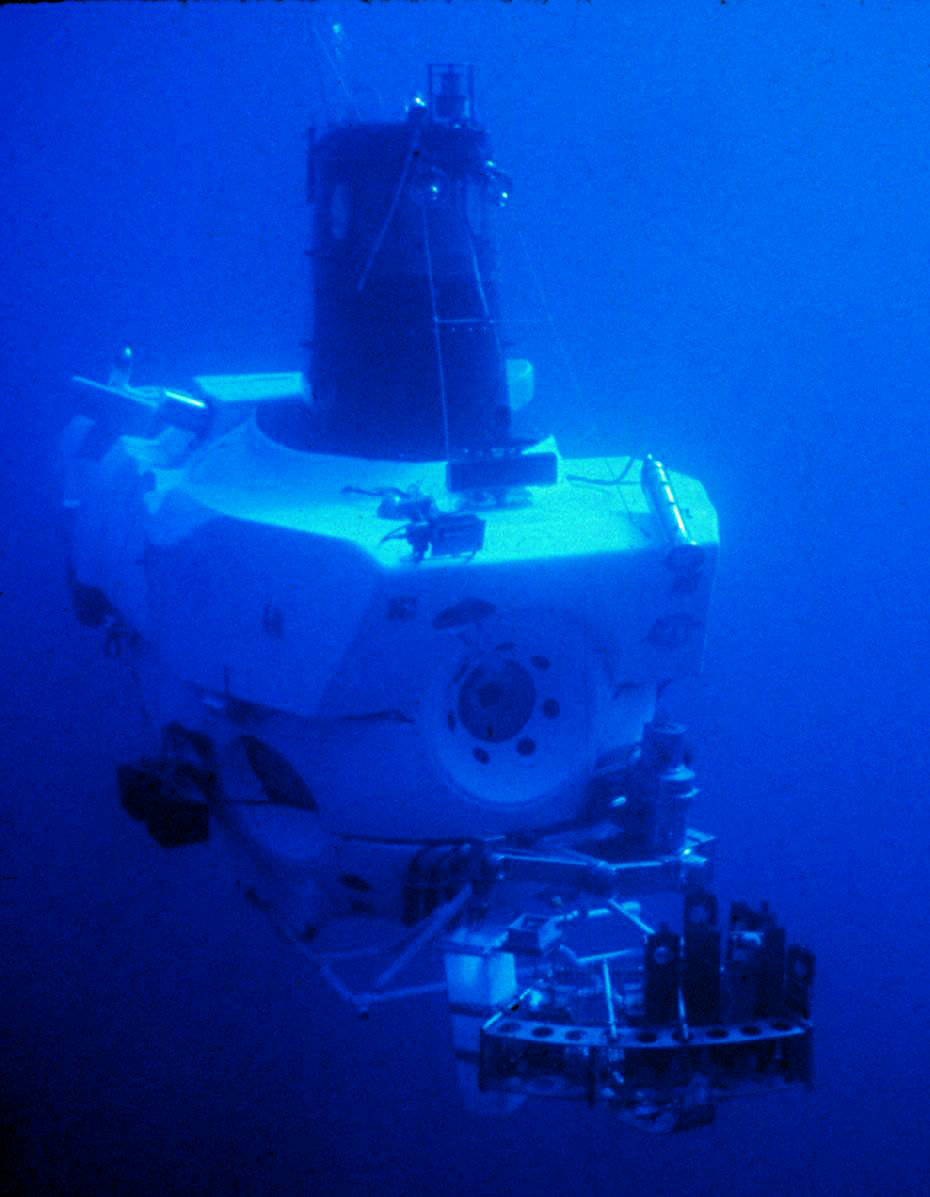
- Alvin in 1978, a year after first exploring hydrothermal vents. The rack hanging at the bow holds sample containers.

History

United States
- Name: Alvin
- Namesake: Allyn Vine
- Operator: Woods Hole Oceanographic Institution
- Builder: General Mills' Electronics Group
- Acquired: May 26, 1964
- In service: June 5, 1964
- Status: in active service, as of 2026

General characteristics
- Type: Deep-submergence vehicle
- Displacement: 17 t (17 long tons)
- Length: 7.1 m (23 ft 4 in)
- Beam: 2.6 m (8 ft 6 in)
- Height: 3.7 m (12 ft 2 in)
- Draft: 2.3 m (7 ft 7 in)
- Speed: 2 knots (3.7 km/h; 2.3 mph)
- Range: 5 km (3.1 mi)
- Endurance: 72 hours with 3 crew
- Test depth: 6,500 m (21,300 ft)
- Capacity: 680 kg (1,500 lb) payload
- Crew: 3 (1 pilot, 2 scientific observers)

Alvin (DSV-2) is a crewed deep-ocean research submersible owned by the United States Navy and operated by the Woods Hole Oceanographic Institution (WHOI) of Woods Hole, Massachusetts. The original vehicle was built by General Mills' Electronics Group in Minneapolis, Minnesota. Named to honor the prime mover and creative inspiration for the vehicle, Allyn Vine, Alvin was commissioned on June 5, 1964.

The submersible is launched from the deep submergence support vessel RV Atlantis (AGOR-25), which is also owned by the U.S. Navy and operated by WHOI. The submersible has made more than 5,200 dives, carrying two scientists and a pilot, observing the lifeforms that must cope with super-pressures and move about in total darkness, as well as exploring the wreck of Titanic. Research conducted by Alvin has been featured in nearly 2,000 scientific papers.

== Design ==
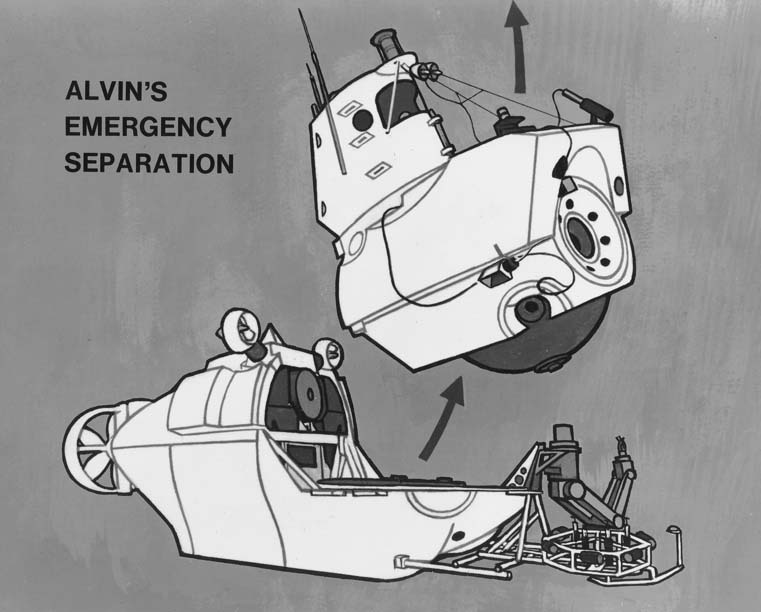
Emergency separation

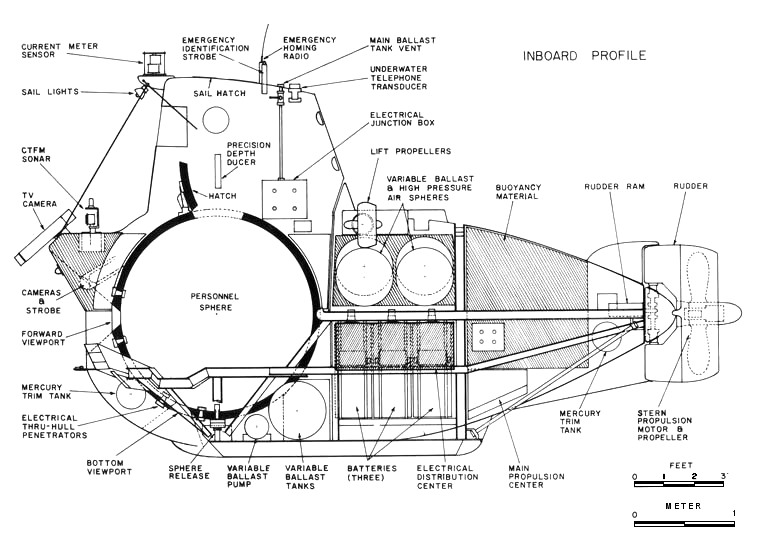
General layout

Alvin was designed as a replacement for bathyscaphes and other less maneuverable oceanographic vehicles. Its more nimble design was made possible in part by the development of syntactic foam, which is buoyant and yet strong enough to serve as a structural material at great depths.

The vessel weighs 17 tons. It allows for two scientists and one pilot to dive for up to nine hours at 6,500 metres (21,300 ft). The submersible features two robotic arms and can be fitted with mission-specific sampling and experimental gear. The plug hatch of the vessel is 0.48 m (1 ft 7 in) in diameter and somewhat thicker than the 2-inch (51 mm) thick titanium sphere pressure hull; it is held in place by the pressure of the water above it.

In an emergency, if previous versions of Alvin were stuck underwater with occupants inside, an upper part of the submersible including the titanium sphere could be released using controls inside the hull. This would then rise to the surface uncontrolled. The current version of the vehicle uses releasable weights and emergency releases on jettisonable equipment.

Harold E. Froehlich was one of the principal designers of Alvin.

== History ==
=== Early career ===
Alvin, first of its ship class of deep submergence vehicle (DSV), was built to dive to 2,440 metres (8,010 ft). Each of the Alvin-class DSVs have different depth capabilities. However, Alvin is the only one seconded to the National Oceanic and Atmospheric Administration (NOAA), with the others staying with the United States Navy.

Alvin's first deep sea tests took place off Andros Island, the Bahamas, where it made a successful 12-hour, uncrewed tethered 7,500-foot (2,300 m) test dive. On July 20, 1965 Alvin made its first 6,000-foot (1,800 m) crewed dive for the Navy to obtain certification. On March 17, 1966, Alvin was used to locate a submerged 1.45-megaton hydrogen bomb lost in a United States Air Force midair accident over Palomares, Spain. The bomb, found resting on a steep slope nearly 2,500 ft (760 m) deep, was located by Alvin but the submersible had difficulty raising it up, initially causing it to fall deeper to 2,800 ft (850 m). The bomb was eventually raised intact on April 7 by a Navy CURV-I and the experience gained by the Alvin crew's 34 dives with over 220 hours logged led to new improvements to the vehicle's navigations systems. On July 6, 1967, the Alvin was attacked by a swordfish during dive 202. The swordfish became trapped in the Alvin's skin. The attack took place at 2,000 feet (610 m) below the surface. The fish was recovered at the surface and cooked for dinner. During Dive 209, on September 24, 1968, Alvin found an F6F Hellcat, #42782, 125 miles southeast of Nantucket. The aircraft had ditched September 30, 1944, during carrier qualifications, with the pilot surviving.

=== Sinking ===
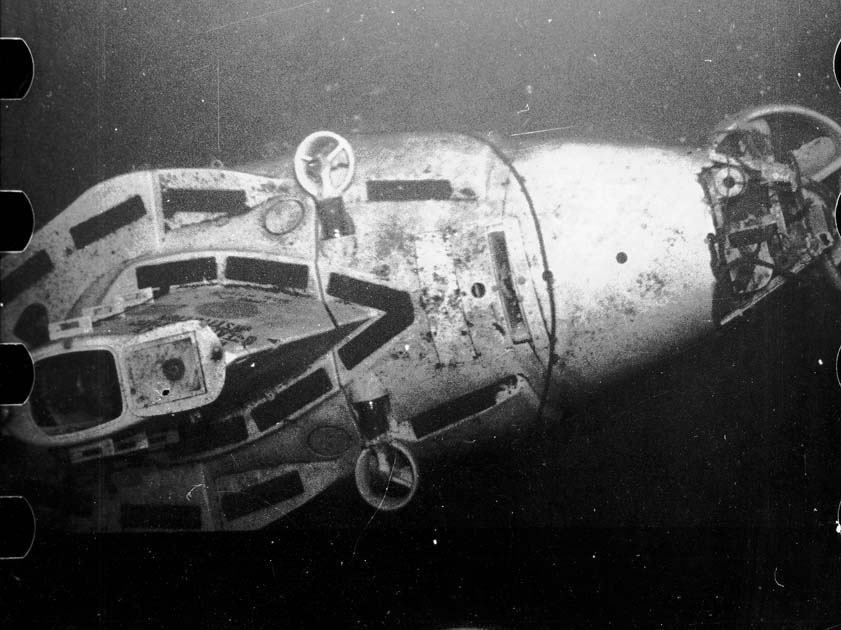
The sunken Alvin on the ocean bottom in June 1969, photographed by USNS Mizar (T-AGOR-11)

Alvin, aboard the Navy tender ship Lulu, was lost as it was being transported on October 26, 1968. Lulu, a vessel created from a pair of decommissioned U.S. Navy pontoon boats with a support structure added on, was lowering Alvin over the side when two steel cables snapped. There were three crew members aboard Alvin at the time, and the hatch was open. Situated between the pontoons with no deck underneath, Alvin entered the water and rapidly began to sink. The three crew members managed to escape, but Alvin flooded and sank in 1,500 m (4,900 ft) of water in the Atlantic Ocean at approximately 39°53′30″N 069°15′30″W, about 88 nautical miles (101 mi; 163 km) south of Nantucket Island.

Severe weather prevented the recovery of Alvin throughout late 1968, but it was photographed at the bottom of the Atlantic Ocean in June 1969 by a sled towed by USS Mizar. Alvin was found to be upright and appeared intact except for damage to the stern. It was decided to attempt recovery; although no object of Alvin's size had ever been recovered from a depth of 5,000 feet (1,500 m), recovery was "deemed to be within the state of the art". In August 1969, the Aluminaut, a DSV built by Reynolds Metals Company, descended to Alvin but had trouble attaching the required lines, and side effects from Hurricane Camille were producing worsening weather, causing the team to return to Woods Hole to regroup. The second attempt started on August 27, and Aluminaut was able to secure a line and safety slings to Alvin and wrap a nylon net around its hull, allowing it to be hauled up by Mizar. Alvin was towed, submerged at 40 feet (12 m), at a speed of 2 knots (3.7 km/h), back to Woods Hole.

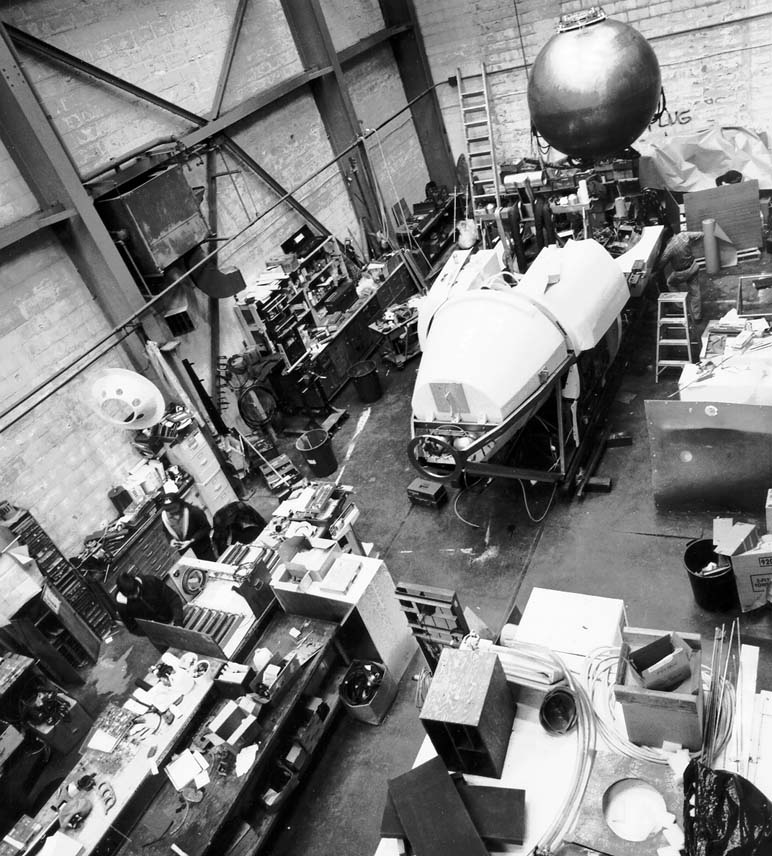
Alvin during refit of the personnel sphere, 1974

=== Mid-Atlantic Ridge ===
With a new, stronger pressure hull Alvin could now reach the floor of the rift valley of this seafloor spreading center. In the summer of 1974 American and French scientists joined in Project FAMOUS to explore the creation of new sea floor at this spreading center. The French provided submersibles Archimède and CYANA. A total of forty-four dives were completed that succeeded in defining the crustal accretion zone in the floor of the rift valley.

=== Hydrothermal vents ===
Marine geologists using Alvin in the Pacific Ocean discovered deep-sea hydrothermal vents and associated biologic communities during two expeditions to ocean spreading centers. In 1977 scientists in Alvin discovered low temperature (~20 °C) vents on the Galapagos spreading center east of those same islands. During the RISE expedition in 1979 scientists using Alvin discovered high temperature vents (380 °C) popularly known as 'black smokers' on the crest of the East Pacific Rise at 21° N. These discoveries revealed deep-sea ecosystems that exist without sunlight and are based on chemosynthesis.

=== Exploration of RMS Titanic ===
Alvin was involved in the exploration of the wreckage of RMS Titanic in 1986. Launched from her support ship RV Atlantis II, she carried Dr. Robert Ballard and two companions to the wreckage of the White Star Liner Titanic, which sank in 1912 after striking an iceberg while crossing the North Atlantic Ocean on her maiden voyage.

During twelve dives in July 1986, Alvin, accompanied by a small remotely operated vehicle (ROV) named Jason Jr. that the expedition was testing, conducted detailed photographic surveys and inspections of Titanic's wreckage. Many of the photographs of the expedition have been published in the magazine of the National Geographic Society, which was a major sponsor of the expedition.

The Woods Hole Oceanographic Institution team involved in the Titanic expedition also explored the wreck of the USS Scorpion (SSN-589), a Skipjack-class submarine armed with nuclear torpedoes, which sank off the coast of the Azores in 1968 in uncertain circumstances. Alvin surveyed the wreck site in August 1986 and photographed the remains of Scorpion.

=== Deepwater Horizon ===
In March and April 2014, Alvin was used to explore the site of the 2010 Deepwater Horizon oil spill.

== Overhauls and Improvements ==
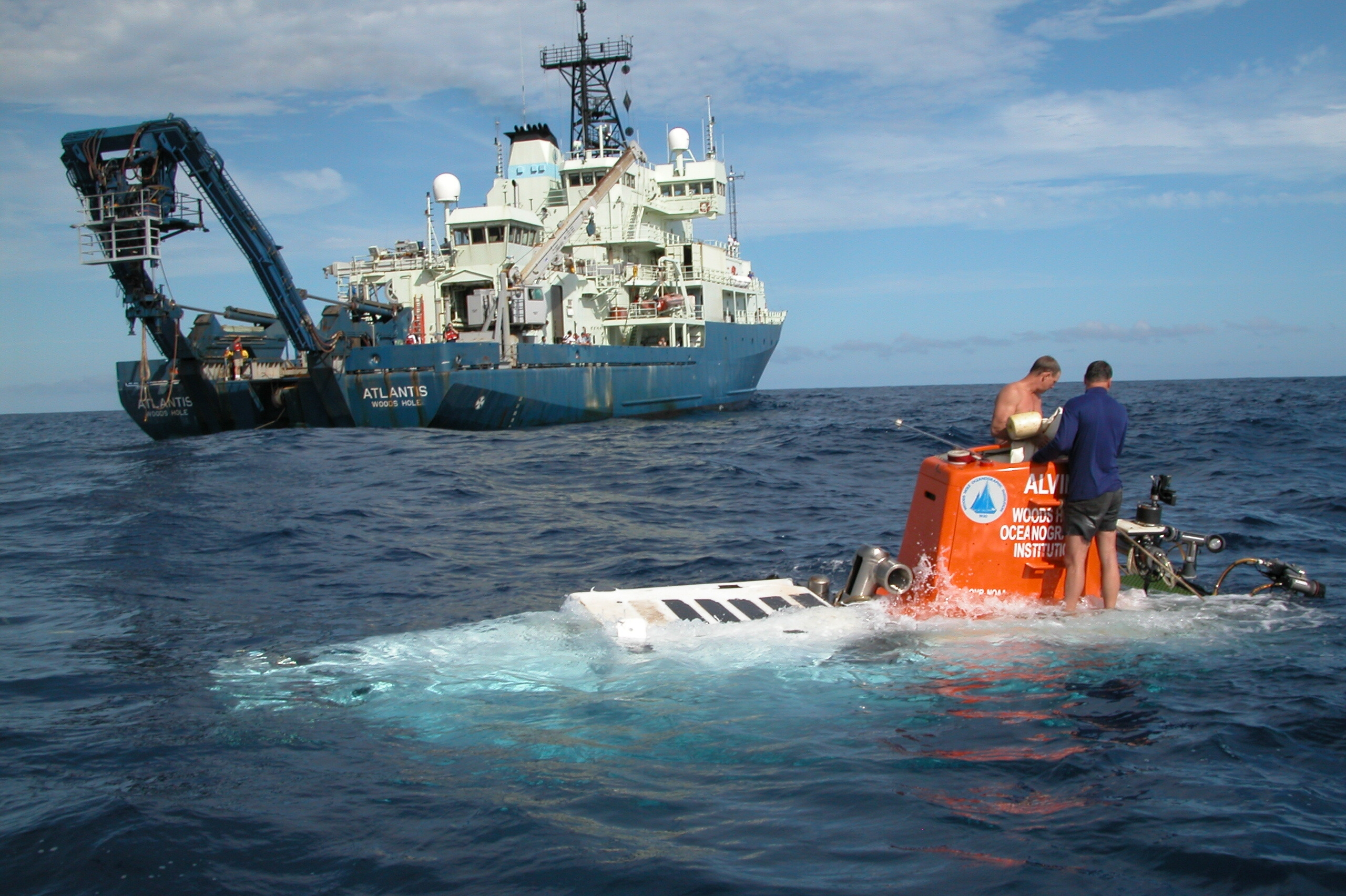
Mountains in the Sea Expedition, 2004

Over the years, Alvin has undergone many overhauls to improve its equipment and extend its lifetime. The current Alvin is the same as the original vessel in name and general design only. All components of the vessel, including the frame and personnel sphere, have been replaced at least once. Alvin is completely disassembled every three to five years for a complete inspection.

=== 1973 upgrade ===
In 1973, Alvin's pressure hull was replaced by a newer titanium pressure hull. The new hull extended the submersible's depth rating to 12,000 feet (3,700 m), double the working depth of the original steel hull. The rating was raised to 4,000 metres (13,000 ft) in 1976 and, after calculations and tests carried out with Naval Sea Systems Command, to 4,500 metres (14,800 ft) in 1994.

=== 2006 upgrade ===
A new robotic arm was added in 2006.

=== 2008 upgrade ===
In June 2008 construction started on a stronger, slightly larger personnel sphere which was used to upgrade Alvin, before being used in an entirely new vehicle. The new sphere was designed, and then forged from solid titanium ingots in two equal halves at Ladish Forge, Cudahy, Wisconsin. Then the 15.5 tonnes of titanium was machined and assembled, utilizing five view ports (instead of the previous three) and is designed for depths of over 6,000 m (20,000 ft), where Alvin's previous depth limit was 4,500 m (14,800 ft). This, along with a general upgrade of support systems, instruments and materials. These upgrades allow Alvin to reach 98% of the ocean floor.

=== 2011 to 2014 rebuild ===
Starting January 2011 Alvin began an extensive rebuild, which featured new cameras, lighting, and an enlarged titanium personnel sphere. This three-and-a-half-year effort to upgrade the vessel to eventually increase its depth capability from 4,500 meters (14,800 ft) to 6,500 meters (21,300 ft). In 2014, an extensively refitted Alvin conducted verification testing in the Gulf of Mexico, and was certified to return to service.

=== 2020 to 2022 upgrade ===
Starting in 2020, the second phase to upgrade Alvin for 6,500 meters (21,300 ft) operation began; the 2014 rebuild with new, larger titanium, personnel hull and rebuilt structural frame being the first phase. In this phase, Alvin received new titanium ballast spheres, a second Schilling manipulator arm, a 4K imaging system, several new syntactic foam modules, an upgrade to the hydraulic system, and new thrusters. During 2022, Alvin successfully completed sea trials and was certified for operating down to 6,500 meters.

== Current status ==
As of 2024, Alvin is in active service, operated by the Woods Hole Oceanographic Institution. It makes about 100 dives a year with funding from the National Science Foundation, the Office of Naval Research and NOAA. The research ship RV Atlantis serves as its support ship.

== Operation ==
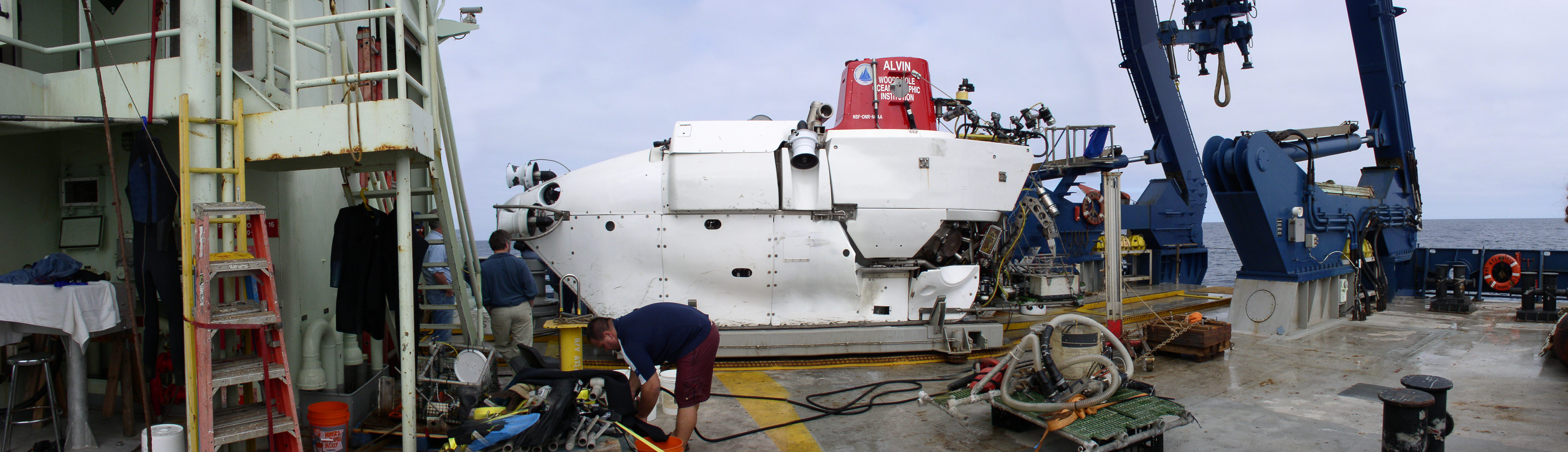
DSV Alvin on the fantail (stern) of RV Atlantis following a dive. On the right side of the photograph the A-frame crane can be seen that lowers Alvin into the water and lifts it back on board, and on the left, Alvin's hangar.

Like most deep submergence vehicles, Alvin is normally transported on board its support vessel. It is launched shortly before a dive, and recovered after the dive, using a suitable launch and recovery system (LARS) mounted on the support vessel. The support vessel is usually the R/V Atlantis, but several others have been used.

Alvin uses four 208-pound (94 kg) steel weights (~1.7 cubic feet of steel) to provide negative buoyancy for the trip to the ocean floor. Alvin contains a ballast and trim system, but the steel weights allow deep dives to be achieved more rapidly. These weights are jettisoned on each dive and left at the bottom.

== See also ==
- Hydrothermal vent – Fissure in a planet's surface from which heated water emits
- Deep-submergence vehicle – Self-propelled deep-diving crewed submersible
- Mid-ocean ridge – Basaltic underwater mountain system formed by plate tectonic spreading
- RISE project – 1979 international marine research project
- Jack Corliss – American geochemical oceanographer
- Bruce P. Luyendyk – American geophysicist and oceanographer (born 1943)
- Bruce Strickrott – American Deep Sea Explorer (born 1964)
- Kenneth C. Macdonald – American oceanographer (born 1947)
- Fred Spiess – American marine biologist

=== Alvin-class DSV ===
- Turtle (DSV-3) – US Navy crewed deep-ocean research submersible
- Sea Cliff (DSV-4) – US Navy crewed deep-ocean research submersible
- Nemo (DSV-5) – Submersible used by the United States Navy

=== Other deep submergence vehicles ===
- Aluminaut – First aluminum-hulled submarine
- Trieste – Deep-sea scientific submersible
- Trieste II – United States Navy's second bathyscaphe (DSV-1)
- SP-350 Denise – French two-person submarine built in 1959
- Jiaolong – Chinese crewed deep-sea research submersible
- DSRV-1 Mystic – US Navy deep-submergence rescue vehicle
- DSRV-2 Avalon – Mystic-class deep-submergence rescue vehicle
- NR-1 – Experimental nuclear submarine
- MIR 1 and MIR 2 – Self-propelled deep submergence vehicle
- Nautile – Crewed submersible owned by Ifremer
- Pisces-class deep submergence vehicle – Three person research deep-submergence vehicles
- Sea Pole-class bathyscaphe – Chinese bathyscaphe class
- Dragon class bathyscaphe – Chinese bathyscaphe class
- Harmony class bathyscaphe – Chinese bathyscaphe class
- DSV Shinkai 6500 – Japanese crewed research submersible
- Shinkai 2000 – Japanese crewed research submersible
- Deepsea Challenger – Submersible that traveled to the Challenger Deep
- DSV Limiting Factor – Crewed full ocean depth rated submersible
