= FNRS-1 =

Belgian record-breaking balloon

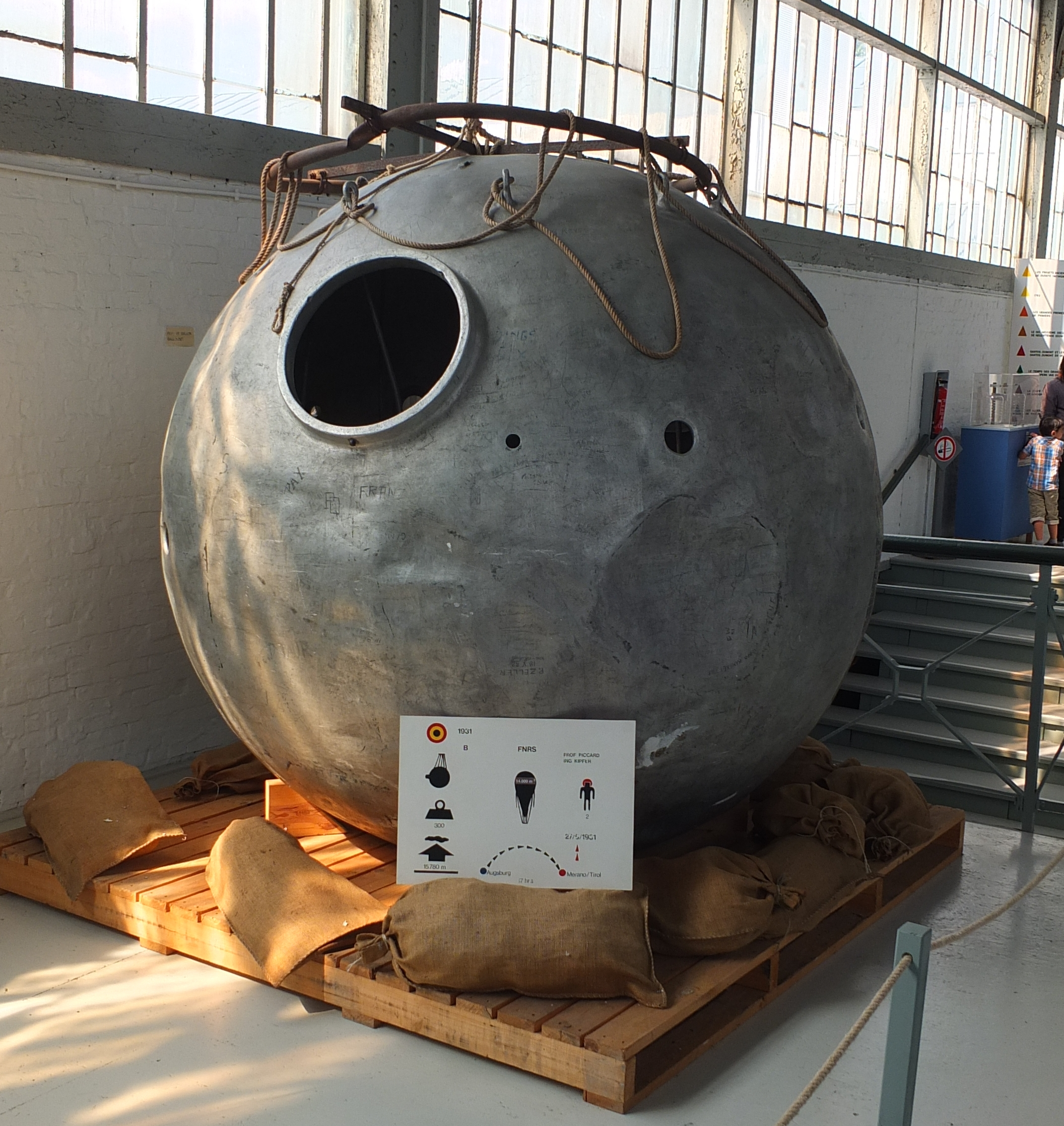
- RMM Piccard gondola

General information
- Type: Record-breaking balloon
- National origin: Belgium
- Manufacturer: Fonds National de la Recherche Scientifique
- Designer: Auguste Piccard
- Number built: 1

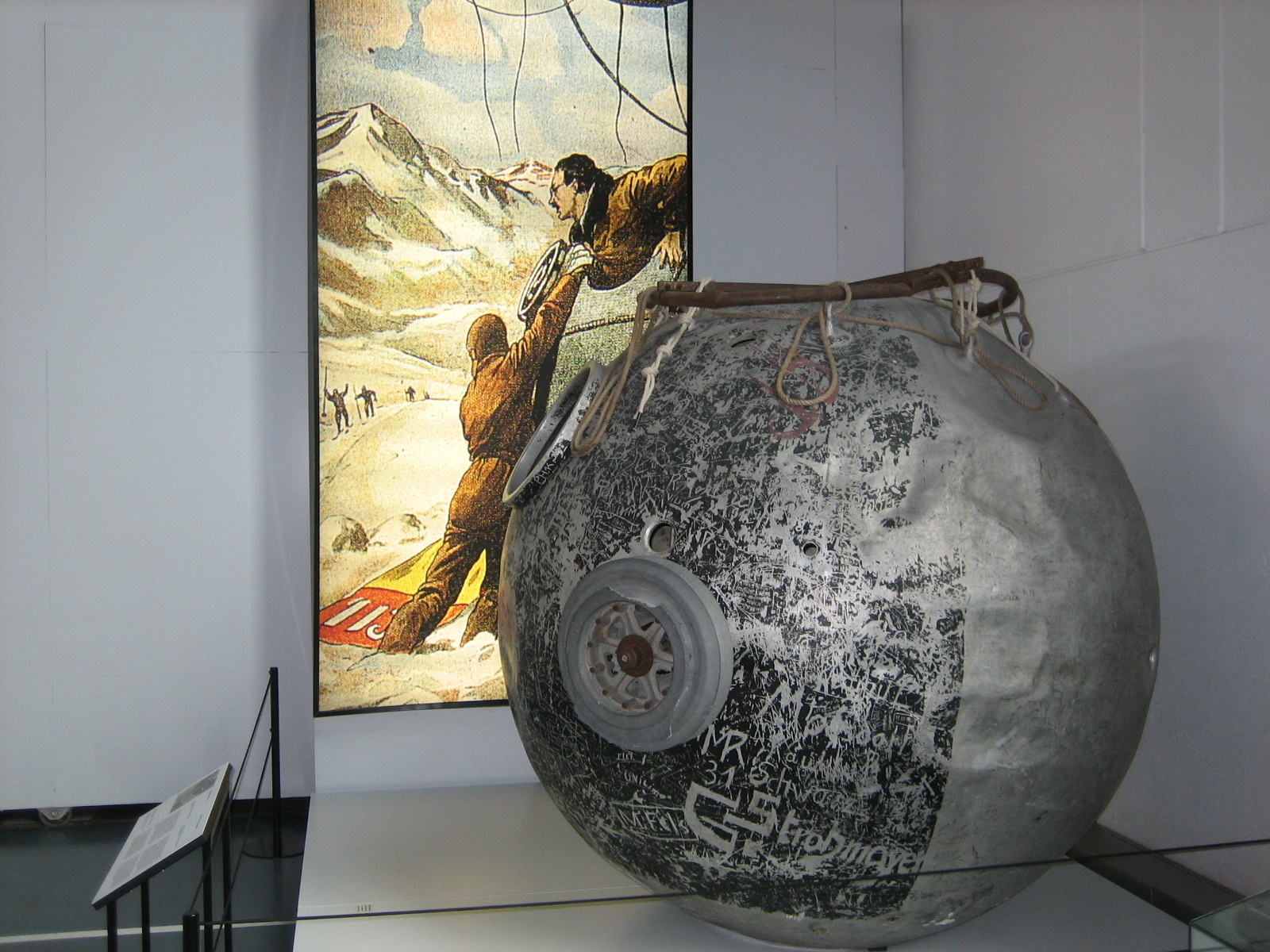
Auguste Piccard's FNRS-1 Gondola

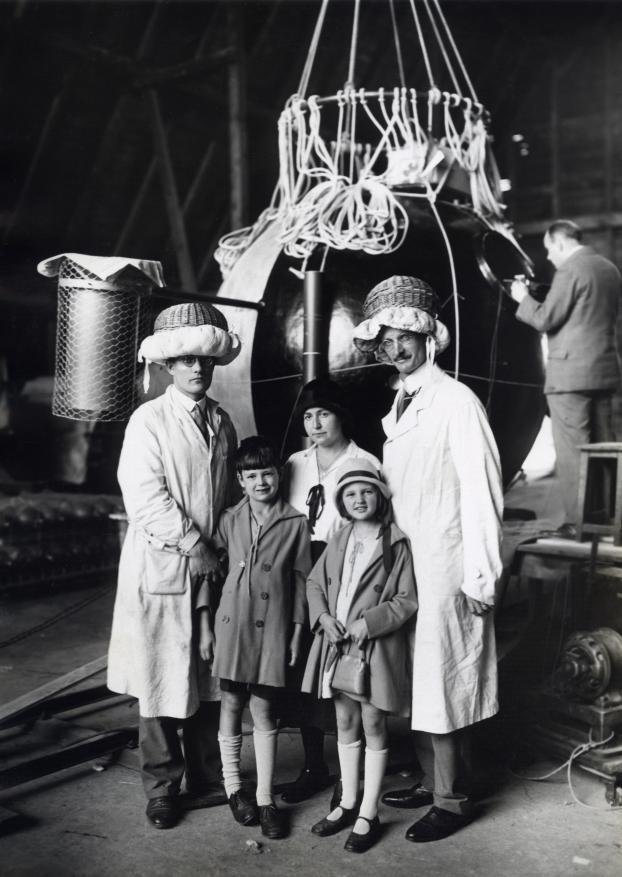
Professor Auguste Piccard (front right) with his family and engineer Kipfer in front of the capsule of the stratospheric balloon with which a flight will be made. The scientists are wearing helmets made from sewing baskets and pillows.

The FNRS-1 was a balloon, built by Auguste Piccard, that set a world altitude record. It was named after the Belgian Fonds National de la Recherche Scientifique, which funded the balloon.

== See also ==
- National Fund for Scientific Research
- FNRS-2, which was the first ever bathyscaphe built.
- FNRS-3, which was rebuilt from FNRS-2

== References and notes ==
=== Sources ===
- Ryan, Craig (2003). The Pre-Astronauts. Naval Institute Press. ISBN 1591147484, ISBN 978-1-59114-748-0.
- Shayler, David (2000). Disasters and accidents in manned spaceflight. Springer. pp. 20–22. ISBN 1852332255, ISBN 978-1-85233-225-9.
- Vaeth, Joseph Gordon (2005). They sailed the skies: U.S. Navy balloons and the airship program. Naval Institute Press. ISBN 1591149142, ISBN 978-1-59114-914-9.
