= FNRS-2 =

First bathyscaphe

History

Belgium
- Name: FNRS-2
- Completed: 1948
- In service: 1948
- Out of service: 1948
- Fate: Rebuilt as FNRS-3

General characteristics
- Type: Deep-submergence vehicle
- Length: 15 m (49 ft)
- Beam: 3.2 m (10 ft)
- Draft: 6 m (20 ft)
- Installed power: 1kW electric motor
- Speed: 0.5 knots (0.93 km/h; 0.58 mph)
- Endurance: 24h
- Test depth: 4,000 m (13,000 ft)
- Complement: 2

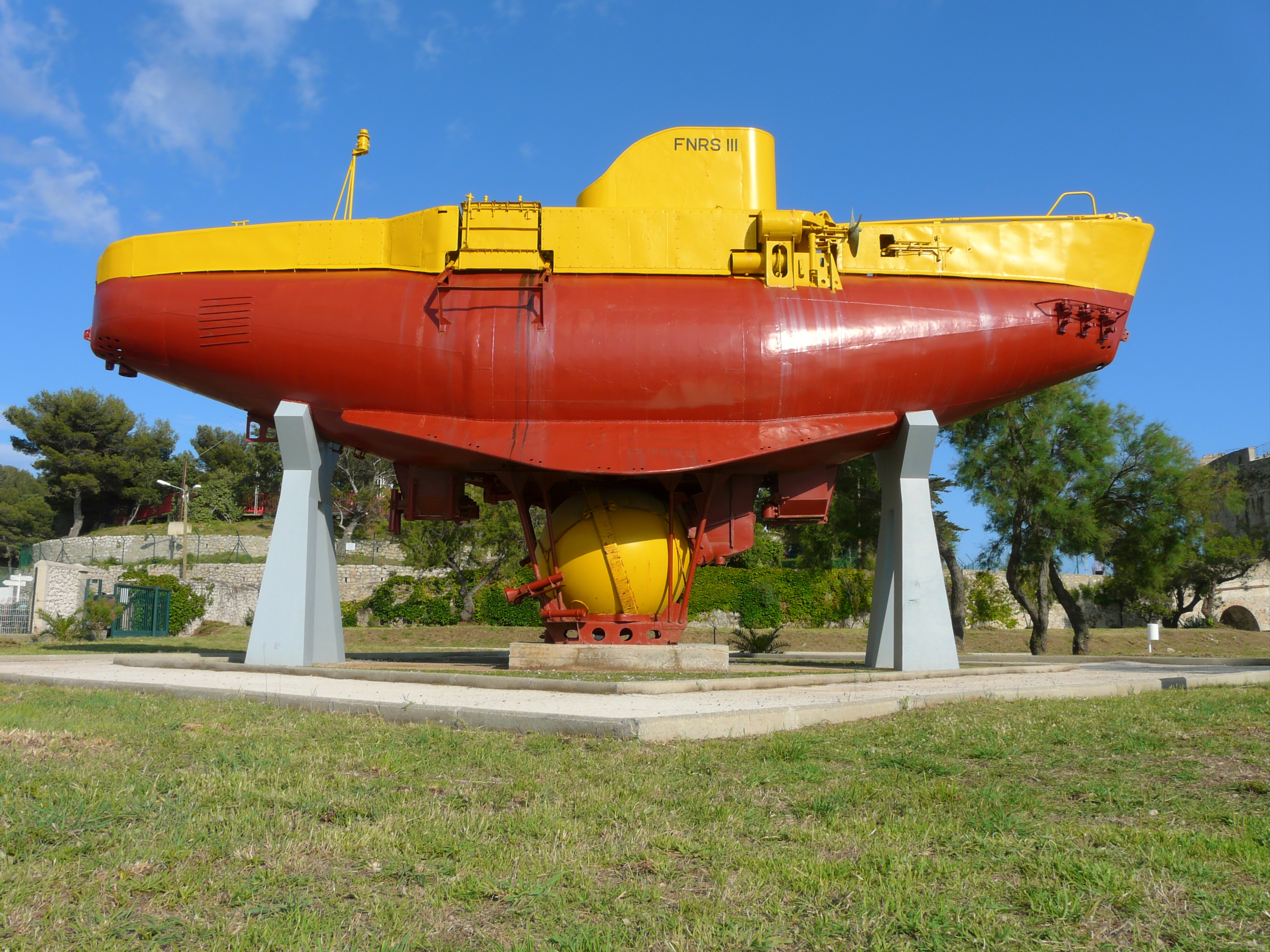
The FNRS-3 at the Tour Royale in Toulon.

The FNRS-2 was the first bathyscaphe. It was created by Auguste Piccard. Work started in 1937 but was interrupted by World War II. The deep-diving submarine was finished in 1948. The bathyscaphe was named after the Belgian Fonds National de la Recherche Scientifique (FNRS), the funding organization for the venture. FNRS also funded the FNRS-1 which was a balloon that set a world altitude record, also built by Piccard. The FNRS-2 set world diving records, besting those of the bathyspheres, as no unwieldy cable was required for diving. It was in turn bested by a more refined version of itself, the bathyscaphe Trieste.

FNRS-2 was built from 1946 to 1948. It was damaged during sea trials in 1948, off the Cape Verde Islands. FNRS-2 was sold to the French Navy when FNRS funding ran low, in 1948. The French rebuilt and rebaptised it FNRS-3. It was replaced by the Archimède. In February 1954 the FNRS-3 reached a depth of 4,050 metres (13,290 ft) in the Atlantic, 160 miles off Dakar, beating Piccard's 1953 record by 900 metres.

== Sea trials ==
FNRS-2 went for sea trials accompanied by the 3,500 t Belgian ship Scaldis, as its tender. However, Scaldis's crane was not strong enough to lift FNRS-2 while its float was filled, and this proved to be the detail that would end FNRS-2's career. An unmanned test dive to 4,600 feet (1,400 m) was successfully completed, but owing to technical problems, the support crew were unable to empty its float of the gasoline that was used for buoyancy. Scaldis attempted to tow FNRS-2 back to port, but it was battered by ocean waves and sprang a gasoline leak. After the leak was detected, the gasoline was dumped into the sea and FNRS-2 was raised. However, there was no reserve of gasoline for replacement, nor funding to fix the float.

== See also ==
- Trieste
- Trieste II
- Georges Houot
- Archimède

== Bibliography ==
- Le Bathyscaphe, en collaboration avec Pierre Willm, Éditions de Paris, 1954
- La Découverte sous-marine, Éditions Bourrellier, 1959 ASIN B0018195MO
- 20 ans de Bathyscaphe, Éditions Arthaud, 1972 ASIN B0000DY5EO
- Le bathyscaphe - à 4500 m. au fond de l'océan ASIN B0000DVJS0
- Bathyscaphe le à 4050 m au fond de l'océan ASIN B0000DP36O
- 2000 Fathoms Down ASIN B001947NIS
