= FNRS-3 =

Bathyscaphe of the French Navy

Coordinates: 43.103609°N 5.925765°E

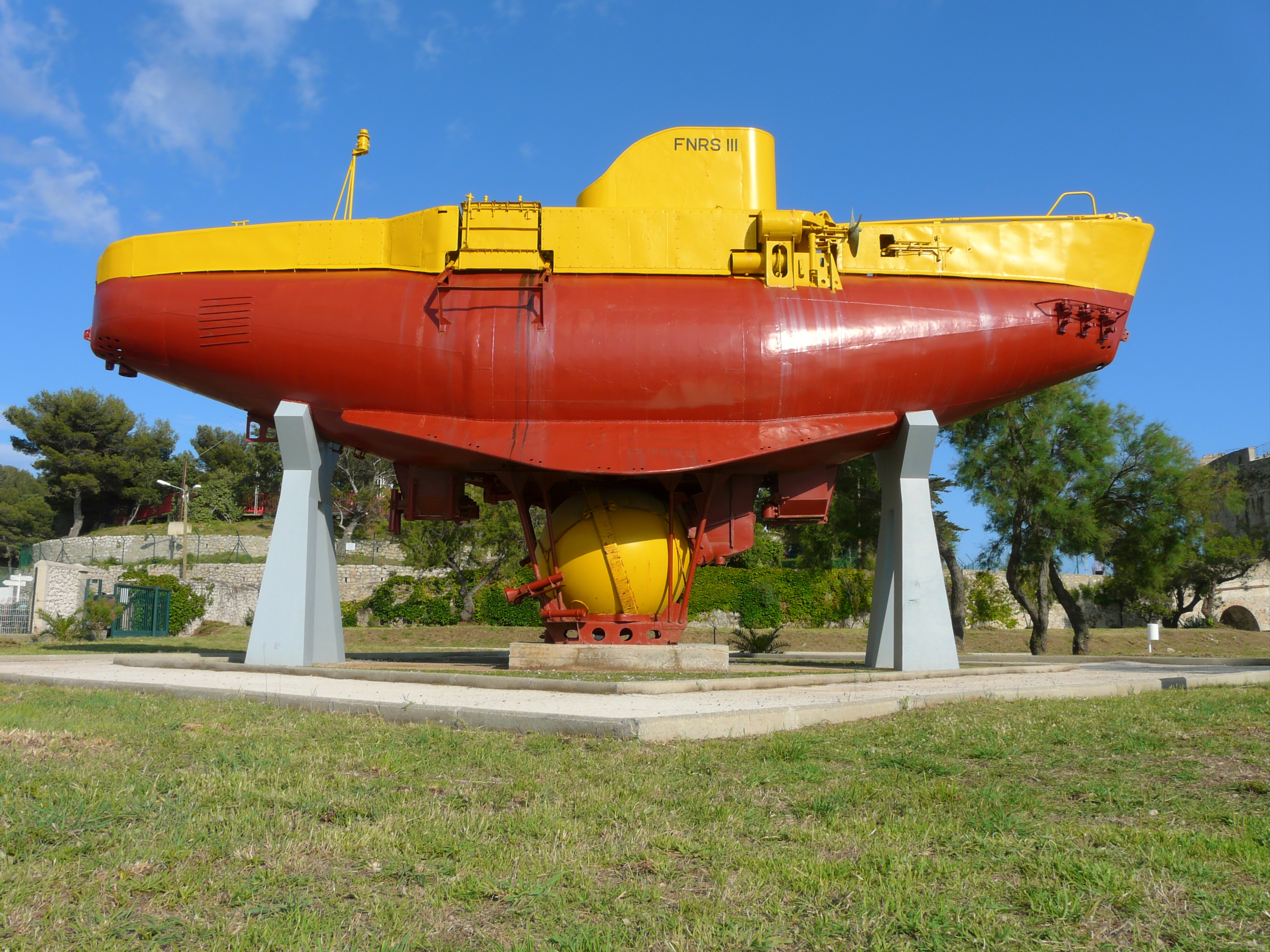
- FNRS-3

History

France
- Name: FNRS-3
- Ordered: 1950
- Completed: 1953
- In service: 1953
- Status: Preserved at the Toulon naval base

General characteristics
- Type: Deep-submergence vehicle
- Length: 15 m (49 ft)
- Beam: 3.2 m (10 ft)
- Draft: 6 m (20 ft)
- Installed power: 1kW electric motor
- Speed: 0.5 knots (0.93 km/h; 0.58 mph)
- Endurance: 24h
- Test depth: 4,000 m (13,000 ft)
- Complement: 2

The FNRS-3 or FNRS III is a bathyscaphe of the French Navy. It is currently preserved at Toulon. She set world depth records, competing against a more refined version of her design, the Trieste. The French Navy replaced her with the bathyscaphe Archimède, in the 1960s.

After damage to the FNRS-2 during its sea trials in 1948, the Belgian Fonds National de la Recherche Scientifique (FNRS) ran out of funding, and the submersible was sold to the French Navy, in 1950. She was subsequently substantially rebuilt and improved at Toulon naval base, and renamed FNRS-3. She was relaunched in 1953, under the command of Georges Houot, a French naval officer.

On 15 February 1954, she made a 4,050 metres (13,290 ft) dive 160 miles off Dakar, Senegal, in the Atlantic Ocean, beating the 1953 record of Auguste Piccard, set by the Trieste, by 900 meters. Piccard's record had been set by reaching the floor of the Mediterranean off Naples, a depth of 10,392 feet (3,167 m). The new record set by FNRS-3 was not exceeded until a workup dive by Trieste in 1959, working up to the record shattering Challenger Deep dive.

== See also ==
- Trieste
- Trieste II
- Archimède
