= Jiaolong (submersible) =

Chinese crewed deep-sea research submersible

蛟龙号 Jiaolong
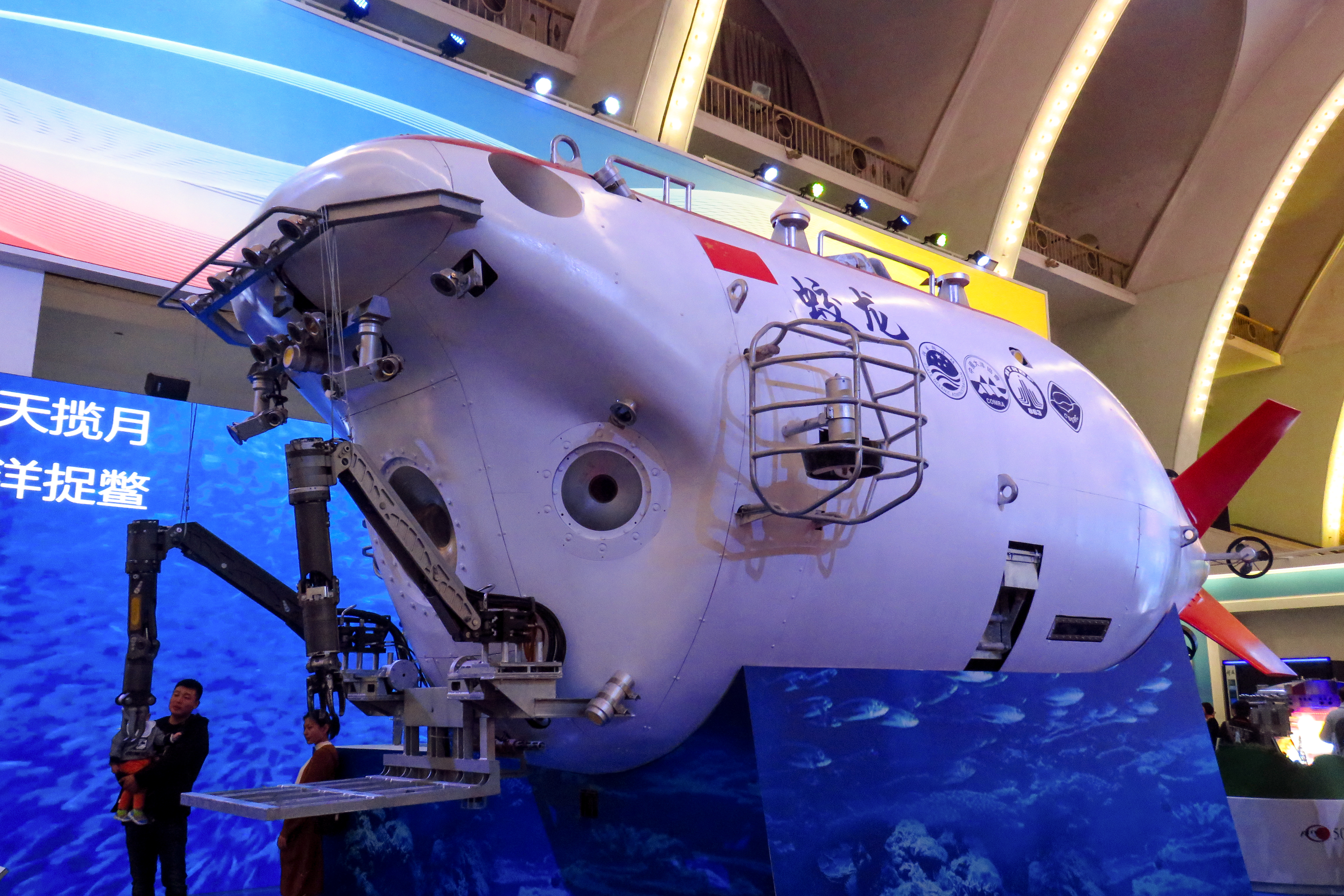
- A small model of Jiaolong submersible

History

China
- Name: Jiaolong
- In service: 2010

General characteristics
- Type: Deep-submergence vehicle
- Tonnage: 22
- Length: 8 m (26 ft)
- Beam: 3 m (9.8 ft)
- Installed power: electric motor
- Test depth: 7,500 m (24,600 ft)
- Complement: 3

Jiaolong (simplified Chinese: 蛟龙号; traditional Chinese: 蛟龍號; pinyin: jiāolóng hào; lit. 'flood dragon') is a Chinese crewed deep-sea research submersible that can dive to a depth of over 7,000 metres (23,000 ft), developed from the Sea Pole-class bathyscaphe. It has the second-greatest depth range of any crewed research vehicle of the Chinese Navy; the only crewed expeditions to have gone deeper were the dives of the Trieste bathyscaphe (10,916 metres (35,814 ft)) in 1960, Archimède (9,560 metres (31,360 ft)) in 1962, Deepsea Challenger (10,898 metres (35,755 ft)) in 2012, and DSV Limiting Factor (10,925 metres (35,843 ft)) in 2019 (with three diving to Challenger Deep).

The general designer is Xu Qinan (徐芑南), a former professor at the School of Naval Architecture, Ocean and Civil Engineering (船舶与海洋工程学院) of Shanghai Jiao Tong University (SJTU), who also designed many other Chinese submersibles and uncrewed underwater vehicles. Xu is now an academician for the Chinese Academy of Engineering. The first deputy general designer is Cui Weicheng (崔维成), and the deputy general designer was Zhu Weiqing (朱维庆).

On June 27, 2012, the Jiaolong with two oceanauts reached a depth of 7,062 meters (23,169 feet) in the Mariana Trench in the western Pacific Ocean. Previously, on June 19, 2012, the Jiaolong reached a depth of 6,965 metres (22,851 feet). It had its first test in South China Sea between May 31 and July 18, 2010, reaching a depth of 3,759 metres (12,333 ft) with three crew. On July 22, 2011, Jiaolong reached a depth of 4,027 metres (13,212 ft) in northeastern Pacific. The five-hour mission included chemical, physical and biological research. Seventeen dives have been completed.

Besides China, other countries that have developed deep-water technology include the United States, France, Russia, India and Japan.

== See also ==
- Deep-submergence vehicle – Self-propelled deep-diving crewed submersible
- DSV Shinkai 6500 – Japanese crewed research submersible
- Nereus (underwater vehicle) – Hybrid remotely operated or autonomous underwater vehicle
- China Shipbuilding Science Research Center
