= Georges Houot =

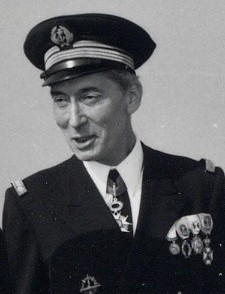
- Georges Houot in 1970
- Born: August 29, 1913; Paris
- Died: August 7, 1977 (aged 63)
- Education: Prytanée militaire military school
- Military career
- Allegiance: France
- Branch: Navy
- Commands: Élie Monnier
- Awards: Grande Médaille d'Or des Explorations

Georges Houot (French: [ʒɔʁʒ uo]; 29 August 1913 – 7 August 1977) was a French naval officer and commander of a bathyscaphe unit.

== Biography ==
He was born in Paris and educated at the Prytanée militaire military school at La Flèche in the Pays de la Loire region. In 1933 he entered the Naval College near Brest in Brittany where he trained to be a torpedo officer. As an officer he served on the cruiser Gloire from 1940 to 1941, the destroyer Hardi in 1942 and the frigates Croix-de-Lorraine (1945–47) and Lac Pavin (1947–49).

In 1949, Houot succeeded Jacques Cousteau as commander of the underwater research vessel, Élie Monnier, which was used for exploring the sea bed. In spite of suffering from the after-effects of polio he took part in the diving activities of the men under his command and developed an interest in underwater research.

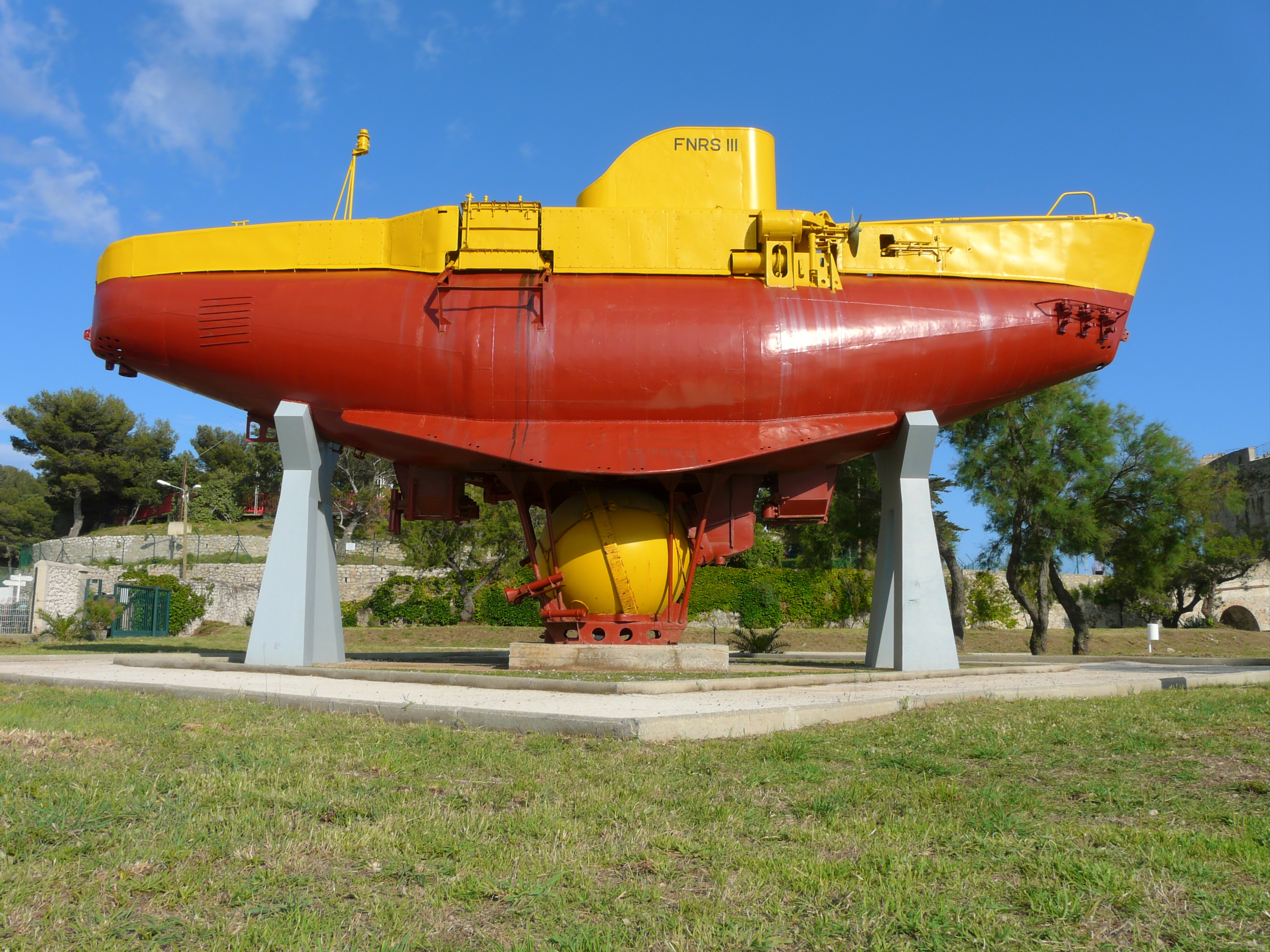
FNRS III

In 1951 he was chosen to direct the trials of the FNRS III bathyscaphe, and in 1953 was given overall command of the bathyscaphes. On 15 February 1954 he made, with the engineer Pierre Willm, a dive off Dakar to a record 4050 metres, a record that stood for six years. Both men were awarded the Grande Médaille d'Or des Explorations et Voyages de Découverte by the French Société de Géographie and a film made by Jacques Ertaud, " 4050 Depth " told the story of that first dive. Between 1953 and 1960, Houot made a total of 93 dives, in the Mediterranean and off Dakar, Portugal and Japan.

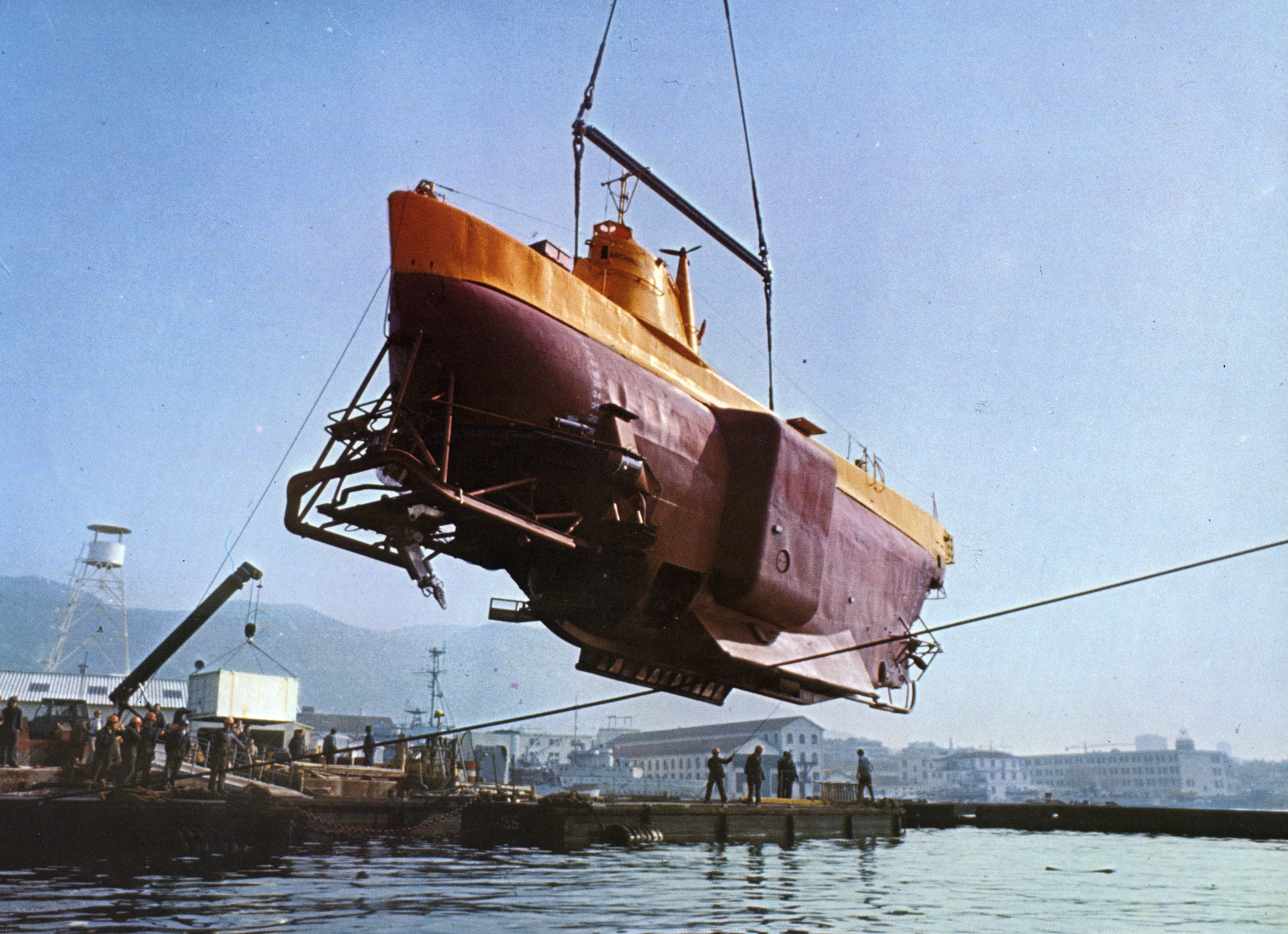
The launch of Archimède

The success of FNRS III and the increased interest shown by the scientific community in the study of the sea bed led Houot and Willm in 1955 to consider the construction of a new submersible capable of reaching the deepest depths in the ocean (11,000 metres to the bottom of the Mariana Trench in the Pacific), of being more manoeuvrable and of offering more space for scientists. After approval had been granted and funds raised the craft, named Archimède, was built at Toulon and launched on 28 July 1961. Houot then took command of Archimède and the mother ship Marcel-le-Bihan and from July to August 1962, carried out deep underwater tests in the Kuril trench off Japan. He successively reached 7100 metres, 9050 metres, 9200 metres and 9500 metres, the maximum depth of the trench. Between 1961 and 1970 Commander Houot carried out 64 dives with the bathyscaphe in the Mediterranean and off Japan, Puerto Rico, Greece, Madeira and the Azores.

In November 1970, Houot retired after 37 years of service, including 17 as head of the bathyscaphe group. He died in 1977.

== Honours and awards ==
Houot was made a Commander of the Legion of Honour and received a number of other awards.

== Bibliography ==
- Le Bathyscaphe, together with Pierre Willm, 1954
- La Découverte sous-marine, 1959
- 20 ans de Bathyscaphe, 1972
- Le bathyscaphe - à 4500 m. au fond de l'océan
- Bathyscaphe le à 4050 m au fond de l'océan
- 2000 Fathoms Down
