= Sea Pole-class bathyscaphe =

Chinese bathyscaphe class

History

People's Liberation Army Navy
- Name: Sea Pole
- Ordered: 2
- Awarded: 2
- Cost: 180 million ¥
- Sponsored by: People's Republic of China
- Completed: 2008
- Acquired: 2009
- Commissioned: 2009
- Maiden voyage: 2008
- In service: 2009
- Status: Project ends

General characteristics
- Type: bathyscaphe
- Displacement: 24 t in air
- Length: 8.2 m (27 ft)
- Beam: 3 m (9.8 ft)
- Draft: 3.4 m (11 ft)
- Propulsion: electrical
- Speed: 2.5 kt
- Range: 12 hr
- Endurance: 3 x 12 hr
- Test depth: 7,000 m (23,000 ft)
- Complement: 3
- Sensors & processing systems: sonar & search lights

The Sea Pole (Hai Ji, or Chinese: 海极) class bathyscaphe is a class of bathyscaphe of the People's Republic of China (PRC). They are capable of diving up to 7,000 meters, covering 99.8% of the oceanic floor of the world. Two units of this class are planned, with derivatives to follow and are used by both the civilian and military establishments in China.

== Design ==
Sea Pole class bathyscaphe is designed by the 702nd Research Institute of China Shipbuilding Industry Corporation. The general designer is Mr. Xu Huangnan (Chinese: 徐芑南), a professor of School of Naval Architecture, Ocean and Civil Engineering (Chinese: 船舶与海洋工程学院) of Shanghai Jiao Tong University (SHJTU), who also designed many other Chinese submersibles and unmanned underwater vehicles. The first deputy general designer is Mr. Cui Weicheng (Chinese: 崔维成), and the deputy general designer was Mr. Zhu Weiqing (Chinese: 朱维庆), all of the three are academicians of the Chinese Academy of Sciences. There are two mechanical arms with associated tools that enable the bathyscaphe to perform a various tasks at its maximum operational depth, and this pair of mechanical arms with 7 degrees of freedom (7-DOF) are mounted on the right and left sides of the vehicle, which is powered by 110 kWh (110 V, 800 Ah) silver oxide – zinc batteries.

The Sea Pole bathyscaphe is equipped with various communication systems, but the data transfer rate remains a bottleneck, with the transmission rate only being 80 kbit/s, compared to 100 Mbit/s in the usual internet transmissions. As a result, the transmission of an ordinary color image from the bathyscaphe to the mothership takes approximately half a minute.

The pressure hull is built of titanium alloy, and the manufacturing method for the pressure hull involves producing two hemispherical parts by tungsten inert gas (TIG) welding six-side plates to a top plate, followed by heat treatments and polishing by machining; the two halves are then TIG welded together to form a complete sphere. The plate thickness is 76 – 78 mm, with deviations of ±4 mm in the completed radius, and sphericity is 0.4% or less. Pressure testing of the pressure hull was performed in Russia, and included a one-hour test at a water pressure equivalent to 7,700 meters, or a 10% greater depth than the vessel's, 7,000 m maximum operational depth, a continuous hour-long test at water pressure equivalent to 7,000 m, and a test simulating 0 to 7,000 m ascent/descent of the submersible, which was repeated six times. There were no problems reported in any of these tests, and the pressure hull passed with flying colors.

All viewports of Sea Pole class bathyscaphe have a circular truncated cone shape. There is a large viewport with diameter of 20 cm mounted in the bow, and this central view port is the same type of that of Russian Mir class bathyscaphe. The two additional smaller side viewports of 12 cm diameter are mounted on portside and starboard side, closer to the front than other bathyscaphes. The advantage of this arrangement is that it enables navigation while both the pilot and the scientists simultaneously observe an objective in front of the vehicle. However, the side views have limited field of vision. There are two onboard life supporting system based on that of Shenzhou 6 spacecraft, and additionally, there are two onboard oxygen generating systems independent of life supporting system for additional safety. The pressure hull is built of titanium.

Sea Pole class bathyscaphe has a teardrop shape tapering toward the stern and four tail fins which form an X shape. The main thruster system is based on the same design principle as that of the Russian Mir class bathyscaphe. Four main thrusters inclined in a narrowing shape are mounted in the spaces between the four fins. One horizontal thruster is mounted on the top of the bow, and thrusters for vertical / horizontal turning and auxiliary propulsion are provided on the two sides of the hull. Parallel movement in the horizontal direction is achieved by using a combination of the horizontal thruster on the bow and the right and left stern thrusters, while vertical movement uses a combination of the bow side thrusters and the top and bottom stern thrusters.

== Sea Pole 1 ==
Sea Pole 1 (Hai Ji Yi Hao, 海极一号) or Sea Pole #1, was the first Sea Pole class bathyscaphe. Due to the high standard of design requirement, the Chinese industrial capability was not adequate enough to meet the requirements, and as a result, the titanium pressure hull was built in Russia, the mechanical arms were built in the US, and the buoyancy system was built in the UK. Sea Pole 1 begun its sea trials in October 2008, and reportedly entered service in 2009. Trials were mostly conducted with a mother ship named (Da Yang Yi Hao, 大洋一号), a modified research ship. Although Sea Pole class bathyscaphe was designed to carry an operator and two scientists, Chinese authorities have announced that in the near future, Sea Pole 1 will carry three operators and no scientists for test and evaluation purposes. The unit price of Sea Pole 1 is around 180 million ¥, or roughly 25 million US dollars.

== Sea Pole 2 ==
Sea Pole 2 (Hai Ji Er Hao, 海极二号) or Sea Pole #2, was the second Sea Pole class bathyscaphe, and possibly the last unit of this class. Unconfirmed Chinese reports (mostly on the internet) have suggested that previous deals China signed with foreign contractors for Sea Pole 1 included technological transfer, and Sea Pole 2 would utilize more domestically produced components once Chinese manufacturers mastered the technologies transferred, but such claims have yet to be confirmed by independent or official sources. One of the most important upgrade of Sea Pole 2 is to increase its communication capability by boosting the data transmission rate via fiber optics. Based on the experience of sea trials of Sea Pole 1, it was recommended that a class of dedicated mother ships be built, with the first one being Great Ocean II (Da Yang Er Hao, or 大洋二号).

== Specifications ==
The specification for Sea Pole 2 bathyscaphe is not yet publicized, but it is reportedly differs from that of Sea Pole 1 slightly. The specification of Sea Pole 1 is listed here.

- Length: 8.2 meters
- Width: 3 meters
- Height: 3.4 meters
- Inner diameter of the pressure hull: 2.1 meters
- Mass: 24 tons in air
- Payload: 220 kg
- Maximum speed: 2.5 kt
- Cruise speed: 1 kt
- Worst weather condition for deployment: Sea state 4
- Crew: 3
- Endurance: 12 hr
- Maximum operating depth: 7,000 meters
- Never to exceed depth: 7,100 meters
- Crash depth: 7,700 meter
- Life support: 3 x 12 hr

== Dragon class bathyscaphe ==
Dragon (Jiao Long, 蛟龙) class bathyscaphe is developed from Sea Pole class bathyscaphe, claimed to be an indigenous design by the Chinese government. Designed by the 702nd Research Institute of the China Shipbuilding Industry Corporation, Dragon class bathyscaphe is slightly smaller than its predecessor, with overall length slightly reduced to 8 meter from the original 8.2 meter of Sea Pole class. Other external difference included the reconfiguration of the support skid: instead of a single large skid on each side totaling a pair in the Sea Pole class, the support skid system of the Dragon class consists of two smaller ones on each side, totaling four. The propulsion system of the Dragon class is also different from that of the Sea Pole class: while the propulsion system at the stern remain unchanged, the smaller thrusters at port side and starboard side on board Sea Pole class is replaced by a pair of much larger thrusters on the Dragon class, with one on each side. Furthermore, these two larger thrusters are protected by frames that are not present on the Sea Pole class. Other dimensional and performance parameters remain the same.

== Harmony class bathyscaphe ==
Harmony (He Xie 和谐) class bathyscaphe is a further planned development of the original Sea Pole class, and looks very similar to the Dragon class bathyscaphe. The main external difference between the Dragon class and the Harmony class is in the number of search lights: instead of three on the port and starboard sides as on the Sea Pole and Dragon classes, there are four on the Harmony class, and instead of four above the main observation window on the Sea Pole and Dragon classes, there are five on the Harmony class.

== Deployment ==
Sea pole class bathyscaphes are deployed on the mothership, Chinese research ship Xiangyanghong (向阳红) No. 9, the only ship right now capable of handling these bathyscaphes. More ships need to be built or converted if every bathyscaphe is to have its own mothership. At least one specially built mothership was requested by scientific research establishments in China, designated as Great Ocean No. 2 (Da Yang Er Hao, 大洋2号). However, in an interview in March 2009, the general engineer of the 702nd Institute, Mr. Yan Kai (颜开) revealed that there was insufficient funding and as a result, the program was significantly slowed down, with the work on the follow-on units postponed. Meanwhile, the first unit completed a 300-meter dive test on Sept 20th 2009. In early Oct 2009, they reached a depth of 1109 meters during a test dive. On May 31, 2010, 3000 meter dive tests began, and concluded on Jul 18, 2010, with a test dive reaching a depth of 3757 meters on Jul 9th 2010. More testing is planning on the availability of additional funding. Should enough funding is provided for all units planned, only one unit would be operating at any given time, while the second unit is in transit, the third is being maintained, and the fourth being used for training.
