= DSV Shinkai 6500 =

Japanese crewed research submersible

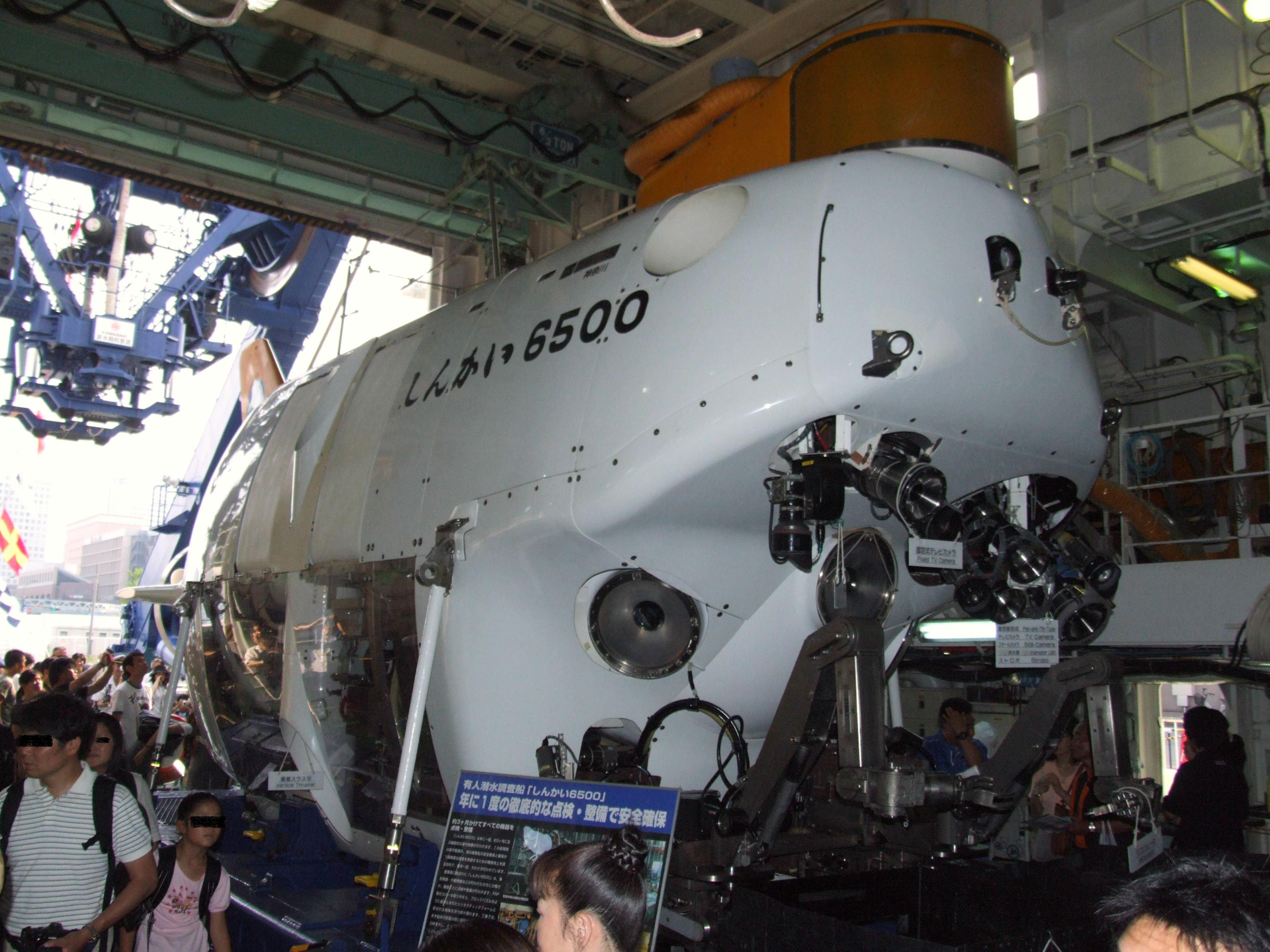
- Shinnkai 6500

History

Japan
- Name: Shinkai 6500
- Builder: Mitsubishi
- In service: 1989

General characteristics
- Type: Deep-submergence vehicle
- Length: 9.5 m (31 ft 2 in)
- Beam: 2.7 m (8 ft 10 in)
- Draft: 3.2 m (10 ft 6 in)
- Installed power: Electric motor
- Speed: 2.5 knots (4.6 km/h; 2.9 mph)
- Endurance: 129 hrs
- Test depth: 6,500 m (21,300 ft)
- Complement: 3

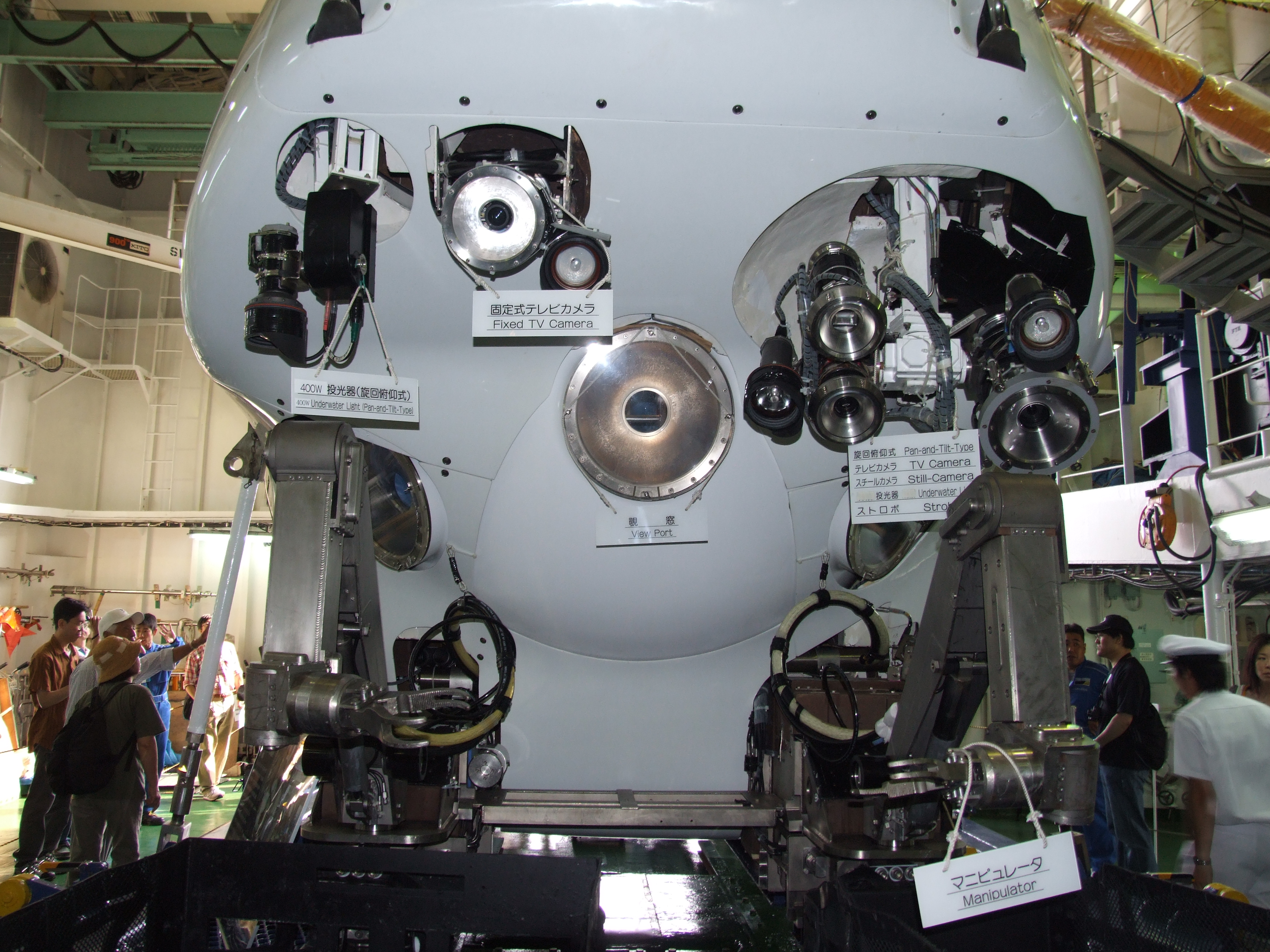
Shinkai 6500 front view

Shinkai 6500 (しんかい) is a crewed research submersible that can dive up to a depth of 6,500 metres (21,300 ft). It was completed in 1990. The Shinkai 6500 is owned and run by the Japan Agency for Marine-Earth Science and Technology (JAMSTEC) and it is launched from the support vessel Yokosuka.

Two pilots and one researcher operate within a 73.5 mm-thick (2.89 in) titanium pressure hull with an internal diameter of 2.0 metres (6 ft 7 in). Buoyancy is provided by syntactic foam.

Three 14 cm (5.5 in) methacrylate resin view ports are arranged at the front and on each side of the vehicle.

A Lego set based on the submersible was created through the Lego Cuusoo website.
