= Bathyscaphe =

Free-diving self-propelled deep-sea submersible

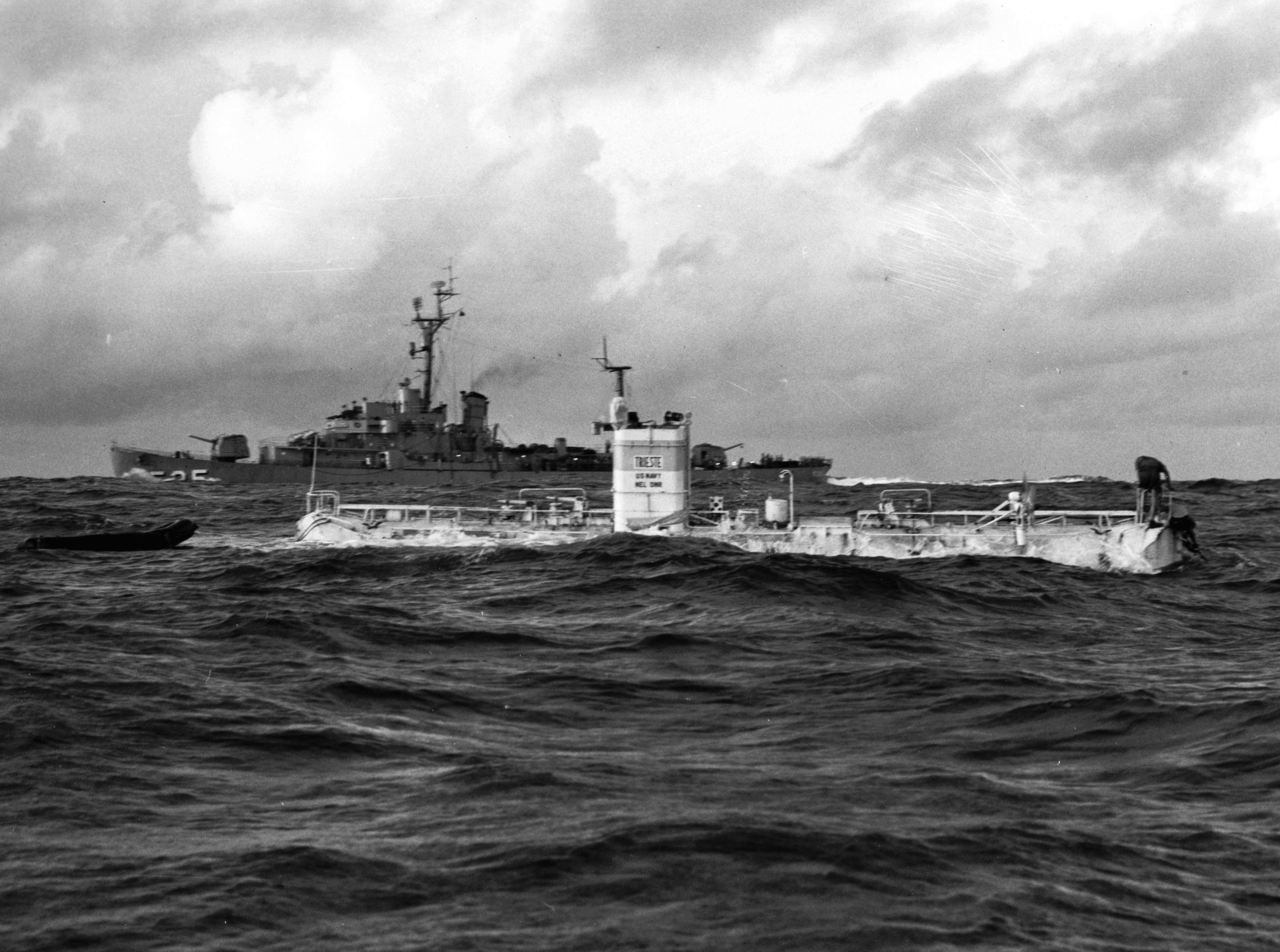
Bathyscaphe Trieste before its only dive into the Mariana Trench

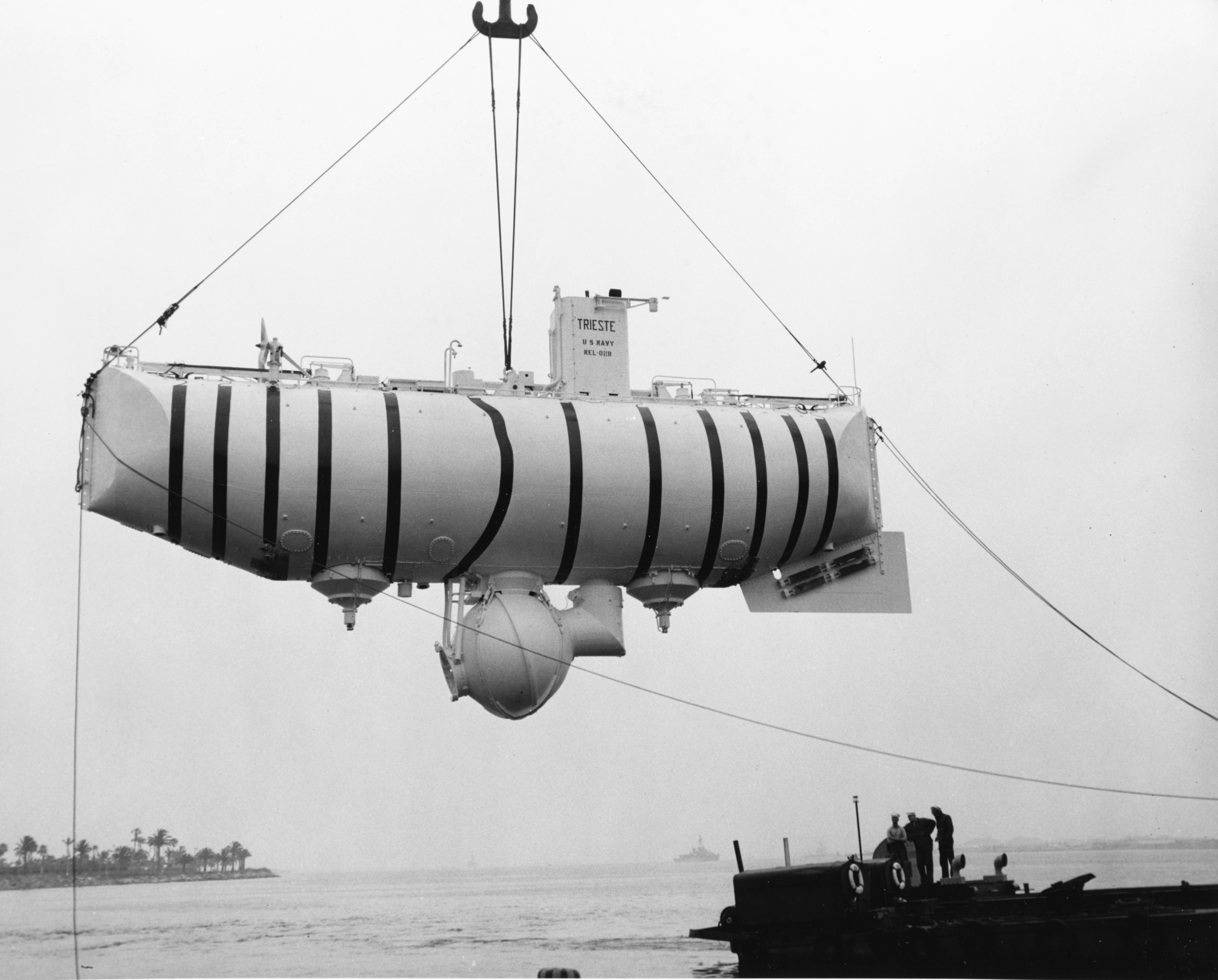
The Trieste in 1958

A bathyscaphe (/ˈbæθɪˌskeɪf, -ˌskæf/) is a free-diving, self-propelled deep-sea submersible, consisting of a crew cabin similar to a bathysphere, but suspended below a float rather than from a surface cable, as in the classic bathysphere design.

The float is filled with gasoline because it is readily available, buoyant in water, and practically incompressible, like any liquid. The incompressibility of the gasoline means the tanks can be very lightly constructed, since the pressure inside and outside the tanks equalizes, eliminating any differential. By contrast, the crew cabin must withstand a huge pressure differential and is massively built. Buoyancy at the surface can be trimmed easily by replacing gasoline in the tanks with water, because water has a greater density.

Auguste Piccard, inventor of the first bathyscaphe, coined the name bathyscaphe from the Ancient Greek words βαθύς (bathús), meaning 'deep', and σκάφος (skáphos), meaning 'vessel, ship'.

== Mode of operation ==
Internal arrangement of Trieste.

To descend, a bathyscaphe floods air tanks with sea water, but unlike a submarine, the bathyscaphe cannot displace the water in the flooded tanks with compressed air to ascend, because the water pressures at the depths in which the craft was designed to operate are too great. For example, the pressure at the bottom of the Challenger Deep is more than seven times that in a standard "H-type" compressed gas cylinder. Instead, ballast in the form of iron shot, which is well over seven times as dense as seawater, is released to allow ascent, the shot being lost to the ocean floor. The iron shot containers are in the form of one or more hoppers which are open at the bottom throughout the dive, the iron shot being held in place by an electromagnet at the neck. This is a fail-safe device as the craft requires no power to ascend; in fact, in the event of a power failure, shot runs out by gravity and ascent is automatic.

== History of development ==
The first bathyscaphe was dubbed FNRS-2, named after the Fonds National de la Recherche Scientifique, and built in Belgium from 1946 to 1948 by Auguste Piccard. (FNRS-1 had been the balloon used for Piccard's ascent into the stratosphere in 1938). Propulsion was provided by battery-driven electric motors. The float held 37,850 litres (8,330 imp gal; 10,000 US gal) of aviation gasoline. There was no access tunnel; the sphere had to be loaded and unloaded while on deck. The first journeys were detailed in the Jacques Cousteau book The Silent World. As described in the book, "the vessel had serenely endured the pressure of the depths, but had been destroyed in a minor squall". FNRS-3 was a new submersible, using the crew sphere from the damaged FNRS-2, and a new larger 75,700 litres (16,700 imp gal; 20,000 US gal) float.

Piccard's second bathyscaphe was actually a third vessel Trieste, which was purchased by the United States Navy from Italy in 1957. It had two water ballast tanks and eleven buoyancy tanks holding 120,000 litres (26,000 imp gal; 32,000 US gal) of gasoline.

== Accomplishments ==
In 1960 Trieste, carrying Piccard's son Jacques Piccard and Don Walsh, reached the deepest known point on the Earth's surface, the Challenger Deep, in the Mariana Trench in the Pacific Ocean.

The onboard systems indicated a depth of 37,800 ft (11,521 m) but this was later corrected to 35,813 ft (10,916 m) by taking into account variations arising from salinity and temperature. Later and more accurate measurements made in 1995 have found the Challenger Deep to be slightly shallower at 35,798 ft (10,911 m).

The crew of the Trieste, which was equipped with a powerful light, noted that the seafloor consisted of diatomaceous ooze and reported observing "some type of flatfish, resembling a sole, about 1 foot long and 6 inches across" (30 by 15 cm) lying on the seabed. This put to rest the question of whether or not there was life at such a depth in the complete absence of light.

== See also ==
- 1948 FNRS-2 – First bathyscaphe
- 1953 FNRS-3 – Bathyscaphe of the French Navy
- 1953 Trieste – Deep-sea scientific submersible
- 1961 Archimède – French Navy bathyscaphe
- 1964 Trieste II – United States Navy's second bathyscaphe
- 1964 Alvin – Crewed deep-ocean research submersible
- 1964 Aluminaut – First aluminum-hulled submarine
- 1970 DSV Shinkai – Crewed research submersible
- 1987 MIR – Self-propelled deep submergence vehicle
- 2012 Deepsea Challenger
- 2018 DSV Limiting Factor
- Deep-sea exploration – Investigation of ocean conditions beyond the continental shelf
- Diving chamber – Hyperbaric pressure vessel for human occupancy used in diving operations
- Sea Pole-class bathyscaphe – Chinese bathyscaphe class
- Submersible – Small watercraft able to navigate under water
- Timeline of diving technology – Chronological list of notable events in the history of underwater diving equipment
