= Archimède =

French Navy bathyscaphe

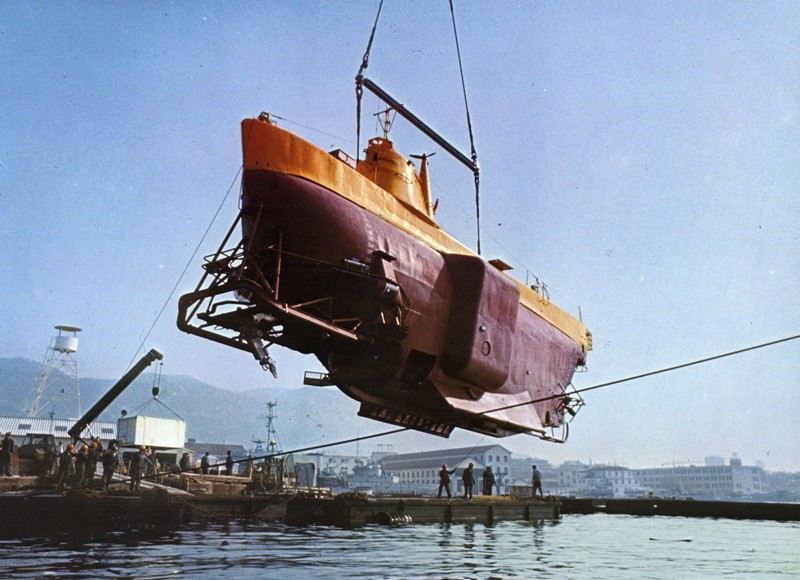
- Archimède in 1961, on launch

History

France
- Name: Archimède
- Namesake: Archimedes
- Builder: Arsenal de Toulon (DCAN)
- Commissioned: 27 July 1961
- Decommissioned: 1978
- Status: Preserved at the Cité de la Mer museum

General characteristics
- Type: Bathyscaphe
- Displacement: 61 tons

The bathyscaphe Archimède is a deep diving research submersible of the French Navy. It used 42,000 US gallons (160,000 L) of hexane as the gasoline buoyancy of its float. It was designed by Pierre Willm and Georges Houot. In 1964, Archimède descended into "what was then thought to be the deepest part of the Puerto Rico Trench", which the NY Times reported as 27,500 feet (8,400 m).

Archimède was christened on 27 July 1961, at the French Navy base of Toulon. It was designed to go beyond 30,000 feet (9,100 m), and displaced 61 tons. In October 1961, Archimède passed its first dive tests, diving to 5,000 feet (1,500 m) uncrewed. On 27 November 1961, Archimède achieved a speed of 3 knots (5.6 km/h; 3.5 mph), over a distance of 4.5 miles (7.2 km) at a depth of 7,870 feet (2,400 m) in the Mediterranean Sea.

On 23 May 1962, Archimède descended to 15,744 feet (4,799 m) off Honshu, Japan, in the Pacific, at the Japan Deep. On 15 July 1962, Archimède descended to 31,350 feet (9,560 m) into the Kuril–Kamchatka Trench, making it the second deepest dive ever, at that point in time, second only to the Bathyscaphe Trieste dive on the Challenger Deep. On 12 August 1962, Archimède descended to 30,511 feet (9,300 m) in the Japan Deep south of Tokyo.

Archimède explored the Mid-Atlantic Ridge jointly with the submarine Cyana and submersible DSV Alvin, in Project FAMOUS (French-American Mid-Ocean Undersea Study) in 1974.

Archimède operated until the 1970s. It was placed on reserve in 1975, and decommissioned in 1978.

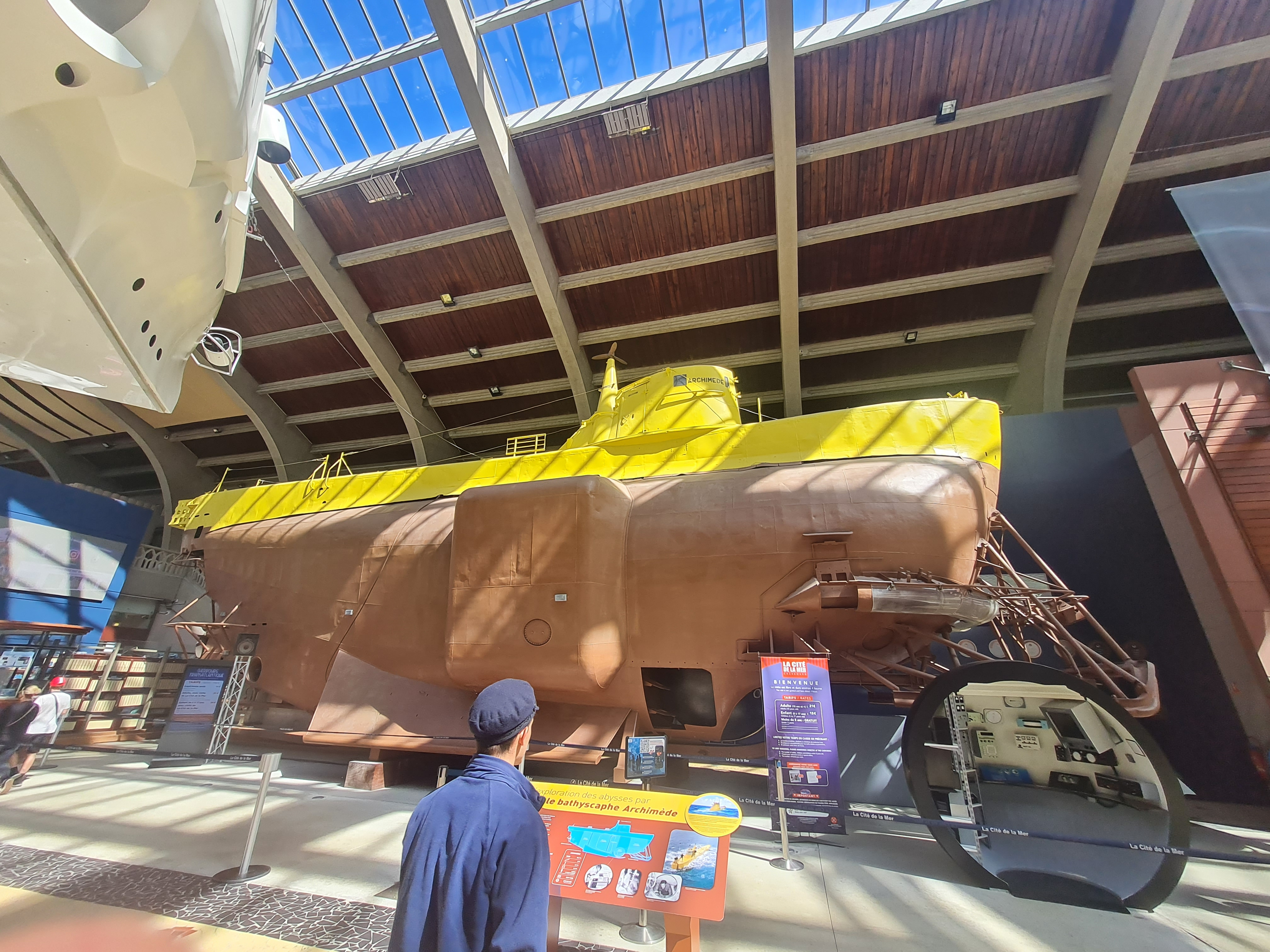
Archimede submarine bathyscaphe, preserved at Cite de la Mer, Cherbourg, France

Since 2001, Archimède is on display at the Cité de la Mer museum in Cherbourg.

Archimède was honoured with a stamp in Palau.
