= Remote-control vehicle =

Type of vehicle

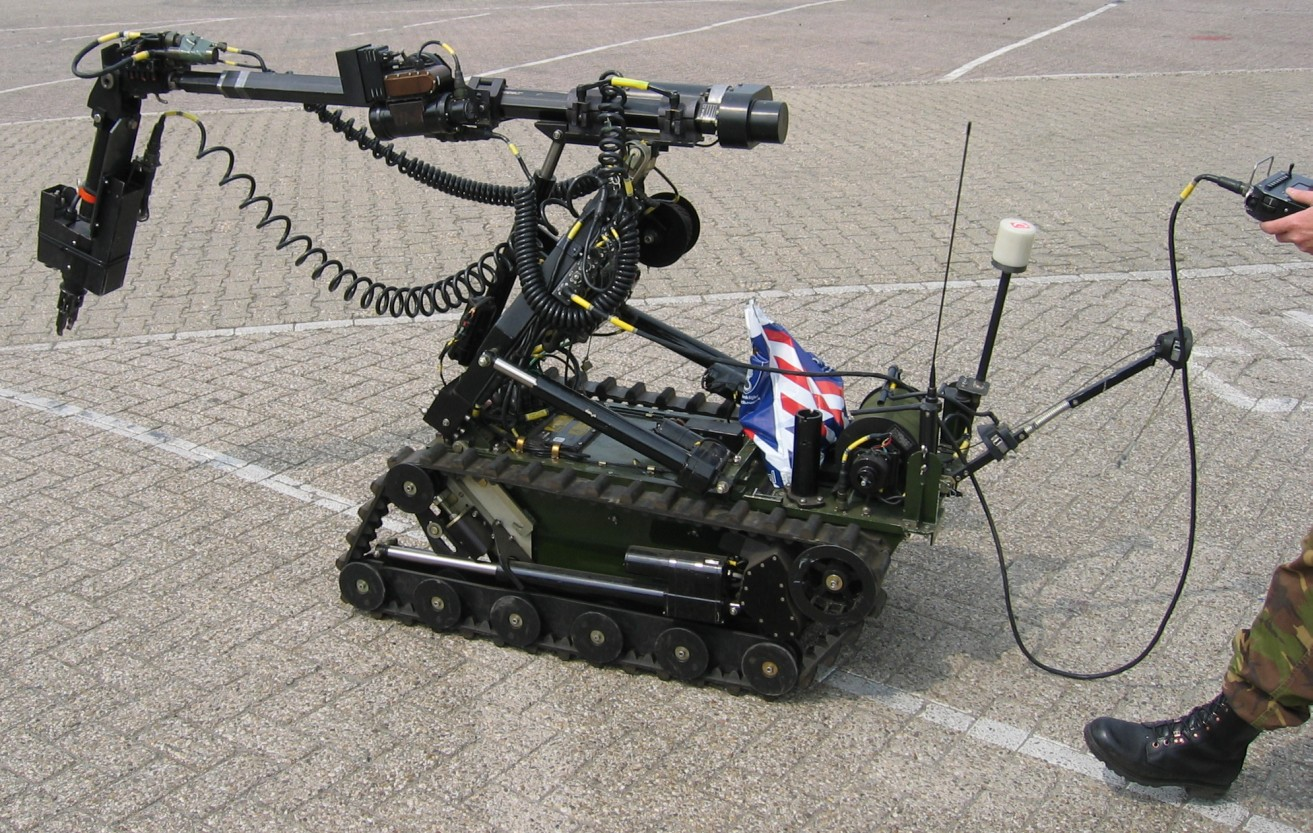
Remote-controlled vehicle to clear explosives

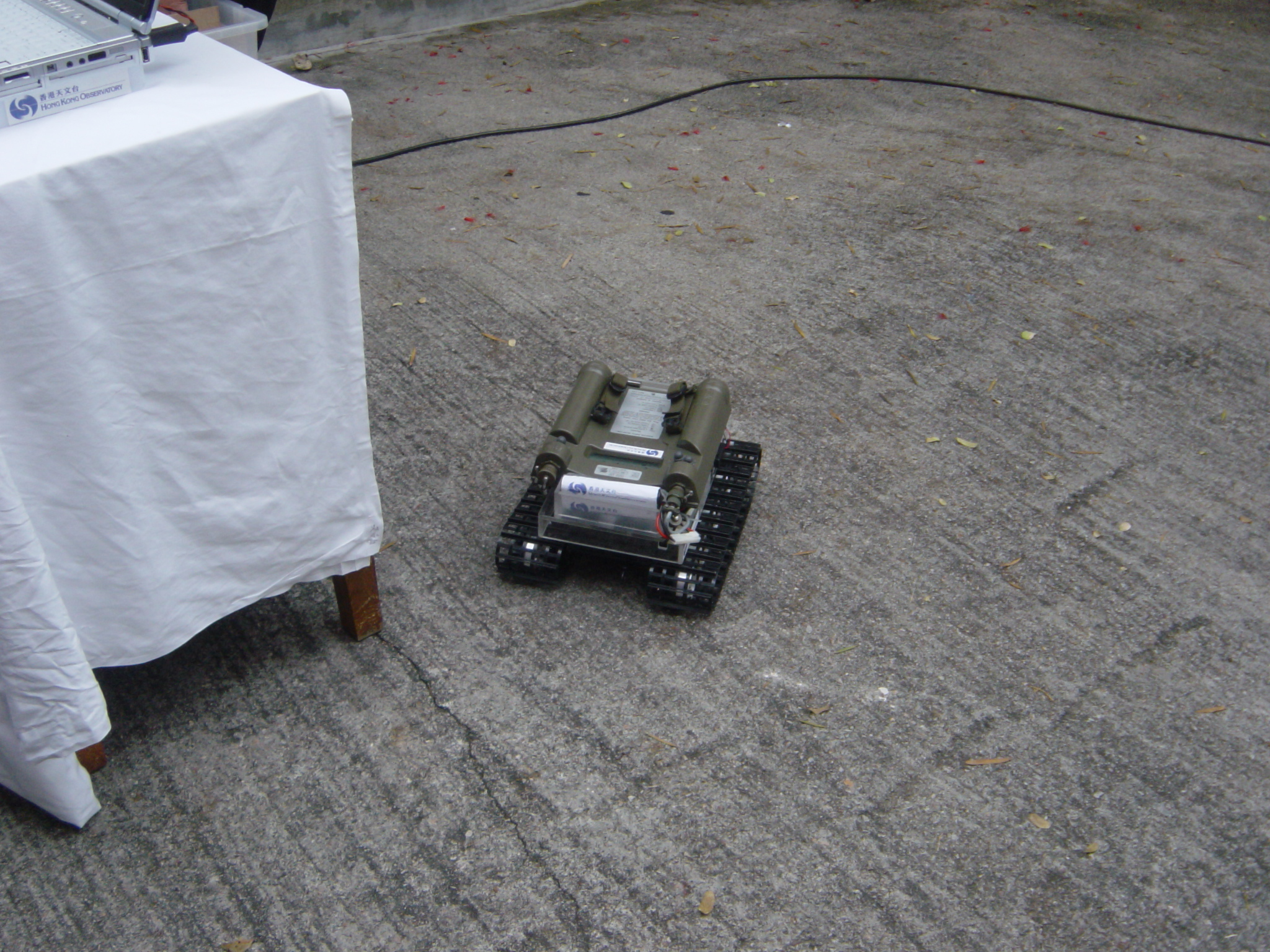
Remote-control mini-vehicle for radiological surveying

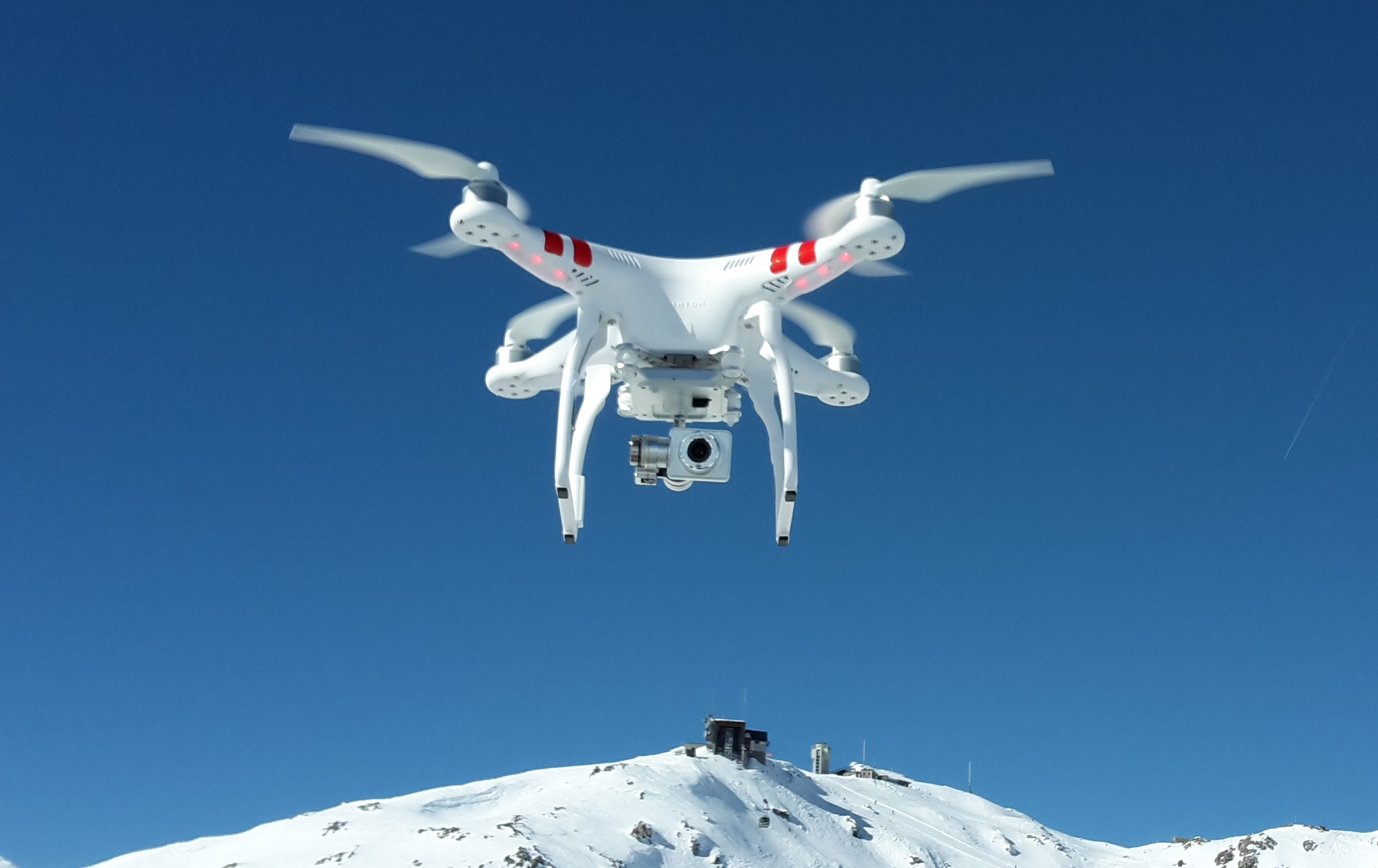
A remote-controlled DJI Phantom quadcopter for aerial photography

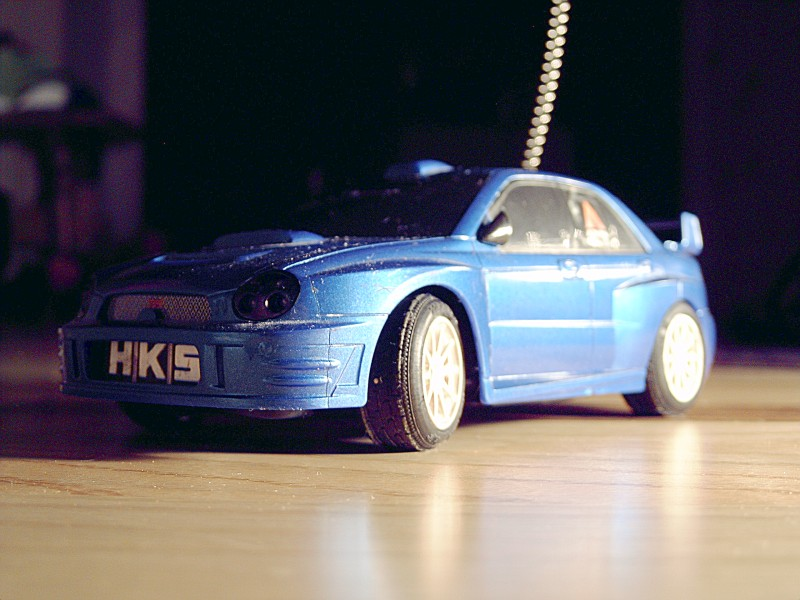
Remote-controlled toy Subaru Impreza

A remote-control vehicle is defined as any vehicle that is teleoperated by a means that does not restrict its motion with an origin external to the device. This is often a radio-control device, a cable between the controller and the vehicle, or an infrared controller.

== Applications ==
=== Scientific ===
Remote-control vehicles have various scientific uses, including operating in hazardous environments, working in the deep ocean, and space exploration.

==== Space probes ====
The majority of probes to other planets in the Solar System have been remote-control vehicles, although some of the more recent ones were partially autonomous. The sophistication of these devices has prompted greater debate on the need for crewed spaceflight and exploration. The Voyager I spacecraft is the first craft of any kind to leave the Solar System. The explorers Spirit and Opportunity have provided continuous data about the surface of Mars since January 3, 2004.

==== Submarines ====
Jason is the Woods Hole Oceanographic Institution's deep water explorer and can withstand depths of up to 6,500 feet.

The Scorpio ROV is a British submersible that rescued the crew of the Russian AS-28 on August 7, 2005.

=== Military and law enforcement ===
Military usage of remotely-controlled vehicles dates back to the first half of 20th century. John Hays Hammond, Jr., invented and patented methods for wireless control of ships starting in 1910. The Soviet Red Army used remotely-controlled teletanks during the 1930s in the Winter War and early stage of World War II. There were also remotely-controlled cutters and experimental remotely-controlled planes in the Red Army.

Remote-control vehicles are used in law enforcement and military engagements for some of the same reasons. Hazard exposure is mitigated for the operator of the vehicle, who controls it from a location of relative safety. Remote-controlled vehicles are also used for bomb disposal.

Unmanned aerial vehicles (UAVs) have undergone a significant evolution in capability in the past decade. Early UAVs were capable of reconnaissance missions alone and then only with a limited range. Current UAVs can hover around possible targets until they are positively identified before releasing their payload of weaponry. Backpack-sized UAVs will provide ground troops with over-the-horizon surveillance capabilities.

=== Recreation and hobby ===
Small-scale remote-control vehicles have long been popular among hobbyists. These remote-controlled vehicles span a wide range in terms of price and sophistication. There are many types of radio-controlled vehicles; these include on-road cars, off-road trucks, boats, submarines, airplanes, and helicopters. The "robots" now popular in television shows such as Robot Wars are a recent extension of this hobby.

Radio control is the most popular choice, as the vehicle's range is not limited by the length of a cable, nor does it require direct line-of-sight with the controller, which is the case with infrared control.

== See also ==
- Radio-controlled aircraft
- Remote-controlled animal
- Remotely operated underwater vehicle
- Robot control
- Teleoperation
- Telerobotics
- Unmanned aerial vehicle
- Unmanned ground vehicle
- Unmanned vehicle
