= Deep Drone =

US Navy remotely operated underwater vehicle

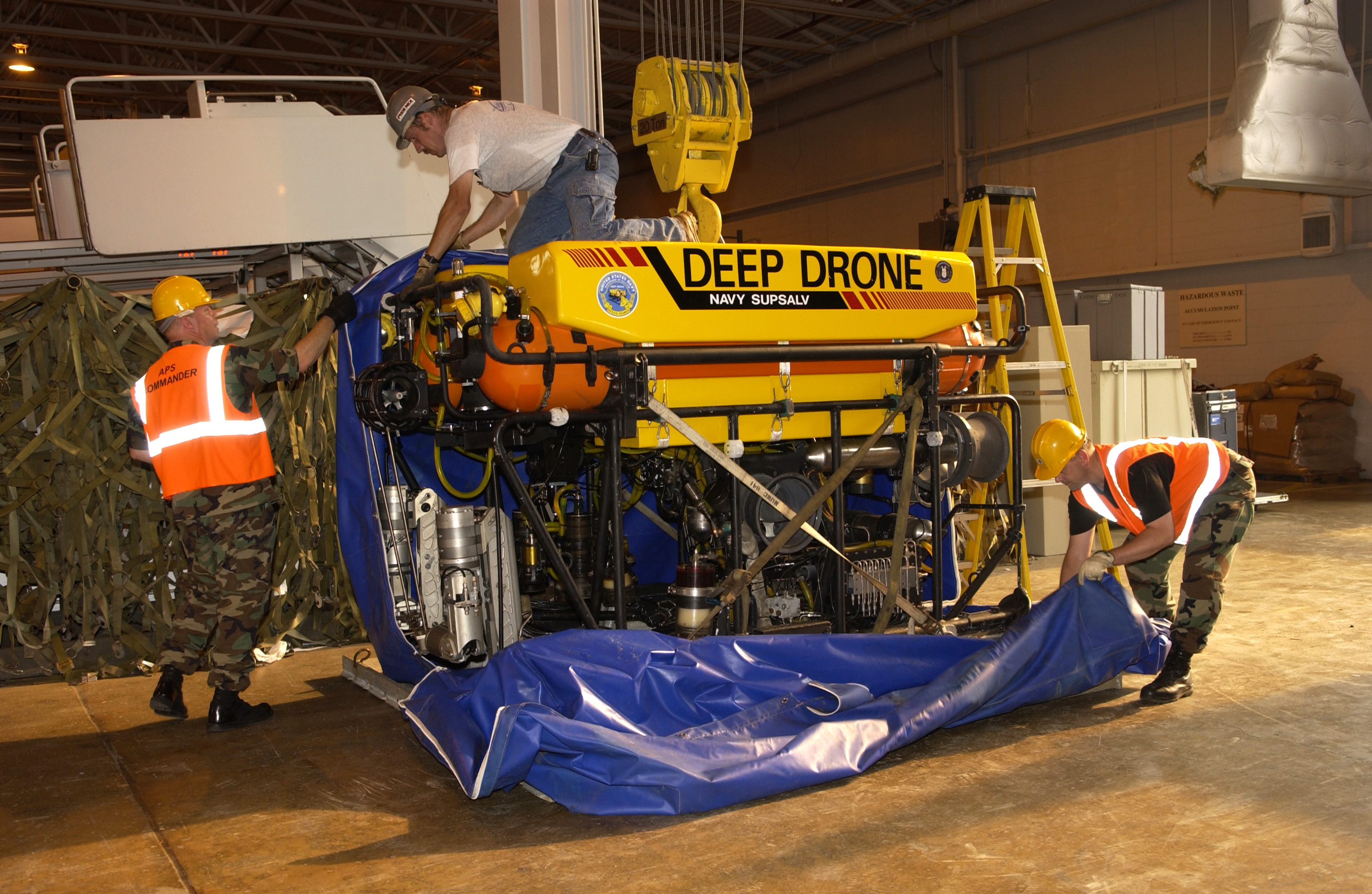
U.S. Navy Deep Drone ROV

The Deep Drone is a submersible remotely operated vehicle designed for mid-water salvage for the United States Navy. One vehicle is based in Largo, Maryland, under the command of The U.S. Navy Supervisor of Salvage and Diving (SUPSALV), it is maintained and operated by Phoenix International Inc. The vehicle is capable of operating at a depth up to 8,000 feet as reflected in its full name: "The Deep Drone 8000". The vehicle has a target locating sonar and two tool manipulators capable of working with tools and attaching rigging.

== Specifications ==
- Displacement: 4,100 lb (1,860 kg)
- Length: 9 ft 3 in (2.82 m)
- Width: 4 ft 7 in (1.40 m)
- Height: 6 ft 2 in (1.88 m)
- Maximum Depth: 8,000 ft (2,440 m)
- Speed: 3 knots cruise, 5 knots flank (6 and 9 km/h)
- Maximum lift: 3,200 lb (1,450 kg)
- Maximum payload: 300 lb (140 kg)

== AS-28 Submersible Rescue ==
The U.S. sent a Deep Drone vehicle and a Scorpio vehicle to the location of a Russian Priz class submersible AS-28 which was trapped on the sea floor off the Kamchatka Peninsula on 5 August 2005. The Russian vessel was released from cables trapping it on the sea floor by a British Scorpio ROV prior to the arrival of the Deep Drone. The vehicle was sent on a C-17 Globemaster III from Charleston, South Carolina.

== See also ==
- Scorpio ROV – Work class remotely operated underwater vehicle
- Korean Air Lines Flight 007 – 1983 aircraft shotdown over the Sea of Japan
- EgyptAir Flight 990 – 1999 aircraft crash in the Atlantic Ocean
