= James Fisher & Sons =

British shipowner and provider of marine engineering services

James Fisher and Sons plc
- Type: Public
- Traded as: LSE: FSJ
- Industry: Marine services
- Founded: 1847; 179 years ago
- Headquarters: Fisher House, Barrow-in-Furness, UK
- Key people: Angus Cockburn (Chairman); Jean Vernet (CEO); Karen Hayzen-Smith (Group Finance Director)
- Revenue: ▼£394.4 million (2025)
- Operating income: ▼£16.1 million (2025)
- Net income: ▼£(4.3) million (2025)
- Website: james-fisher.com

James Fisher and Sons plc (LSE: FSJ) is a British provider of marine engineering services, listed on the London Stock Exchange. It also remains a major shipowner, based in Barrow-in-Furness since the 1840s.

== History ==
The company was founded by James Fisher in 1847 in Barrow-in-Furness as a ship-owning business transporting haematite from the Cumbrian hills. In 1868 it had 70 ships and by the 1870s it owned the largest coasting fleet in the United Kingdom. It acquired the Furness Shipbuilding Company in 1870 but only went on to build one ship, Ellie Park. During the 1880s it slowly moved from operating sailing ships to operating steamers.

It was first listed on the London Stock Exchange in 1952. From the 1960s the company was managed by Directors with no family connection. At that time it established a reputation for moving heavy equipment, including even locomotives, by sea. By 1965 it had built its first ship suitable for transporting irradiated nuclear fuel. In the 1960s the company chartered up to a dozen of its ships to the Atlantic Steam Navigation Company to operate the latter's Preston based container services across the Irish Sea. In 1984 the company acquired short sea and offshore specialists Coe Metcalf Shipping, lifting the fleet to 42 vessels, and in 1996 it acquired P&O Tankships.

The company's division James Fisher Defence formerly operated the submarine rescue service for the Royal Navy, and provided the submersible Scorpio 45 which saved the lives of seven Russian sailors in their submarine AS-28 in 2005. In 2005 James Fisher acquired Fendercare Marine Solutions Ltd for £12m and in 2007 it acquired Buchan Technical Services for £5m and F T Everard & Sons Ltd, a leading competitor in the UK coastal shipping market, for £35m. In 2013 James Fisher acquired Divex Ltd for an initial consideration of £20m in cash plus a further maximum additional consideration of £13m linked to future profitability targets.

== Operations ==
The company operates from various locations throughout the world, with its corporate headquarters in Barrow in Furness, Cumbria, and provides the following services:

- Defence (design, construction and operation of rescue submarines)
- Port Agency
- Renewable Energy services
- Marine oil services
- Offshore oil services
- Shipping services
- Specialist technical services

== Fleet ==
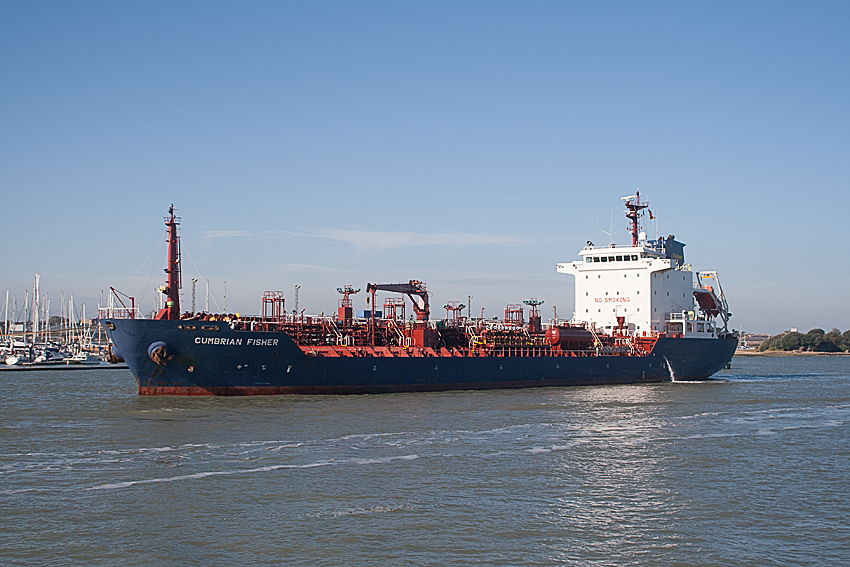
Cumbrian Fisher in Portsmouth Harbour

The charter tanker fleet is operated by the subsidiary James Fisher Everard.

Ship	Built	DWT	Notes
Cumbrian Fisher	2004	12,921	
Clyde Fisher	2005	12,984	
Raleigh Fisher	2005	35,192	Ex Maersk Raleigh
Shannon Fisher	2005	5,420	
Dee Fisher	2006	4,653	
Solway Fisher	2006	5,421	
Speciality	2006	4,426	Also handles petro-chemical cargoes
Seniority	2007	4,430	Also handles petro-chemical cargoes
Superiority	2007	4,415	Also handles petro-chemical cargoes
Sarnia Cherie	2007	3,515	Ex Vedrey Tora. Involved in supplying the Channel Isles
Corrib Fisher	2008	6,090	Ex Bomar Pluto
Sarnia Liberty	2008	3,532	Ex Vedrey Thor. Involved in supplying the Scottish Highlands and Islands
Pelican Fisher	2008	9,596	
Kestrel Fisher	2013	7,062	Ex Damen Bergum 9394.
King Fisher	2013	7,067	Ex Ouse.
Sir John Fisher	2022	6,106	
Lady Maria Fisher	2023	6,106	

== Sir John Fisher Foundation ==
The Sir John Fisher Foundation is a charitable trust established in 1980 by Sir John Fisher and his wife Lady Maria Fisher, in order to support good causes in the area surrounding the company's headquarters in Barrow-in-Furness. The foundation's capital fund includes its shareholding in James Fisher and Sons plc. The dividends paid by the company enable its trustees to make grants to charitable causes, throughout the UK, but with special regard to those based in and working for the benefit of people living in and around Barrow-in-Furness and surrounding area.
