= AS-34 =

AS-34 may be:

- USS Canopus (AS-34), United States Navy tender ship
- Russian submarine AS-34, Russian Navy Priz class rescue sub
- AS.34 Kormoran, German anti-ship missile
