= Alaska Airlines Flight 261 =

2000 aviation accident in the Pacific Ocean

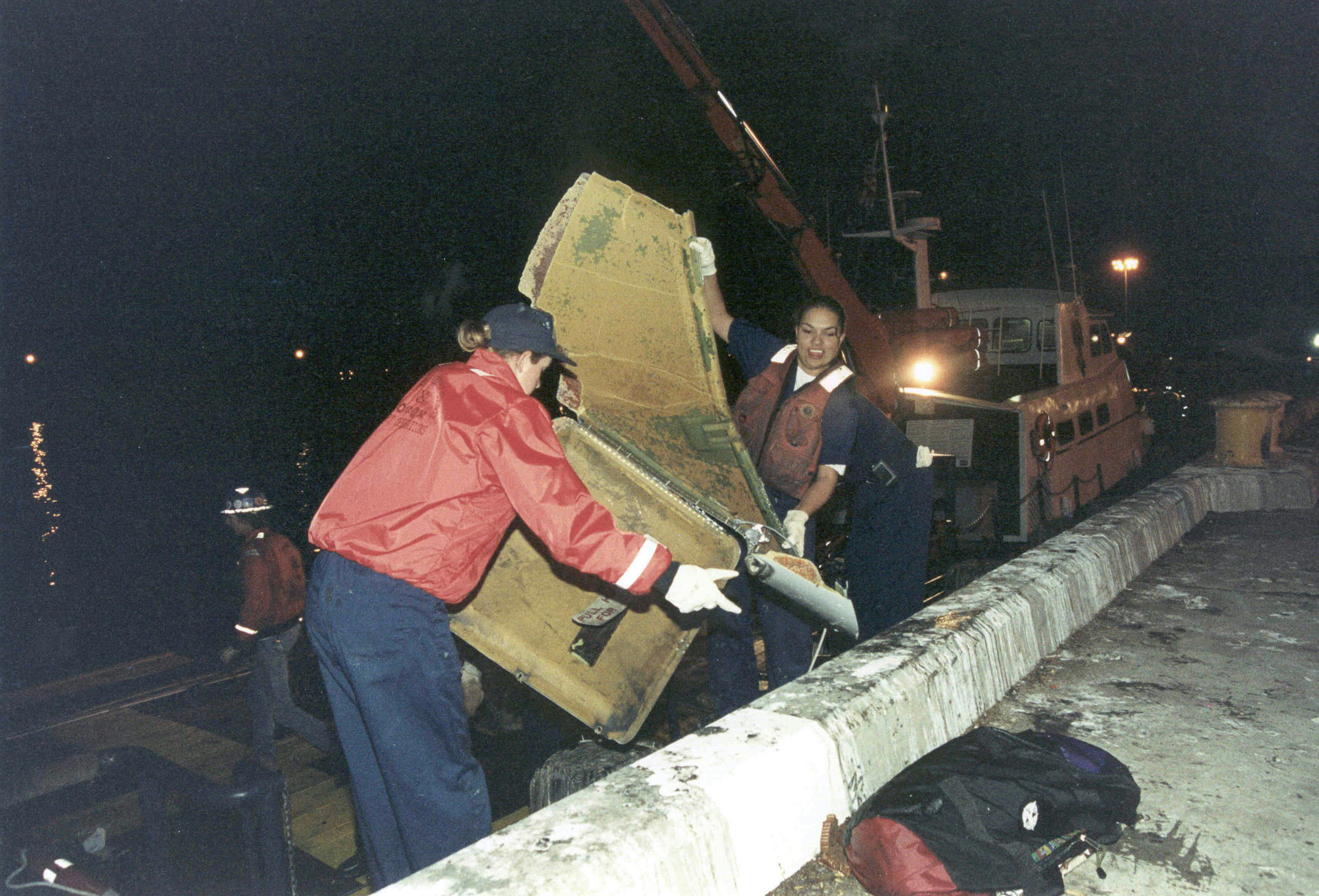
- US Navy personnel recovering a piece of the aircraft's wreckage

Accident
- Date: January 31, 2000
- Summary: Loss of control following jackscrew failure due to improper maintenance
- Site: Pacific Ocean, 2.7 mi (4.3 km) north of Anacapa Island, California, U.S.; 34°03.5′N 119°20.8′W

Aircraft
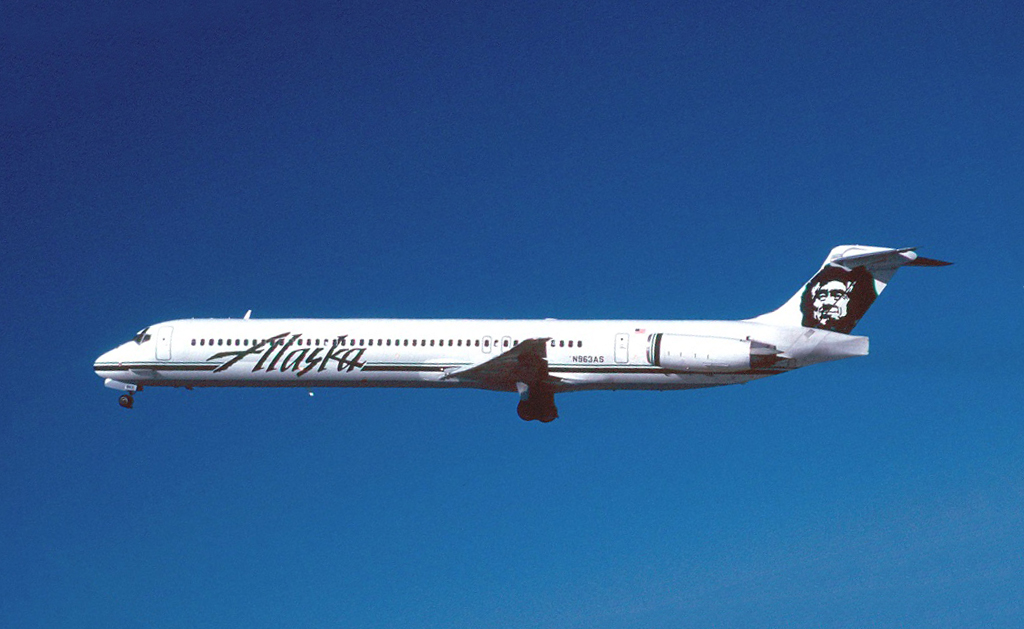
- N963AS, the aircraft involved in the accident, pictured in 1999
- Aircraft type: McDonnell Douglas MD-83
- Operator: Alaska Airlines
- IATA flight No.: AS261
- ICAO flight No.: ASA261
- Call sign: ALASKA 261
- Registration: N963AS
- Flight origin: Puerto Vallarta Int'l. Airport, Puerto Vallarta, Jalisco, Mexico
- Stopover: San Francisco Int'l. Airport, San Mateo, California, United States
- Destination: Seattle–Tacoma International Airport, Seattle, Washington, United States
- Occupants: 88
- Passengers: 83
- Crew: 5
- Fatalities: 88
- Survivors: 0

Alaska Airlines Flight 261 was a scheduled international passenger flight from Licenciado Gustavo Díaz Ordaz International Airport in Puerto Vallarta, Jalisco, Mexico, to Seattle–Tacoma International Airport near Seattle, Washington, United States, with an intermediate stop at San Francisco International Airport in San Francisco, California. On January 31, 2000, the McDonnell Douglas MD-83 operating the flight crashed into the Pacific Ocean roughly 2.7 miles (4.3 km; 2.3 nmi) north of Anacapa Island, California, following a catastrophic loss of pitch control, while attempting to divert to Los Angeles International Airport. The accident killed all 88 on board – two pilots, three cabin crew members, and 83 passengers.

The subsequent investigation by the National Transportation Safety Board (NTSB) determined that inadequate maintenance led to excessive wear and eventual failure of a critical flight control system during flight. The probable cause was stated to be "a loss of airplane pitch control resulting from the in-flight failure of the horizontal stabilizer trim system jackscrew assembly's Acme nut threads." For their efforts to save the plane, both pilots were posthumously awarded the Air Line Pilots Association Gold Medal for Heroism.

== Background ==
=== Aircraft ===
The aircraft involved in the accident was a McDonnell Douglas MD-83, serial number 53077, and registered with the tail number N963AS. The MD-83 is a longer-range version of the original MD-80 (an improved version of the DC-9), with higher weight allowances, increased fuel capacity, and more powerful Pratt & Whitney JT8D-219 engines. The aircraft had logged 26,584 flight hours and 14,315 cycles since it was delivered in 1992.

=== Crew ===
The pilots of Flight 261 were both highly experienced pilots. Captain Ted Thompson, 53, had accrued 17,750 flight hours, and had more than 4,000 hours experience as pilot-in-command in MD-80s. First Officer William "Bill" Tansky, 57, had accumulated 8,060 hours as first officer on the MD-80. Thompson had flown for Alaska Airlines for eighteen years (since 1981) and Tansky for fifteen (since 1984); neither pilot had been involved in an accident or incident prior to the crash. Both pilots lived in the Greater Los Angeles area and had previous military experience – Thompson in the U.S. Air Force and Tansky in the U.S. Navy. Three Seattle-based flight attendants: Kristin Mills (26), Craig Pulanco (30), and Allison Shanks (33), were also on board, completing the five-person crew.

=== Passengers ===
The five crew members and 47 of the passengers on board the plane were bound for Seattle. Of the remaining passengers, 30 were traveling to San Francisco; three were bound for Eugene, Oregon; and three passengers were headed for Fairbanks, Alaska. Of the passengers, one was Mexican and one was British, with all others being U.S. citizens.

At least 35 occupants of Flight 261 were connected in some manner with Alaska Airlines or its sister carrier, Horizon Air, including 12 people directly employed by the company, travelling on free or employee discounted tickets. As is common practice among airlines, off duty employees can sit in seats that would otherwise have been left empty. Employees can also grant the same privilege to their family members or friends. Bouquets of flowers started arriving at the company's headquarters in SeaTac, Washington, the day after the crash.

==== Notable passengers ====
- Jean Gandesbery, author of the book Seven Mile Lake: Scenes from a Minnesota Life, died alongside her husband, Robert.
- Cynthia Oti, an investment broker and financial talk show host at San Francisco's KSFO-AM, was killed.
- Tom Stockley, wine columnist for The Seattle Times, died alongside his wife, Margaret.
- Morris Thompson, commissioner of the Bureau of Indian Affairs in Alaska from 1973 to 1976, died alongside his wife, Thelma, and daughter, Sheryl.

== Accident flight ==
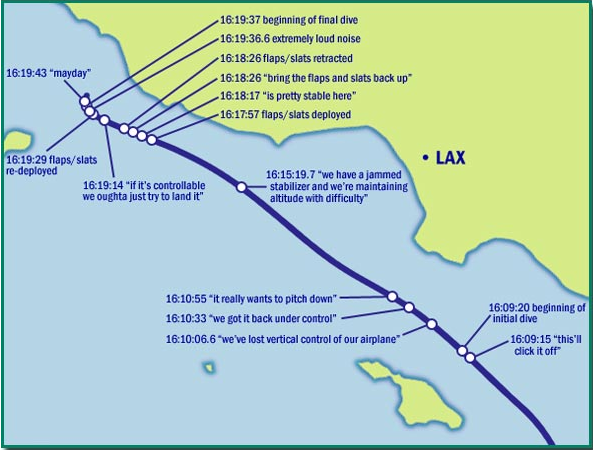
Final flight path of Alaska 261

Alaska Airlines Flight 261 departed from Puerto Vallarta's Licenciado Gustavo Díaz Ordaz International Airport at 13:37 PST (21:37 UTC), and climbed to its intended cruising altitude of flight level 310 (31,000 feet or 9,400 m). The plane was scheduled to land at San Francisco International Airport (SFO) less than 4 hours later. Sometime before 15:49 (23:49 UTC), the flight crew contacted the airline's dispatch and maintenance-control facilities in SeaTac, Washington, on a company radio frequency shared with operations and maintenance facilities at Los Angeles International Airport (LAX), to discuss a jammed horizontal stabilizer and a possible diversion to LAX. The jammed stabilizer prevented the operation of the trim system, which would normally make slight adjustments to the flight control surfaces to keep the plane stable in flight. At their cruising altitude and speed, the position of the jammed stabilizer required the pilots to pull on their yokes with about 10 lbf (44 N) of force to keep level. Neither the flight crew nor company maintenance could determine the cause of the jam. Repeated attempts to overcome the jam with the primary and alternate trim systems were unsuccessful.

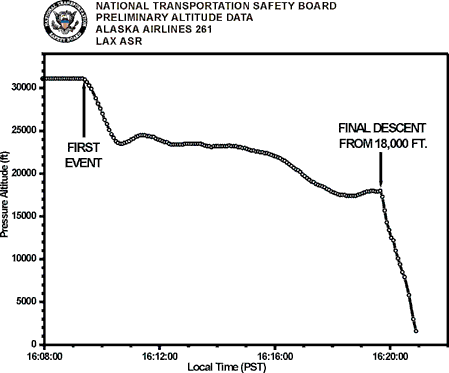
the altitude data of Flight 261

During this time, the flight crew had several discussions with the company dispatcher about whether to divert to LAX or continue on as planned to SFO. Ultimately, the pilots chose to divert. Later, the NTSB found that while "the flight crew's decision to divert the flight to Los Angeles ... was prudent and appropriate," "Alaska Airlines dispatch personnel appear to have attempted to influence the flight crew to continue to San Francisco ... instead of diverting to Los Angeles." Cockpit voice recorder (CVR) transcripts indicate that the dispatcher was concerned about the effect on the schedule ("flow"), should the flight divert.

Video animation of flight path

At 16:09 (00:09 UTC), the flight crew successfully used the primary trim system to unjam the stuck horizontal stabilizer. Upon being freed, however, it quickly moved to an extreme "nose-down" position, forcing the aircraft into a nosedive. The plane dropped from about 31,050 ft (9,460 m) to between 23,000 and 24,000 ft (7,000 and 7,300 m) in around 80 seconds. Both pilots struggled together to regain control of the aircraft, and only by pulling with 130 to 140 lbf (580 to 620 N) on the controls did the flight crew stop the 6,000 ft/min (1,800 m/min) descent of the aircraft and stabilize the MD-83 at roughly 24,400 ft (7,400 m).

Alaska 261 informed air traffic control (ATC) of their control problems. After the flight crew stated their intention to land at LAX, ATC asked whether they wanted to proceed to a lower altitude in preparation for the approach. The captain replied: "I need to get down to about ten, change my configuration, make sure I can control the jet, and I'd like to do that out here over the bay, if I may." Later, during the public hearings into the accident, the request by the pilot not to fly over populated areas was mentioned. During this time, the flight crew considered, and rejected, any further attempts to correct the runaway trim. They descended to a lower altitude, and started to configure the aircraft for landing at LAX.

Video of jackscrew failure sequence

ATC audio before and after the crash

Beginning at 16:19 (00:19 UTC), the CVR recorded the sounds of at least four distinct "thumps," followed 17 seconds later by an "extremely loud noise," as the overstrained jackscrew assembly failed completely, and the jackscrew separated from the Acme nut holding it in place. As a result, the horizontal stabilizer failed at 17,800 feet (5,400 m), and the aircraft rapidly pitched over into a dive while rolling to the left. The crippled plane had been given a block altitude, and several aircraft in the vicinity had been alerted by ATC to maintain visual contact with the stricken jet. These aircraft immediately contacted the controller. One pilot radioed, "That plane has just started to do a big huge plunge." Another reported, "Yes sir, ah, I concur. He is, uh, definitely in a nose down, uh, position, descending quite rapidly." ATC then tried to contact the plane. The crew of a SkyWest airliner reported, "He's, uh, definitely out of control." Although the CVR captured the co-pilot saying "mayday," no radio communications were received from the flight crew during the final event.

The CVR transcript reveals the pilots' constant attempts for the duration of the dive to regain control of the aircraft. After the jackscrew failed, the plane pitched –70° and was rolling over to the left. Performing an upset recovery maneuver, the captain commanded to "push and roll, push and roll," managing to increase the pitch to –28°, he stated, "ok, we are inverted...and now we gotta get it." Over the next minute, completely inverted and still diving at a –9° pitch, the crew struggled to roll the plane, with the captain calling to "push push push...push the blue side [of the attitude indicator] up," "ok now let's kick rudder...left rudder left rudder," to which the copilot responded, "I can't reach it." The captain then replied, "ok right rudder...right rudder," followed 18 seconds later by: "gotta get it over again...at least upside down we're flying."

Despite the attempt to fly the plane inverted, which almost entirely arrested its descent, the aircraft had lost too much altitude in the dive, and was far beyond recovery. A few seconds before 16:21 (00:21 UTC), Flight 261 hit the Pacific Ocean at high speed between the coastal city of Port Hueneme, California, and Anacapa Island. At this time, pilots from aircraft flying in the vicinity reported in, with one pilot saying, "and he's just hit the water." Another reported, "Ah, yes sir, he, ah, he, ah, hit the water. He's, ah, down." The aircraft was destroyed by the impact forces, and all occupants were killed by blunt-force impact trauma.

== Investigation ==
=== Wreckage recovery and analysis ===
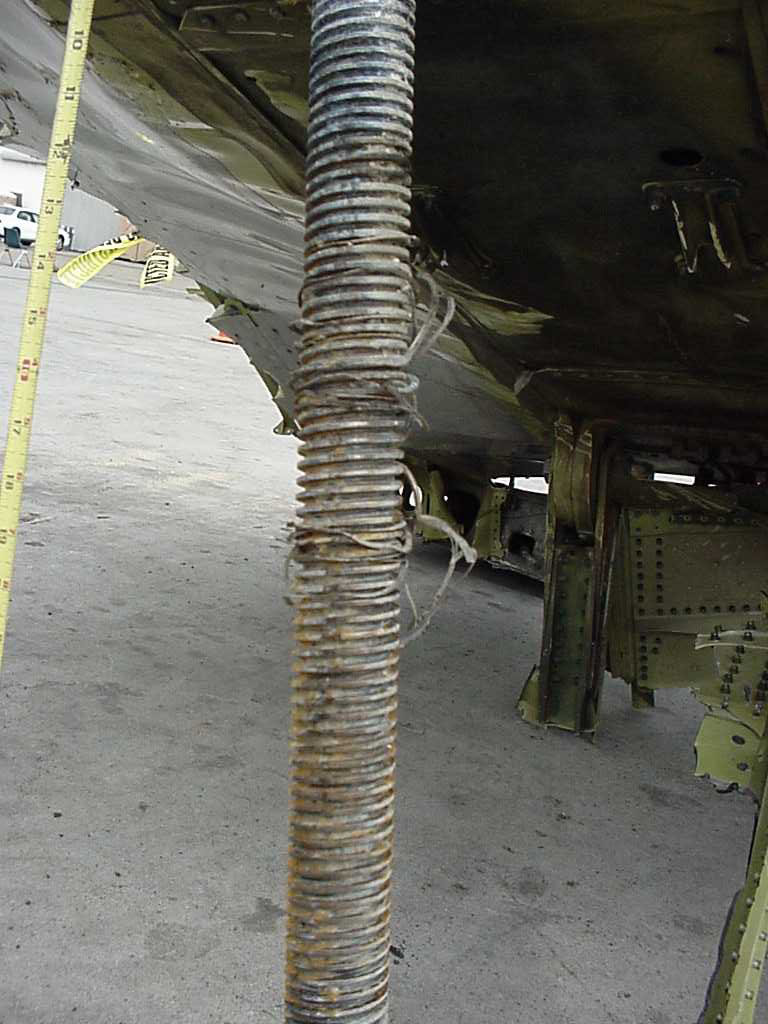
Recovered jackscrew: The spiral "wire" wrapped around the threaded portion is the remnant of the internal screw thread stripped from the acme nut.

The Austin-class amphibious transport dock USS Cleveland (LPD-7) assisted in recovery operations.

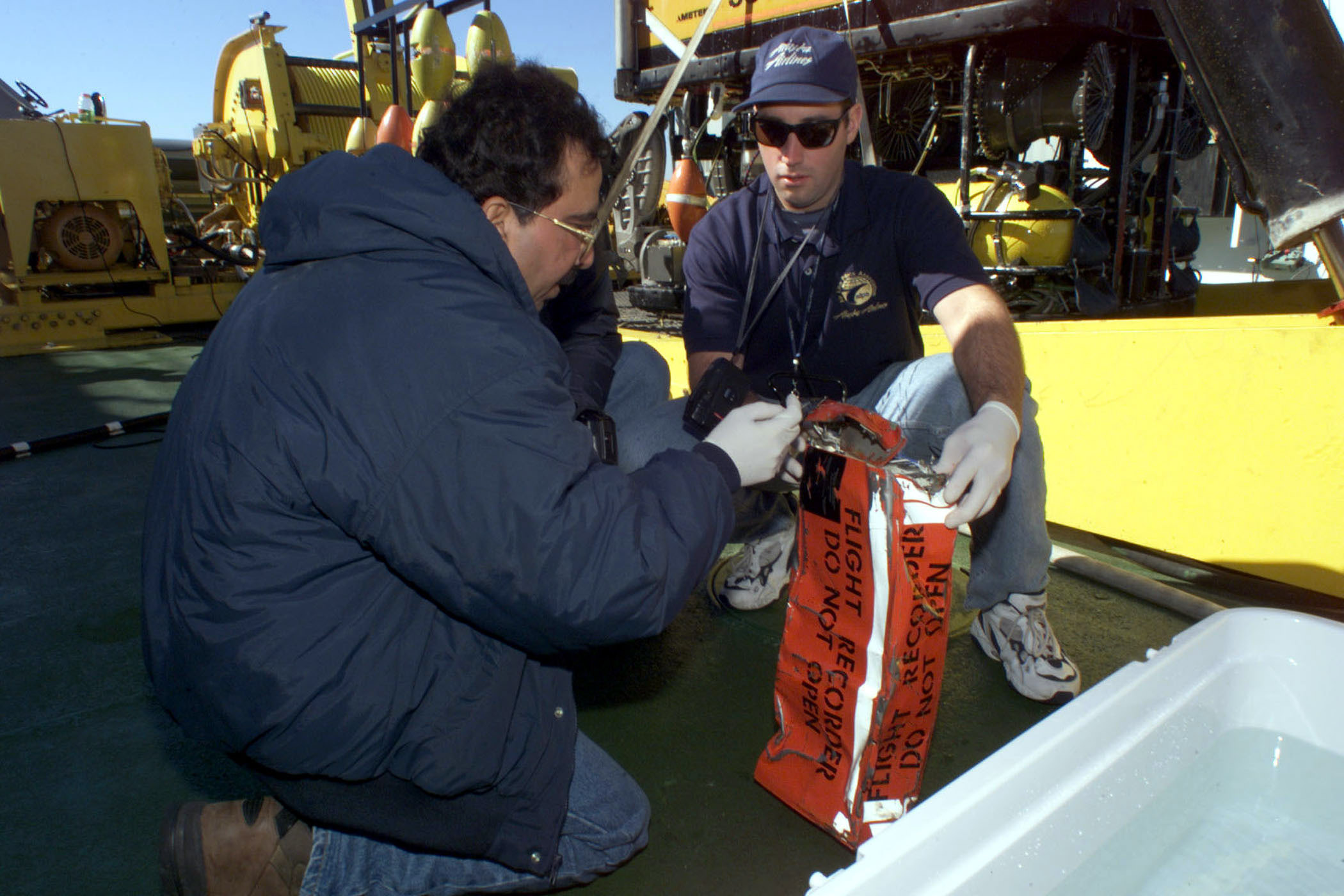
Preparation of the flight data recorder for transport from the MV Kellie Chouest on February 3, 2000.

Using side-scan sonar, remotely operated vehicles, and a commercial fishing trawler, workers recovered about 85% of the fuselage (including the tail section) and a majority of the wing components. In addition, both engines, as well as the flight data recorder and Cockpit Voice Recorder, were retrieved. All wreckage recovered from the crash site was unloaded at the Seabees' Naval Construction Battalion Center Port Hueneme, California, for examination and documentation by NTSB investigators. Both the horizontal stabilizer trim system jackscrew (also referred to as "acme screw") and the corresponding acme nut, through which the jackscrew turns, were found. The jackscrew was constructed from case-hardened steel and is 22 in (56 cm) long and 1.5 in (3.8 cm) in diameter. The acme nut was constructed from a softer copper alloy containing aluminum, nickel, and bronze. As the jackscrew rotates, it moves up or down through the (fixed) acme nut, and this linear motion moves the horizontal stabilizer for the trim system. Upon subsequent examination, the jackscrew was found to have metallic filaments wrapped around it, which were later determined to be the remains of the acme nut thread.

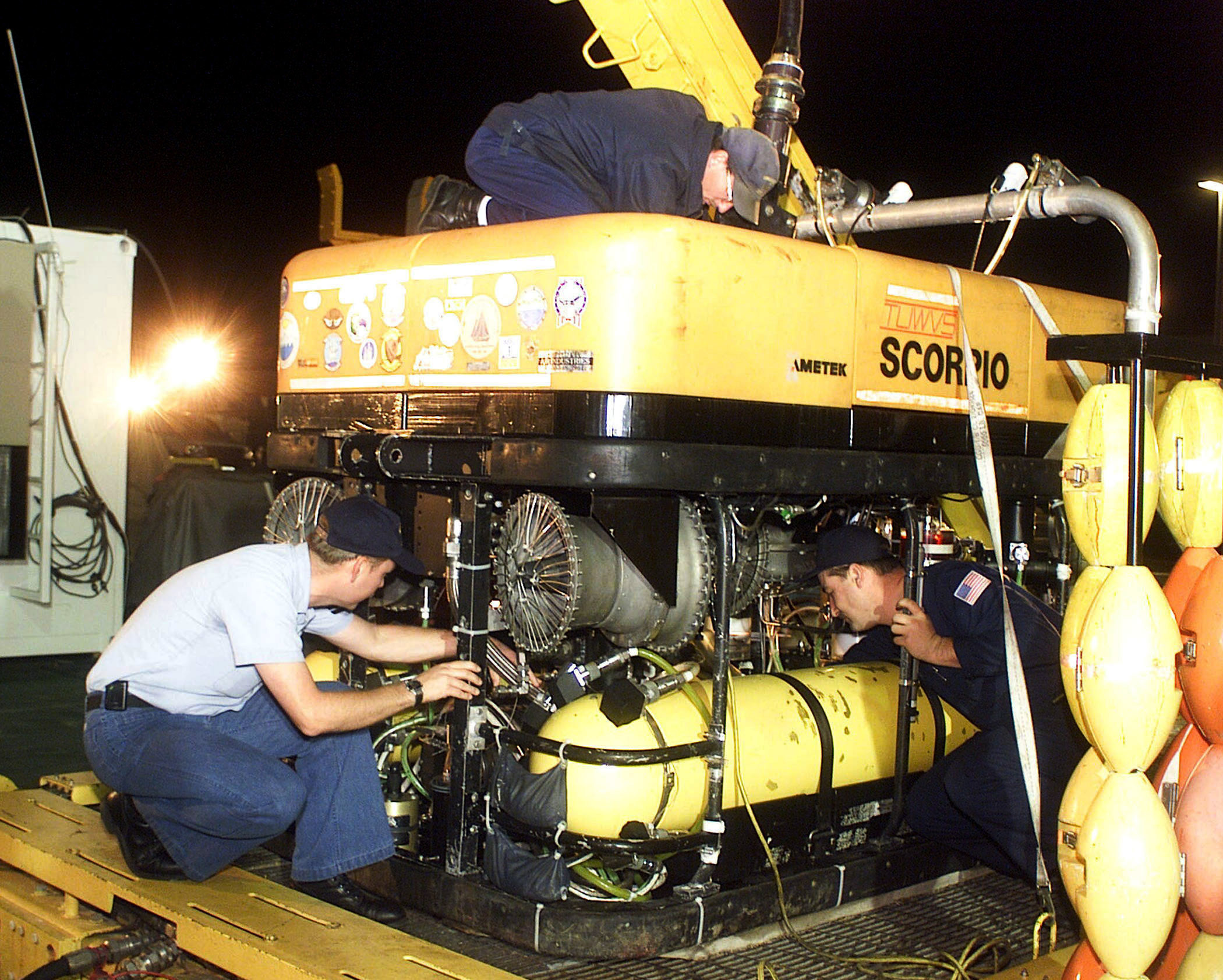
The SCORPIO ROV that was used to conduct an underwater search for the airplane's flight data recorders.

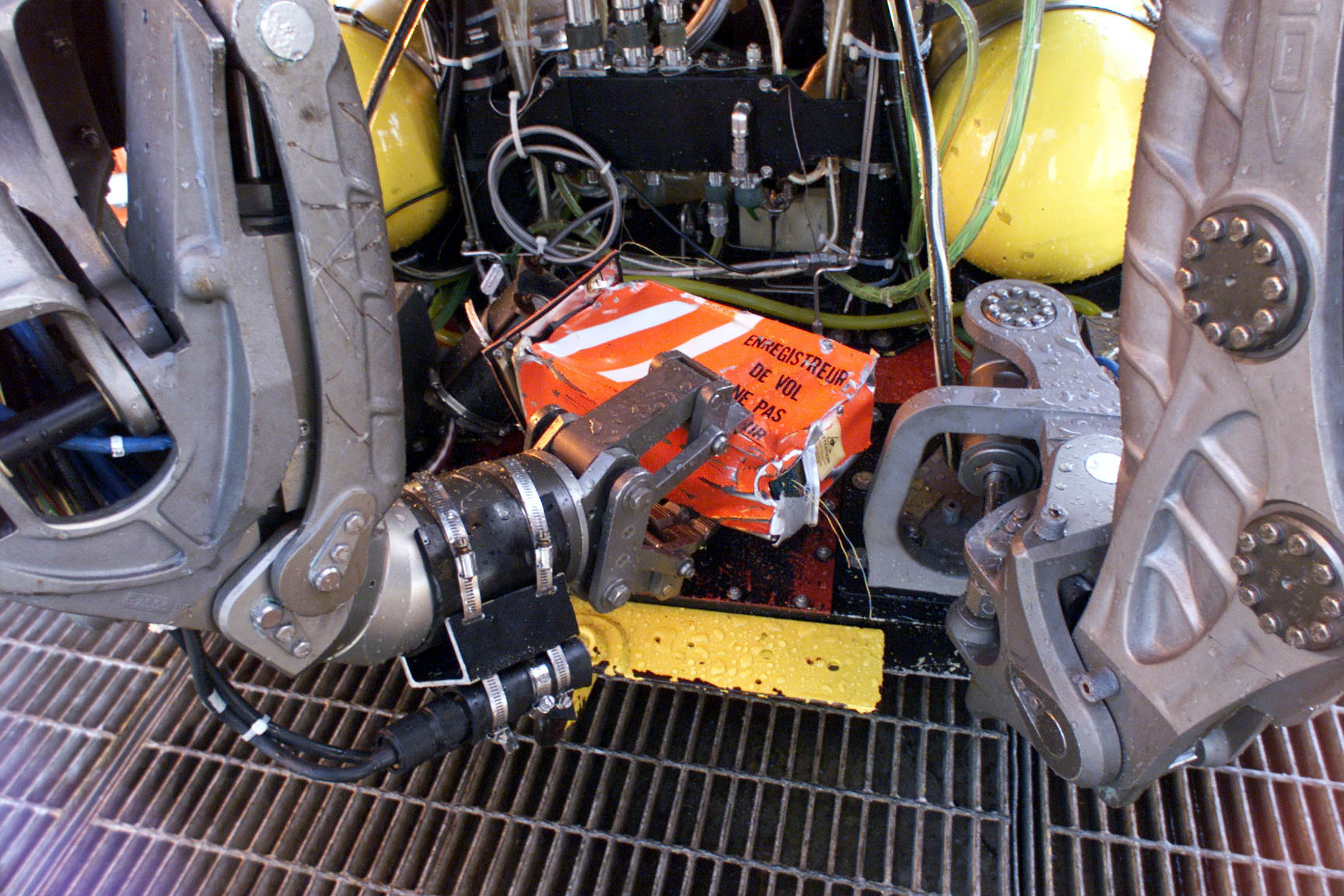
The cockpit voice recorder is held by the robotic arm of the remotely piloted vehicle SCORPIO on the deck of the MV Kellie Chouest.

Later analysis determined that approximately 90% of the thread in the acme nut had already worn away before the flight, and that it ultimately stripped while the aircraft was en route to San Francisco. Once the threads failed, the horizontal stabilizer assembly was exposed to aerodynamic forces beyond its design limits, resulting in its complete failure. Based on the interval since the last inspection of the jackscrew assembly, the NTSB concluded that the acme nut threads had worn at a rate of 0.012 inches (0.30 mm) per 1,000 flight hours – significantly higher than the expected rate of 0.001 inches (0.025 mm) per 1,000 flight hours. During the investigation, the NTSB examined several possible causes for this excessive wear, including Alaska Airlines’ substitution – approved by the manufacturer, McDonnell Douglas – of AeroShell 33 grease in place of the previously specified Mobilgrease 28. However, the use of AeroShell 33 was ultimately determined not to have contributed to the accident. Insufficient lubrication of the components was also considered as a reason for the wear. Examination of the jackscrew and acme nut revealed that no effective lubrication was present on these components at the time of the accident. Ultimately, the lack of lubrication of the acme-nut thread and the resultant excessive wear were determined to be the direct causes of the accident. Both of these circumstances resulted from Alaska Airlines' attempts to cut costs.

=== Identification of passengers ===
Due to the extreme impact forces, only a few bodies were found intact, and none were visually identifiable. All passengers were identified using fingerprints, dental records, tattoos, personal items, and anthropological examination.

=== Inadequate lubrication and end-play checks ===
The investigation sought to examine why scheduled maintenance had failed to adequately lubricate the jackscrew assembly. In interviews with the Alaska Airlines mechanic who last performed the lubrication at SFO, the task was shown to take about one hour, whereas the aircraft manufacturer estimated the task should take four hours. This and other evidence suggested to the NTSB that "the SFO mechanic who was responsible for lubricating the jackscrew assembly in September 1999 did not adequately perform the task." Laboratory tests indicated that the excessive wear of the jackscrew assembly could not have accumulated in just the four-month period between the September 1999 maintenance and the accident flight. Therefore, the NTSB concluded, "more than just the last lubrication was missed or inadequately performed."

A periodic maintenance inspection called an "end-play check" was used to monitor wear on the jackscrew assembly. The NTSB examined why the last end-play check on the accident aircraft in September 1997 did not uncover excessive wear. The investigation found that Alaska Airlines had fabricated tools to be used in the end-play check that did not meet the manufacturer's requirements. Testing revealed that the nonstandard tools ("restraining fixtures") used by Alaska Airlines could result in inaccurate measurements, and that if accurate measurements had been obtained at the time of the last inspection, these measurements possibly would have indicated the excessive wear and the need to replace the affected components.

=== Extension of maintenance intervals ===
Between 1985 and 1996, Alaska Airlines progressively increased the period between both jackscrew lubrication and end-play checks, with the approval of the Federal Aviation Administration (FAA). Since each lubrication or end-play check subsequently not conducted had represented an opportunity to adequately lubricate the jackscrew or detect excessive wear, the NTSB examined the justification of these extensions. In the case of extended lubrication intervals, the investigation could not determine what information, if any, was presented by Alaska Airlines to the FAA prior to 1996. Testimony from an FAA inspector regarding an extension granted in 1996 was that Alaska Airlines submitted documentation from McDonnell Douglas as justification for their extension.

End-play checks were conducted during a periodic comprehensive airframe overhaul process called a C-check. Testimony from the director of reliability and maintenance programs of Alaska Airlines was that a data-analysis package based on the maintenance history of five sample aircraft was submitted to the FAA to justify the extended period between C-checks. Individual maintenance tasks (such as the end-play check) were not separately considered in this extension. The NTSB found: "Alaska Airlines' end-play check interval extension should have been, but was not, supported by adequate technical data to demonstrate that the extension would not present a potential hazard."

=== FAA oversight ===
A special inspection conducted by the NTSB in April 2000 of Alaska Airlines uncovered widespread significant deficiencies that "the FAA should have uncovered earlier." The investigation concluded, "FAA surveillance of Alaska Airlines had been deficient for at least several years." The NTSB noted that in July 2001, an FAA panel determined that Alaska Airlines had corrected the previously identified deficiencies. However, several factors led the board to question "the depth and effectiveness of Alaska Airlines' corrective actions," and "the overall adequacy of Alaska Airlines' maintenance program."

Systemic problems were identified by the investigation into the FAA's oversight of maintenance programs, including: inadequate staffing, its approval process of maintenance interval extensions, and the aircraft certification requirements.

=== Aircraft design and certification issues ===
The jackscrew assembly was designed with two independent threads, each of which was strong enough to withstand the forces placed on it. Maintenance procedures, such as lubrication and end-play checks, were to catch any excessive wear before it progressed to a point of failure of the system. The aircraft designers assumed that at least one set of threads would always be present to carry the loads placed on it; therefore, the effects of catastrophic failure of this system were not considered, and no "fail-safe" provisions were needed.

For this design component to be approved ("certified") by the FAA without any fail-safe provision, a failure had to be considered "extremely improbable." This was defined as "having a probability on the order of 1×10^{−9} or less each flight hour." The accident showed that certain wear mechanisms could affect both sets of threads, and that the wear might not be detected. The NTSB determined that the design of "the horizontal stabilizer jackscrew assembly did not account for the loss of the acme-nut threads as a catastrophic single-point failure mode."

=== Jackscrew design improvement ===
In 2001, the National Aeronautics and Space Administration (NASA) recognized the risk to its hardware (such as the Space Shuttle) that was dependent on the use of similar jackscrews. An engineering fix developed by engineers of NASA and the United Space Alliance promised to make progressive failures more easily identifiable through multiple methods, including visual inspections, the use of depth measuring tools, and electronic or mechanical wear monitors. Additionally, the redesigned "fail-safe" jack screw concept "call[ed] for the incorporation of a redundant follower nut that would assume the axial jack load upon failure of the primary nut." The "fail-safe" jackscrew modifications would allow for the maintenance and monitoring of the jackscrews more readily accessible, and thus complete failures of a jackscrew less likely.

=== John Liotine ===
In 1998, an Alaska Airlines mechanic named John Liotine, who worked in the Alaska Airlines maintenance center in Oakland, California, told the FAA that supervisors were approving records of maintenance that they were not allowed to approve or that indicated work had been completed when, in fact, it had not. Liotine began working with federal investigators by secretly audio recording his supervisors. On December 22, 1998, federal authorities raided an Alaska Airlines property and seized maintenance records. In August 1999, Alaska Airlines put Liotine on paid leave, and in 2000, Liotine filed a libel suit against the airline. The crash of AS261 became a part of the federal investigation against Alaska Airlines, because, in 1997, Liotine had recommended that the jackscrew and gimbal nut of the accident aircraft be replaced, but had been overruled by another supervisor. In December 2001, federal prosecutors stated that they were not going to file criminal charges against Alaska Airlines. Around that time, Alaska Airlines agreed to settle the libel suit by paying about $500,000; as part of the settlement, Liotine resigned.

== Conclusions ==
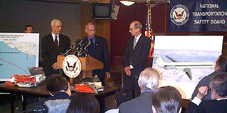
NTSB Chairman Jim Hall, along with members Dr. Vern Ellingstad (left), and Dr. Bernard Loeb (right) with the Cockpit Voice Recorder and Flight Data Recorder of Flight 261

In addition to the probable cause, the NTSB found these contributing factors:

- Alaska Airlines extended its lubrication interval for its McDonnell Douglas MD-80 horizontal stabilizer components based on McDonnell Douglas's recommendation, and the FAA approved the extended schedule. This increased the likelihood that a missed or inadequate lubrication would result in the near complete deterioration of the jackscrew-assembly acme-nut threads. The extended lubrication interval was a direct cause of the excessive wear and contributed to the Alaska Airlines Flight 261 accident.
- Alaska Airlines extended the end-play check interval and the FAA approved the change. This allowed the acme-nut threads to deteriorate to the point of failure without the opportunity for detection.
- The absence on the McDonnell Douglas MD-80 of a fail-safe mechanism to prevent the catastrophic effects of total acme nut loss.

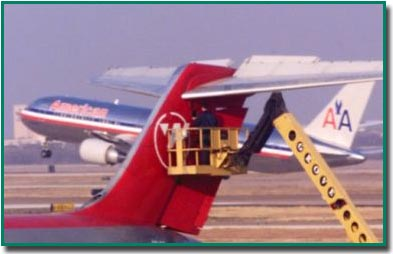
Routine maintenance of the tail section of a Northwest Airlines DC-9, predecessor of the MD-83.

During the course of the investigation, and later in its final report, the NTSB issued 24 safety recommendations, covering maintenance, regulatory oversight, and aircraft design issues. More than half of these were directly related to jackscrew lubrication and end-play measurement. Also included was a recommendation that pilots were to be instructed that in the event of a flight-control system malfunction, they should not attempt corrective procedures beyond those specified in the checklist procedures, and in particular, in the event of a horizontal stabilizer trim-control system malfunction, the primary and alternate trim motors should not be activated, and if unable to correct the problem through the checklists, they should land at the nearest suitable airport.

In NTSB board member John J. Goglia's statement for the final report, with which the other three board members concurred, he wrote:

This is a maintenance accident. Alaska Airlines' maintenance and inspection of its horizontal stabilizer activation system were poorly conceived and woefully executed. The failure was compounded by poor oversight ... Had any of the managers, mechanics, inspectors, supervisors, or FAA overseers whose job it was to protect this mechanism done their job conscientiously, this accident cannot happen ... NTSB has made several specific maintenance recommendations, some already accomplished, that will, if followed, prevent the recurrence of this particular accident. But maintenance, poorly done, will find a way to bite somewhere else.

== Aftermath ==
After the crash, Alaska Airlines management stated that they hoped to handle the aftermath in a manner similar to that conducted by Swissair after the Swissair Flight 111 accident. They wished to avoid mistakes made by Trans World Airlines in the aftermath of the TWA Flight 800 accident, such as failure to provide timely information to and treat with compassion families of the victims. Steve Miletich of The Seattle Times wrote that the western portion of Washington "had never before experienced such a loss from a plane crash". The airline retired the last of its MD-80s in 2008, converting to using exclusively Boeing 737s.

=== Liability ===
Both Boeing (who had acquired McDonnell Douglas through a merger in 1997) and Alaska Airlines eventually accepted liability for the crash, and all but one of the lawsuits brought by surviving family members were settled out of court before going to trial. While the financial terms of settlements were not officially disclosed, The Seattle Times reported the total amount to be in excess of US$300 million, covered entirely by insurance. According to other sources, the individual settlements were "anywhere from a couple million dollars up to $20 million", purportedly "among the largest ever in an air disaster". Candy Hatcher of the Seattle Post-Intelligencer wrote: "Many lost faith in Alaska Airlines, a homegrown company that had taken pride in its safety record and billed itself as a family airline."

=== Memorials ===
Captain Thompson and First Officer Tansky were both posthumously awarded the Air Line Pilots Association Gold Medal for Heroism, in recognition of their actions during the emergency. The Ted Thompson/Bill Tansky Scholarship Fund was named in memory of the two pilots.

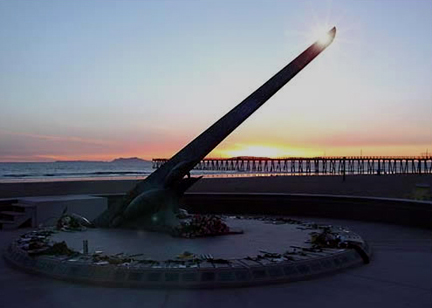
Memorial sundial in Port Hueneme, California

The victims' families approved the construction of a memorial sundial, designed by Santa Barbara artist James "Bud" Bottoms, which was placed at Port Hueneme on the California coast near where the crash occurred. The names of each of the victims are engraved on individual bronze plates mounted on the perimeter of the dial. The sundial casts a shadow on a memorial plaque at 16:22 each January 31.

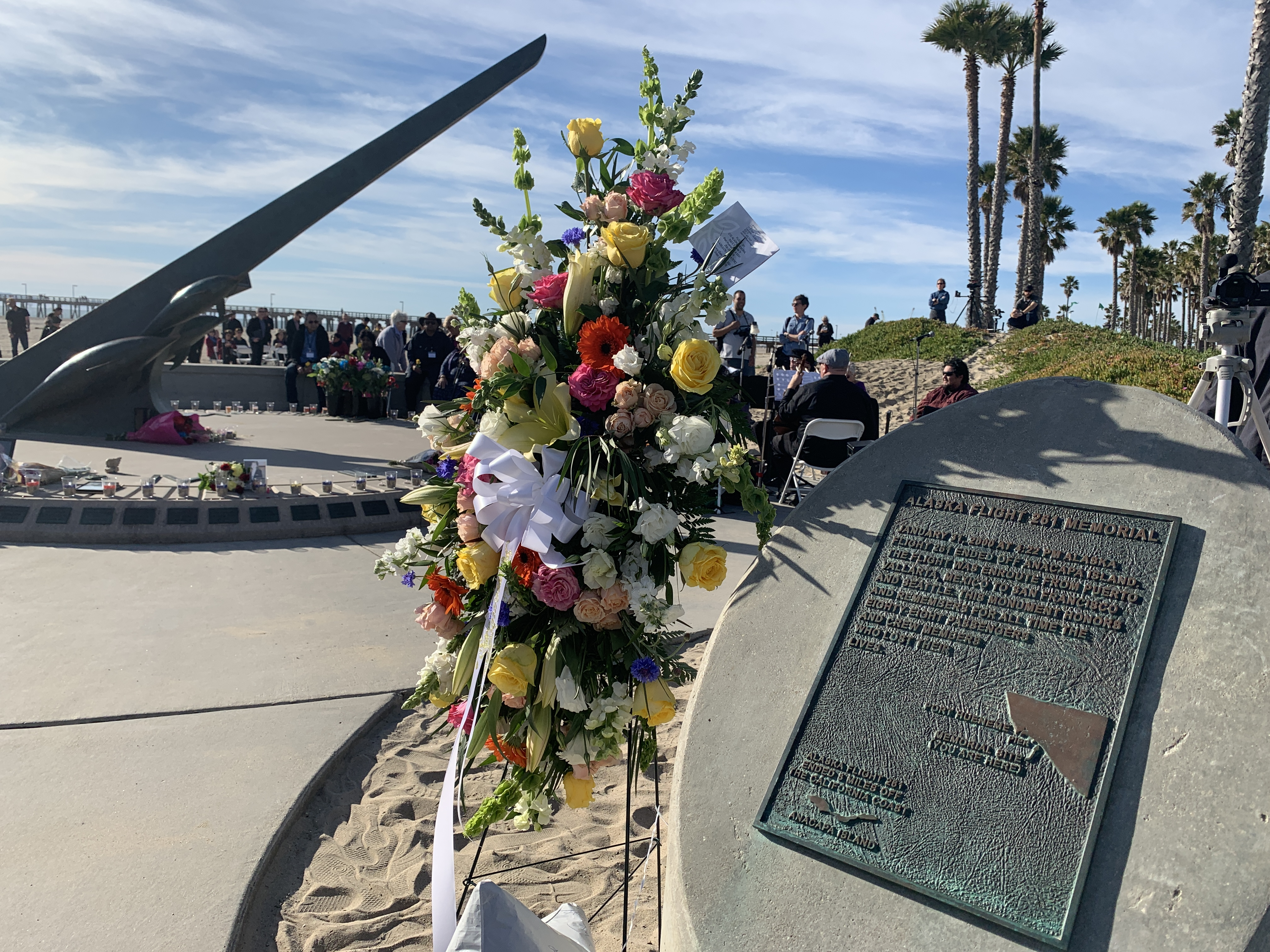
A memorial service at the memorial sundial in 2020

Many residents of Seattle had been deeply affected by the disaster. As part of a memorial vigil in 2000, a column of light was beamed from the top of the Space Needle. Students and faculty at John Hay Elementary School in Queen Anne, Seattle, held a memorial for four Hay students who were killed in the crash. In April 2001, John Hay Elementary dedicated the "John Hay Pathway Garden" as a permanent memorial to the students and their families killed on Flight 261. The City of Seattle public park Soundview Terrace was renovated in honor of the four Pearson and six Clemetson family members who were killed on board Flight 261 from the same Seattle neighborhood of Queen Anne. The park's playground was named "Rachel's Playground" in memory of six-year-old Rachel Pearson, who had often been seen playing at the park.

=== Attempted fraud ===
Two victims were falsely named in paternity suits as the fathers of children in Guatemala in an attempt to gain insurance and settlement money. Subsequent DNA testing proved these claims to be false.

The crash has appeared in various advance-fee fraud email scams (also known as "419" or "Nigerian prince" scams), in which a scammer uses the name of someone who died in the crash, claiming to be a lawyer or estate representative for the deceased in order to lure unsuspecting victims into sending money to the scammer by claiming the crash victim left huge amounts of unclaimed funds in a foreign bank account. The names of Morris Thompson and Ronald and Joyce Lake were used in schemes of this nature in the years following the crash.

== In popular culture ==
- In the Canadian TV series Mayday (called Air Emergency and Air Disasters in the U.S. and Air Crash Investigation in the UK and elsewhere around the world), the flight was featured in the season 1 (2003) episode "Cutting Corners". The dramatization was broadcast in the United States with the title "Fatal Error". The flight was also included in a Mayday season 6 (2007) Science of Disaster special titled "Fatal Flaw", which was called "Fatal Fix" in the United Kingdom, Australia, and Asia. The crash was covered again (with an entirely new cast) in season 22, episode 5 of Mayday, titled "Pacific Plunge".
- The film drama Flight (2012) featured an airplane crash of an aircraft resembling an MD-83, which flies inverted and ultimately crash lands, though the film's version recorded just six fatalities (four passengers, two crew) of the 102 persons aboard. In the film, NTSB investigators determine the probable cause of this crash to be the fatigue of a jackscrew due to excess wear and poor maintenance. The final seconds of the CVR of Flight 261 indicates the plane stabilized and was flying inverted shortly before the crash, an event depicted in the film. Screenwriter John Gatins later explained that the film's featured crash was "loosely inspired" by the events of Flight 261.

== See also ==
- Aeroflot Flight 8641 – accident resulting from a jackscrew failure
- Emery Worldwide Flight 17 – loss of pitch control due to improper maintenance procedures
- Japan Air Lines Flight 123 – severe structural failure years after an improper repair
- China Airlines Flight 611 – another accident caused by similar improper maintenance as Flight 261 leading to inflight break-up two years later
