= Russian rescue ship KIL-168 =

History

Russia
- Name: KIL-168
- Builder: Neptun Werft, Rostock, East Germany
- Launched: 30 September 1989
- Commissioned: 5 October 1990
- Identification: IMO number: 9030175
- Status: in active service, as of 2012

General characteristics
- Class & type: Kashtan-class large mooring/buoy tender
- Displacement: 4,200 long tons (4,267 t) standard; 6,200 long tons (6,299 t) full load
- Length: 97.83 m (321 ft 0 in)
- Beam: 18.2 m (59 ft 9 in)
- Draught: 5.7 m (18 ft 8 in)
- Propulsion: Diesel-electric; 5 × 775 kW (1,039 hp) diesel generators; 2 × 240 kW (322 hp) diesel generators; 2 × 1,500 hp (1,119 kW) electric motors
- Speed: 13.5 knots (25.0 km/h; 15.5 mph)
- Range: 2,000 nmi (3,700 km; 2,300 mi) at 11 kn (20 km/h; 13 mph)
- Endurance: 45 days
- Complement: 47
- Sensors & processing systems: MR-201 navigation radar

KIL-168 is a Project 141 (NATO reporting name: Kashtan class) large mooring/buoy tender of the Russian Navy, built by the Neptun Werft Shipyard in Rostock, East Germany, launched on 30 September 1989, and commissioned on 5 October 1990.

The Kashtan class tenders were developed from the Sura class, and are equipped with a 100-ton heavy lift gantry at the stern.

KIL-168 is attached to the 34th Rescue Ships Brigade, Pacific Fleet and based at Vladivostok. In August 2005, it served as support in the rescue of the DSRV AS-28 after it became tangled in underwater antenna cables.
