= Russian submarine AS-26 =

Priz-class deep-submergence rescue vehicle

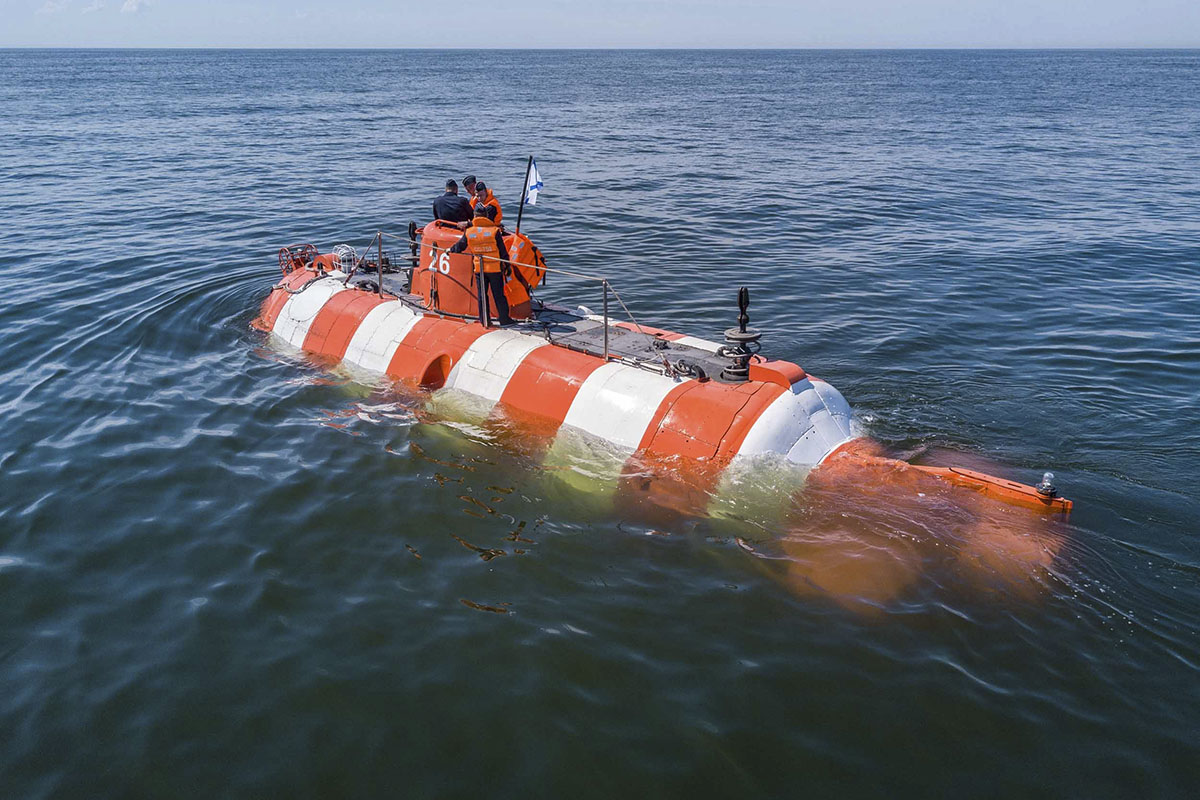
- AS-26 during a 2020 rescue exercise

History

Russia
- Name: AS-26
- Laid down: April 1986
- Launched: 27 August 1987
- Commissioned: 25 November 1987
- Status: Active

General characteristics
- Class & type: Priz-class deep-submergence rescue vehicle
- Displacement: 55 t (54 long tons)
- Length: 13.5 m (44 ft 3 in)
- Beam: 3.8 m (12 ft 6 in)
- Height: 4.6 m (15 ft 1 in)
- Speed: 3.3 knots (6.1 km/h; 3.8 mph) maximum; 2.3 knots (4.3 km/h; 2.6 mph) cruise; 0.5 m/s (1.6 ft/s) ascent speed
- Range: 21 nmi (39 km; 24 mi)
- Endurance: 120 hours with 4 aboard; 10 hours with 24 aboard
- Test depth: 1,000 m (3,300 ft)
- Capacity: 20 passengers
- Crew: 5

AS-26 is a Priz-class deep-submergence rescue vehicle (DSRV), or rescue mini-submarine, which went into service in 1987. The DSRV first entered service with the Soviet Navy but became part of the Russian Navy after the dissolution of the Soviet Union.

== Operations ==
Before June 1995 AS-26 was first assigned to the Soviet and then to Russia's Northern Fleet. From then on the DSRV was assigned to Russia's Baltic Fleet.

It is deployed from the Kashtan-class salvage ship SS-750. The two have participated in submarine rescue exercises in the Baltic Sea.

On 22 September 2022, the AS-26 and its mother ship SS-750 were observed by the Royal Danish Navy patrol boat HDMS Nymfen above the route of the Nord Stream 2 gas pipeline four days before the pipeline was sabotaged.

== Gallery ==
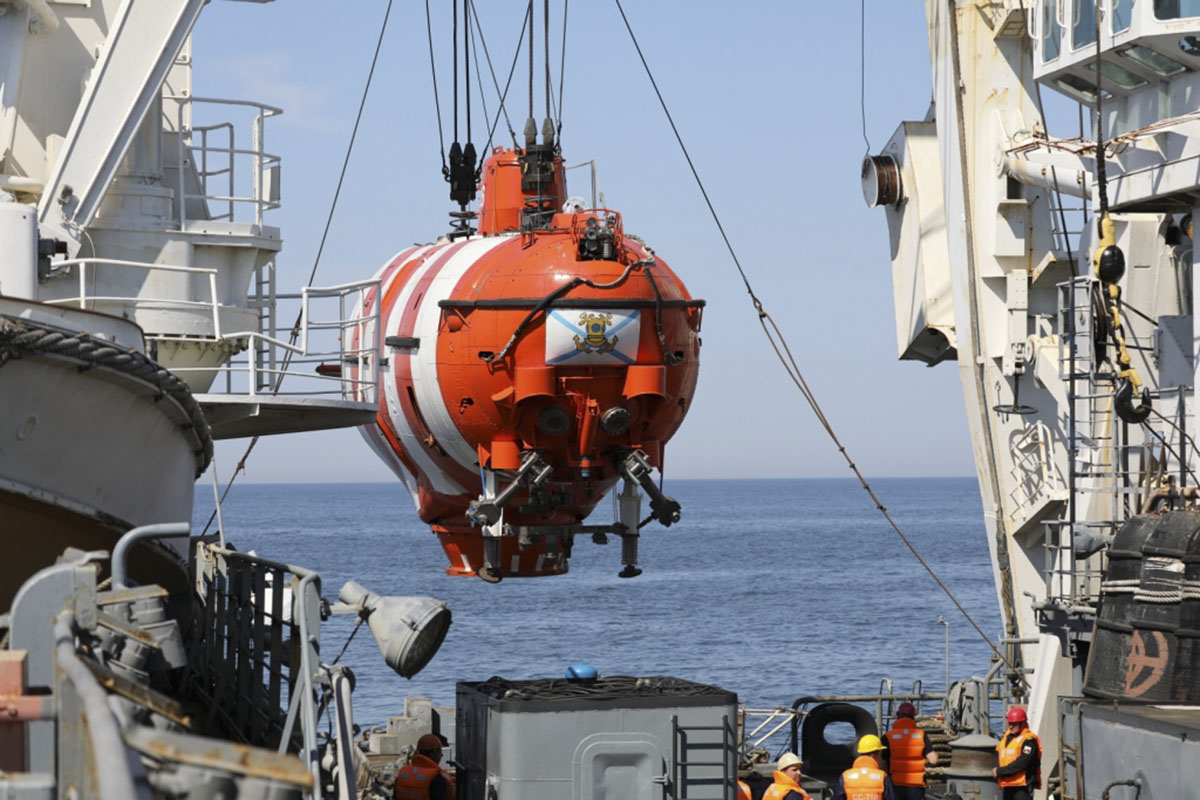
AS-26 hanging from the crane of SS-750 in 2020

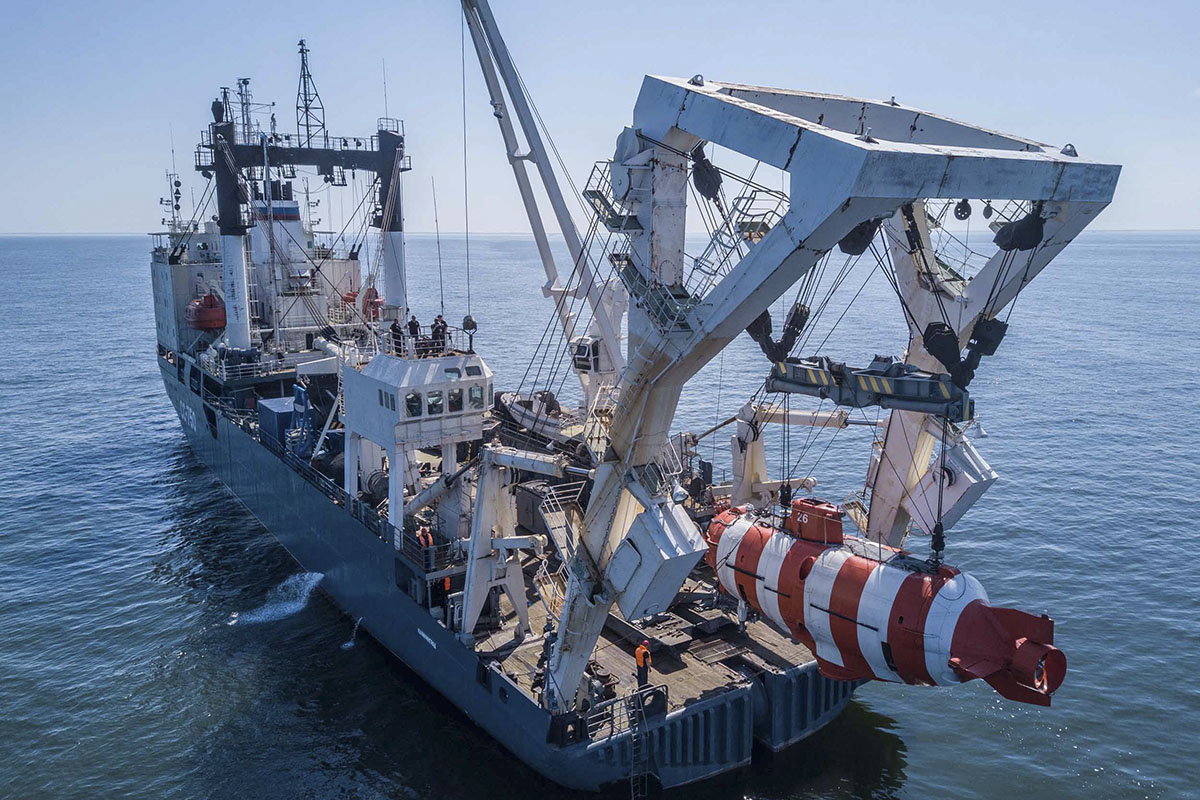
AS-26 being launched in the Baltic Sea in 2020
