= MV Kellie Chouest =

1996 American diving support vessel

History

United States
- Name: MV Kellie Chouest
- Builder: Edison Chouest Offshore
- Launched: 1978
- Acquired: Leased, 1996
- Identification: IMO number: 9132179; MMSI number: 366331000; Callsign: WCV9914
- Status: In service

General characteristics
- Type: Deep Submergence Elevator Support Ship
- Displacement: 1,575 long tons (1,600 t)
- Length: 310 ft (94 m)
- Beam: 52 ft (16 m)
- Draft: 15 ft (4.6 m)
- Speed: 13 knots (24 km/h; 15 mph)
- Complement: 13 civilian, 40 military

MV Kellie Chouest is a Deep Submergence Elevator Support Ship operated under the Military Sealift Command's Special Mission Ship Program and leased from Edison Chouest Offshore. It is assigned to COMSUBDEVRON FIVE for deep water rescue, salvage and research missions.

Kellie Chouest helped in the recovery operations of the stricken USS Dolphin after a flooding and fire of the latter vessel. She also assisted in the recovery of Alaska Airlines Flight 261 voice and flight data recorders, and of USS Monitor's propeller and shaft.

In 2002, High Performance Wireless Research and Education Network researchers conducted an expedition to locate the SEALAB II/III habitat located off Scripps Pier in La Jolla, California. Researchers utilized a Scorpio ROV to find the site and were able to conduct a live multicast from ship to shore. This expedition was the first return to the site since the habitat was moved.
