= Morris Thompson =

Alaska Native leader (1939–2000)

- Thompson in September 1998

41st Commissioner of Indian Affairs
- In office December 4, 1973 – November 3, 1976
- President: Richard Nixon; Gerald Ford
- Preceded by: Louis R. Bruce Jr.
- Succeeded by: Ben Reifel

Personal details
- Born: September 11, 1939 Tanana, Territory of Alaska, United States
- Died: January 31, 2000 (aged 60) Near Anacapa Island, Pacific Ocean
- Spouse: Thelma Thompson (1963–2000)
- Children: Sheryl (daughter), Nicole Thompson (daughter)

Morris "Morrie" Thompson (September 11, 1939 – January 31, 2000) was an Alaska Native leader, American businessman and political appointee working on matters related to Alaska Natives. Thompson was best known as the official in charge of the Bureau of Indian Affairs for the U.S. state of Alaska during the 1970s, and later as head of Doyon, Limited, the Alaska Native Regional Corporation for Interior Alaska. Following his retirement from Doyon, while returning to Alaska from vacationing in Mexico, Thompson died, along with his wife and one of his three daughters, in the infamous crash of Alaska Airlines Flight 261.

== Early life and career ==
Thompson was born on September 11, 1939, in Tanana, Alaska, the son of Warren H. Thompson, a white American originally from Indiana, and his wife Alice (née Grant), a Koyukon Athabaskan. Thompson graduated from Mt. Edgecumbe High School in Sitka and attended the University of Alaska Fairbanks as a civil engineering major. "Morrie" married Thelma Mayo of Rampart on October 5, 1963 in Tanana, then obtained a job at RCA's Gilmore Creek Satellite Tracking Station near Fairbanks in 1964 after attending an RCA electrical technician school in Los Angeles, California.

In 1966, Thompson met Walter Hickel, an Anchorage businessman who was running for governor at the time; Morris volunteered to work on Hickel's campaign in Fairbanks and the Interior. As a result, Thompson became Governor Hickel's deputy director of the Rural Development Agency. The next year as executive director of Hickel's North Commission, Thompson began working on a network of transportation routes to open rural Alaska to development.

When President Nixon named Hickel to serve as Secretary of the Interior in 1969, Thompson went to Washington, D.C., as special assistant for the Bureau of Indian Affairs. In 1970, young Thompson became the Bureau of Indian Affairs Area Director in Juneau. In both Interior jobs, Thompson was deeply involved in the Alaska Native Claims Settlement Act adopted in December 1971. Thompson served as the youngest Commissioner of the Bureau of Indian Affairs at 34 years of age.

In 1981, Thompson went to work for Doyon, Limited, his ANCSA Regional Corporation. Originally hired as a Vice-President, he became Doyon's President and Chief Officer in 1985, when Doyon Ltd. had an operating loss of $28 million. When he retired in 2000, Doyon was generating $70.9 million in annual revenues, had 900 employees and 14,000 shareholders. Morris Thompson was widely recognized in Alaska as a Native American leader.

== Death ==
At 60 years of age, a resident of Fairbanks, Thompson retired as the President of Doyon. To celebrate his retirement, he went on vacation with his wife Thelma and his daughter Sheryl to Mexico. He died with his wife and daughter in the crash of Alaska Airlines Flight 261 on January 31, 2000, while flying back to the United States.

Thompson's body was buried in Tanana.

Advance fee fraud (419, Nigerian scam) con men used Thompson's name in various scams unrelated to Thompson. The Alaska Federation of Natives altered one of its web pages to warn e-mail users about the scheme.

== Legacy ==
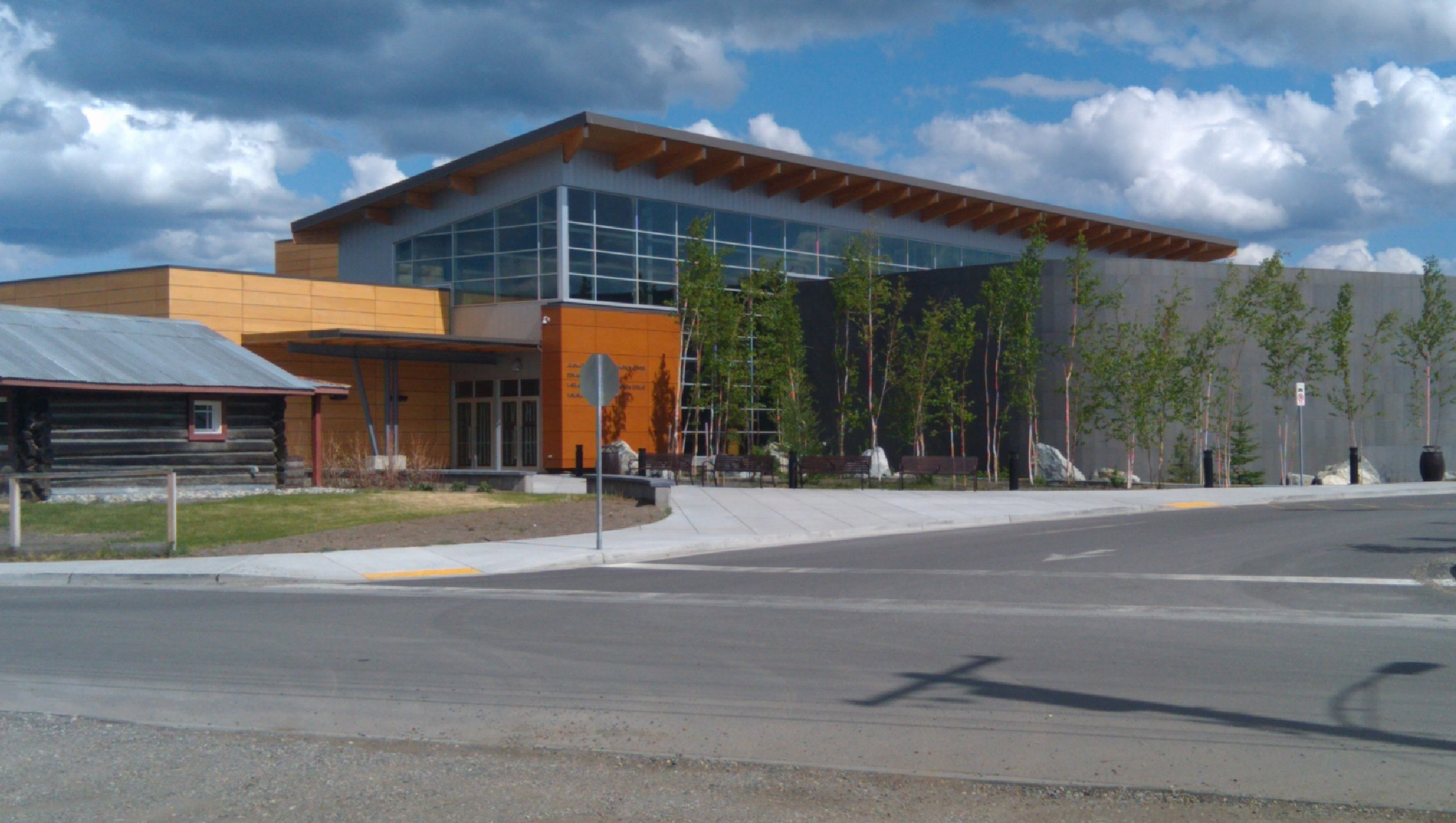
The Morris Thompson Center.

The Morris Thompson Cultural and Visitors Center, located at 101 Dunkel Street in downtown Fairbanks and dedicated on August 12, 2008, is named after Thompson.

Prior to this, the University of Alaska Fairbanks had moved its southern access a half-mile to the west, citing problems with the bridge over the Alaska Railroad on the existing access road. The new access road was named Thompson Drive in his honor. Thompson had served on the University of Alaska Board of Regents from 1989 to 1993.

The Morris Thompson Golf Classic is an annual fundraiser established and hosted by Doyon Foundation. It honors the memory of the late Morris Thompson while raising money for the memorial scholarship fund in his name. Since inception, the event has funded 209 scholarships totaling $515,180.
