= Kashtan-class salvage vessel =

Class of submersible support vessels

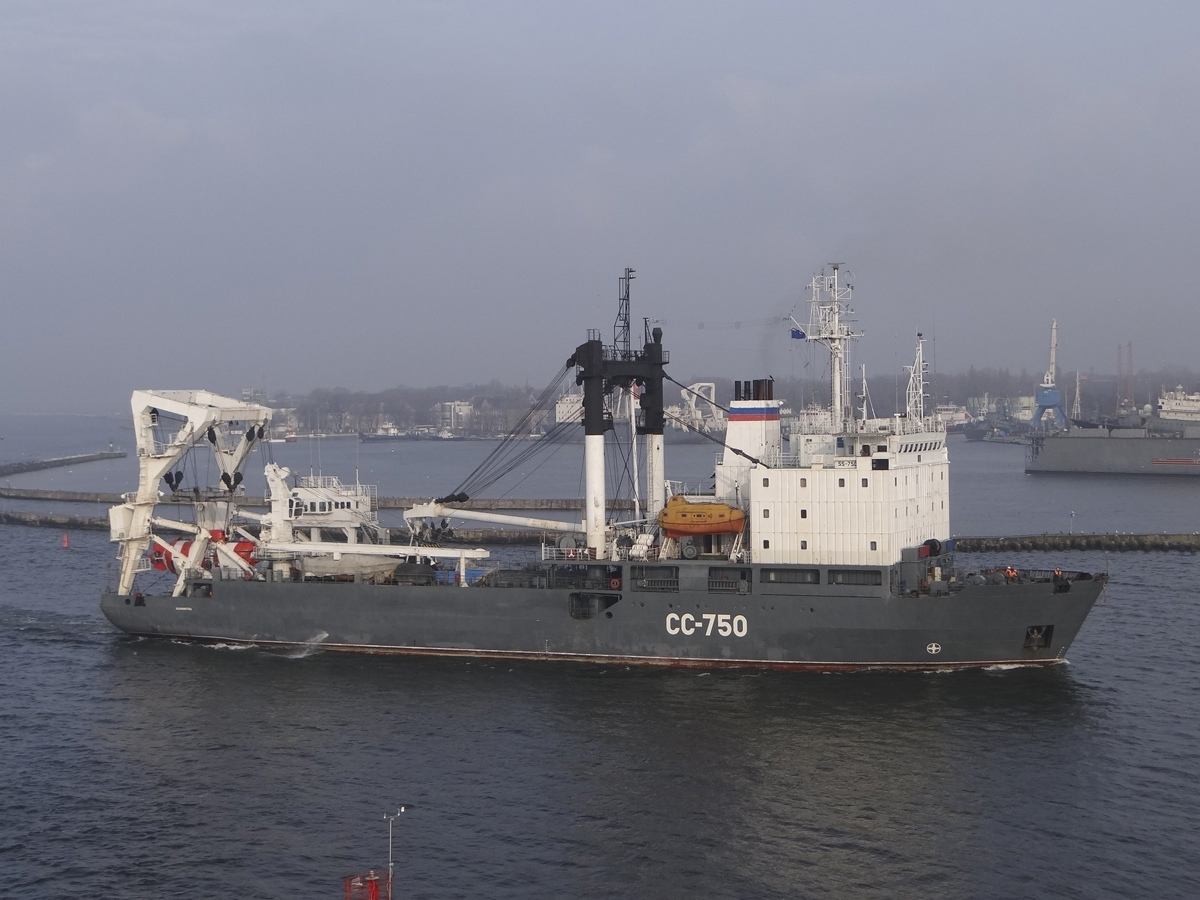
- SS-750 with its submersible in the Strait of Baltiysk

Class overview
- Name: Kashtan class
- Builders: Neptun Werft, Rostock, East Germany
- Operators: Soviet Navy (former); Russian Navy
- Completed: 8

General characteristics
- Type: Salvage vessel/ Submersible support
- Displacement: 4,200 tons standard; 6,200 tons full load
- Length: 97.83 m (321 ft 0 in)
- Beam: 18.20 m (59 ft 9 in)
- Draught: 5.70 m (18 ft 8 in)
- Propulsion: 2 × 1,500 hp (1,100 kW) diesel-electric motors, 2 fixed pitch propellers, 1 bow thruster, 5 × 775 kW diesel generators
- Speed: 13.5 knots (25.0 km/h; 15.5 mph)
- Range: 2,000 nautical miles (3,700 km; 2,300 mi) at 11 kn (20 km/h; 13 mph)
- Complement: 47

The Project 141, (NATO reporting name Kashtan class) is a class of salvage vessel/submersible support built at Rostock's Neptun Werft in East Germany for the Soviet Navy.

In total, eight ships of this type were commissioned from 1988 to 1990. The ships became part of the Russian Navy after the dissolution of the Soviet Union. The stern has a crane capable of lifting 100 tons with which a Priz-class deep-submergence rescue vehicle (DSRV) can be launched and recovered.

== Operations ==
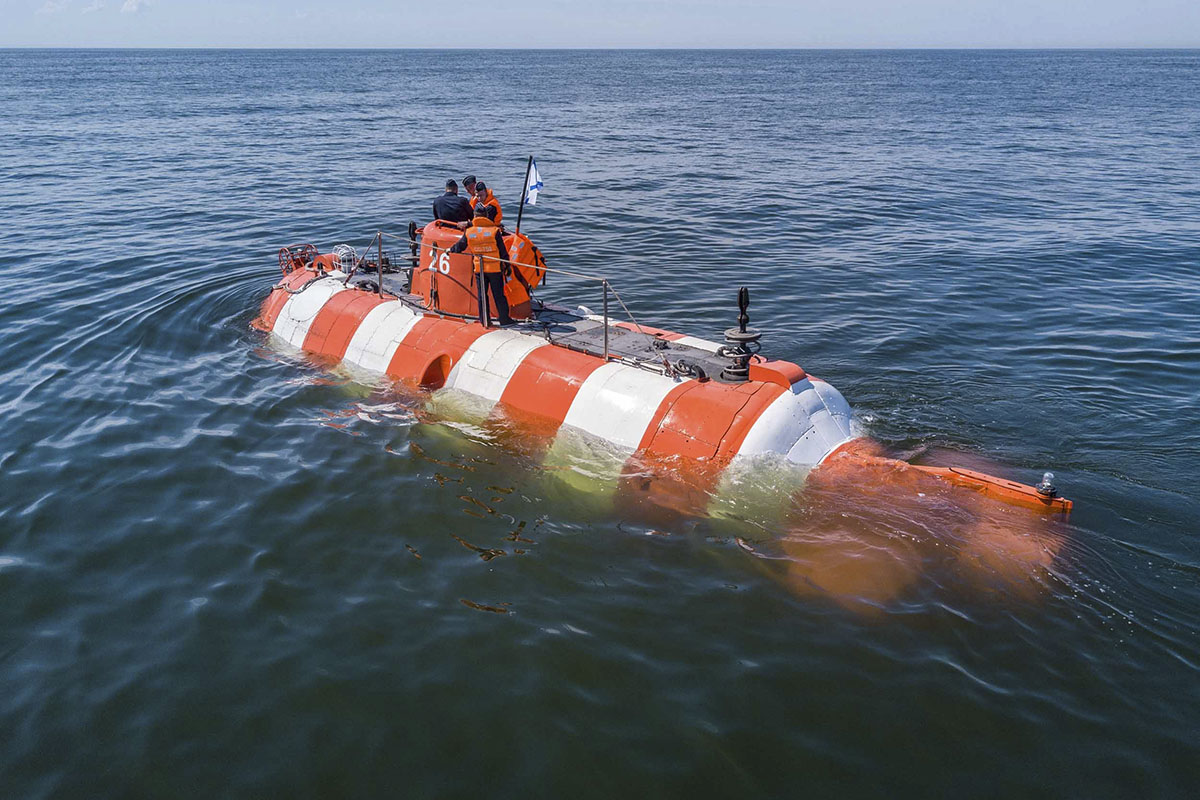
The submersible AS-26 that a Kashtan-class ship can launch

In June 2014 it was reported that SS-750 had participated in sea trials in the Baltic Sea of a Bester-1 submersible.

On 6 September 2022 Russia's Ministry of Defence informed that SS-750 had participated in sea trials in the Baltic Sea of two new, improved Kilo-class submarines and on 6 October there was again news of SS-750 having participated in sea trials in the Baltic Sea, this time with a single submarine.

In April 2023 the Danish Defence Command confirmed that on 22 September 2022 SS-750 and the Priz-class submersible AS-26 that it can launch were among six Russian Navy ships operating in the area where four days later the 2022 Nord Stream pipeline sabotage occurred.

== Ships ==
These are the eight Kashtan-class ships:

Name	Yard number	Launched	Commissioned	Fleet	New name	Status
KIL-926	141/1465	1986-11-29	1988-06-27	Baltic	Alexandr Pushkin (from 1999-05-27)	Active as of 2014
KIL-927	142/1468	1987-10-06	1988-11-23	Pacific		Active as of 2021
KIL-143	143/1469	1988-01-20	1989-02-28	Northern		Active as of 2006
KIL-158	144/1470	1988-04-29	1989-06-30	Black Sea (Baltic before 1989-11-08)		Active as of 2020
KIL-164	145/1471	1988-02-09	1989-10-20	Northern		Active as of 2016
KIL-498	146/1476	1988-12-20	1990-02-28	Pacific		Active as of 2019
KIL-140	147/1477	1989-06-16	1990-06-30	Baltic	SS-750 (from September 1995)	Active as of 2022
KIL-168	148/1478	1989-09-30	1990-10-05	Pacific (Black Sea before)		Active as of 2016

== Gallery ==
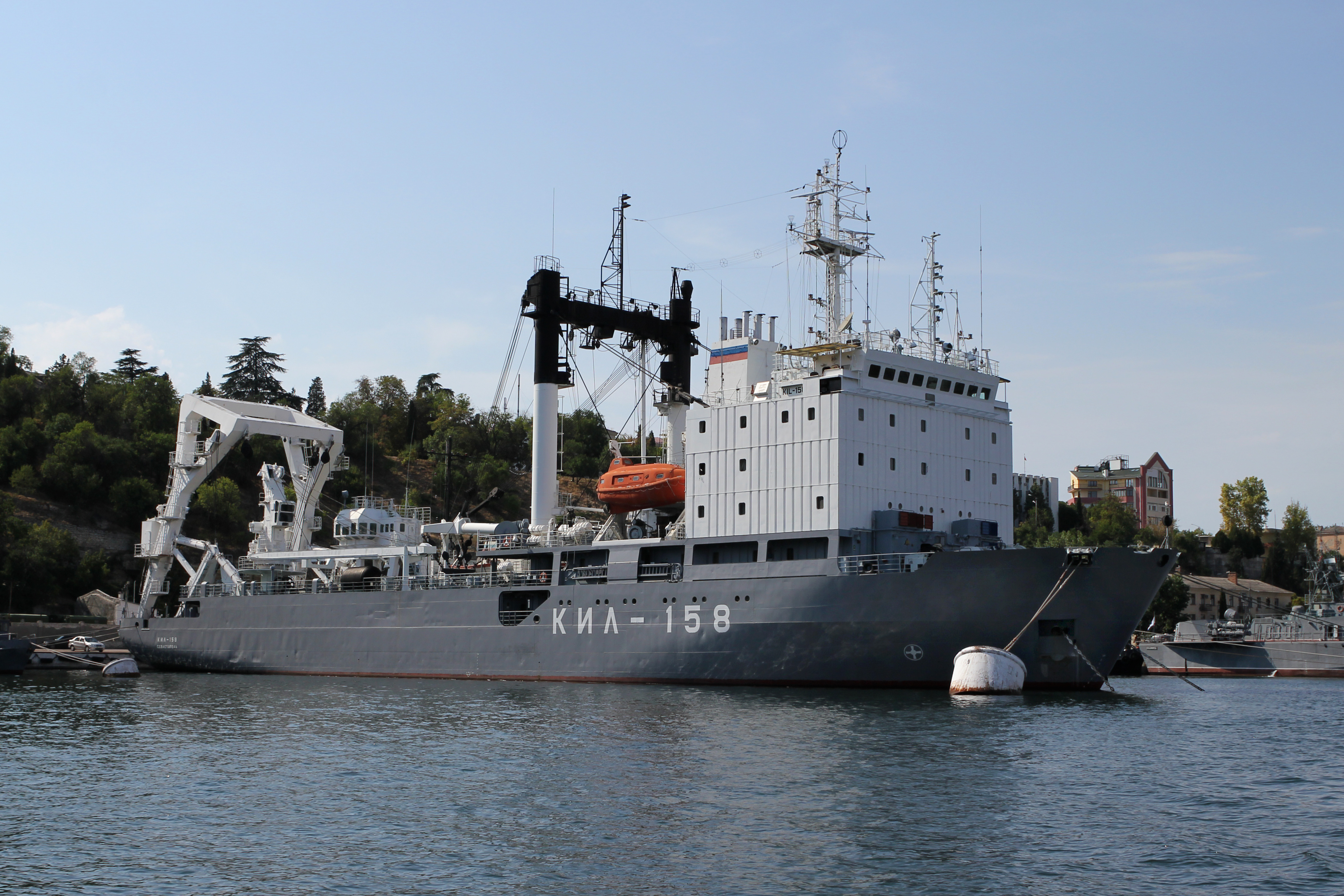
KIL-158 in 2012 in Yuzhnaya Bay, Sevastopol, the Black Sea

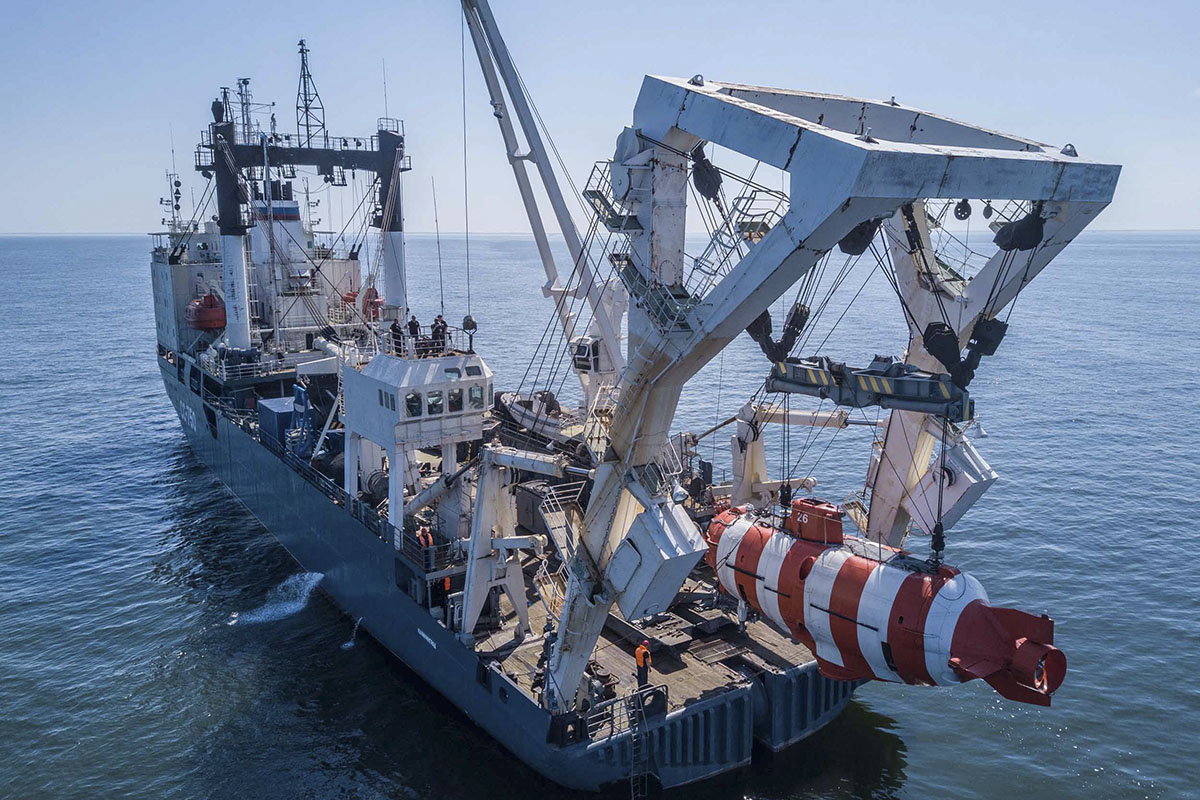
SS-750 launching the submersible AS-26

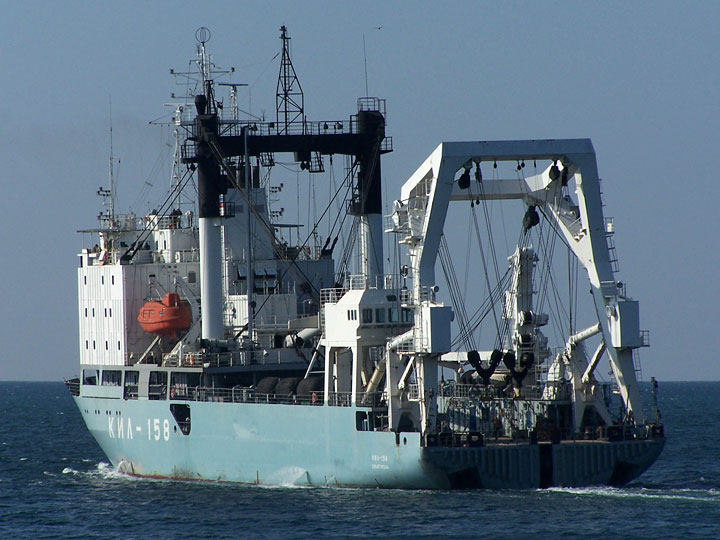
KIL-158 at sea

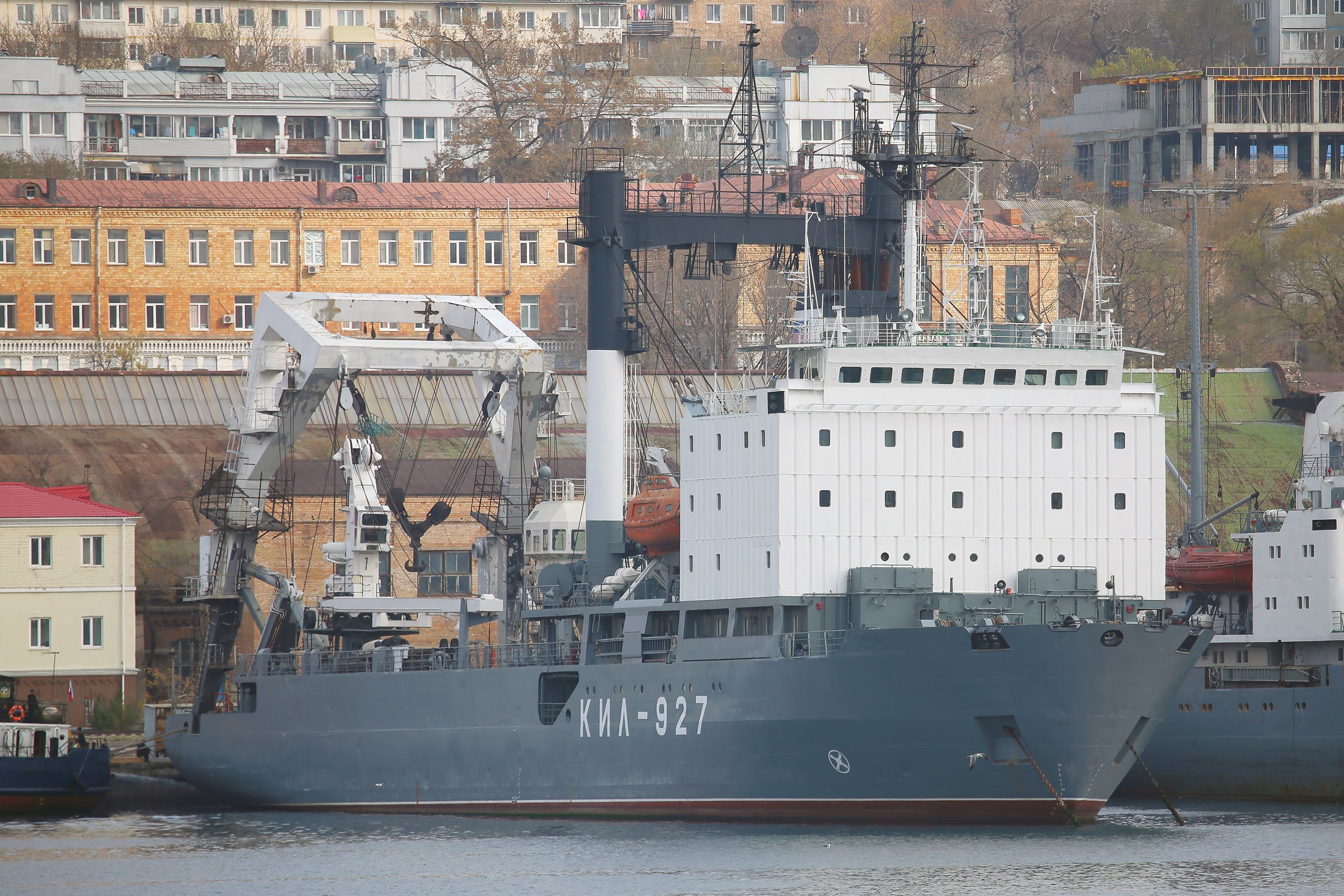
KIL-927 in Vladivostok

== See also ==
- List of ships of the Soviet Navy
- List of ships of Russia by project number
- List of active Russian Navy ships
