= Russian submarine AS-34 =

Priz-class deep-submergence rescue vehicle

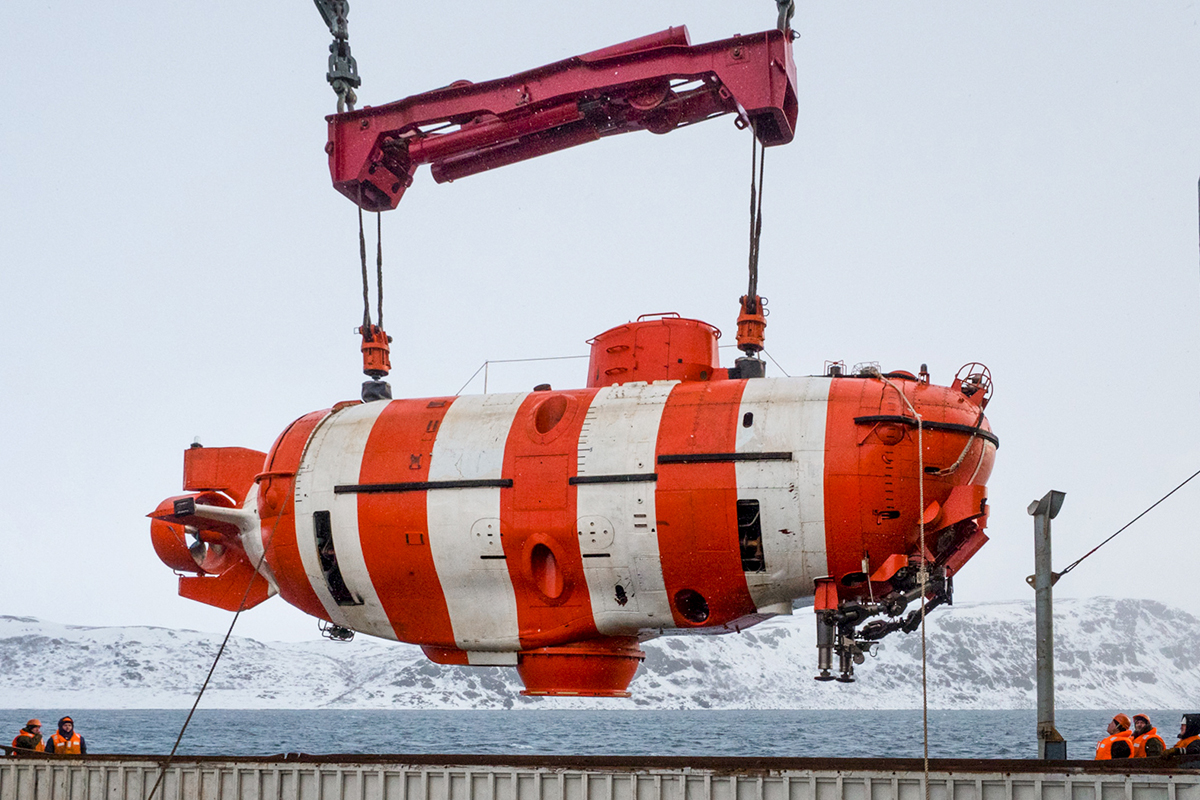
- AS-34 during sea trials in 2017

History

Russia
- Name: AS-34
- Laid down: January 1988
- Launched: 27 August 1989
- Commissioned: 30 November 1989
- Status: Active

General characteristics
- Class & type: Priz-class deep-submergence rescue vehicle
- Displacement: 55 t (54 long tons)
- Length: 13.5 m (44 ft 3 in)
- Beam: 3.8 m (12 ft 6 in)
- Height: 4.6 m (15 ft 1 in)
- Speed: 3.3 knots (6.1 km/h; 3.8 mph) maximum; 2.3 knots (4.3 km/h; 2.6 mph) cruise; 0.5 m/s (1.6 ft/s) ascent speed
- Range: 21 nmi (39 km; 24 mi)
- Endurance: 120 hours with 4 aboard; 10 hours with 24 aboard
- Test depth: 1,000 m (3,300 ft)
- Capacity: 20 passengers
- Crew: 5

AS-34 is a Russian Priz-class deep-submergence rescue vehicle, or rescue mini-submarine, which went into service in 1989.

== Service record ==
In 2000, AS-34 was stationed aboard the rescue ship Rudnetsky and participated in operations to attempt a rescue of personnel from the sunken submarine Kursk. The submarine managed to reach Kursk but was unable to establish a seal to fully dock on the ninth compartment and effect rescue.

== See also ==
- Kursk submarine disaster – 2000 submarine accident in the Barents Sea
