= Russian deep submergence rescue vehicle AS-28 =

Priz-class deep-submergence rescue vehicle of the Russian Navy

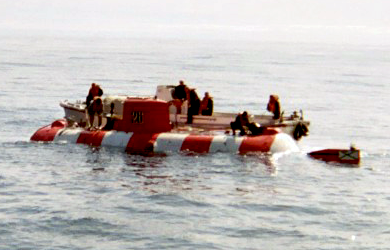
- AS-28 surfacing in the Bering Sea

History

Russia
- Name: AS-28
- Builder: Krasnoye Sormovo
- Yard number: 1
- Laid down: January 1982
- Launched: 10 December 1985
- Completed: 12 August 1986
- Commissioned: 12 August 1986
- Status: in active service

General characteristics
- Class & type: Priz-class deep-submergence rescue vehicle
- Displacement: 55 t (54 long tons)
- Length: 13.5 m (44 ft 3 in)
- Beam: 3.8 m (12 ft 6 in)
- Height: 4.6 m (15 ft 1 in)
- Speed: 3.3 knots (6.1 km/h) maximum; 2.3 knots (4.3 km/h) cruise; 0.5 metres per second (1.6 ft/s) ascent speed
- Range: 21 nmi (39 km)
- Endurance: 120 hours with 4 aboard; 10 hours with 24 aboard
- Test depth: 1,000 m (3,300 ft)
- Capacity: 20 passengers
- Crew: 5

AS-28 is a Priz-class deep-submergence rescue vehicle of the Russian Navy, commissioned in 1986.

On 5 August 2005, during a training operation off the Kamchatka Peninsula, AS-28 became entangled in equipment associated with a hydrophone array and sank to the seabed at a depth of 190 metres (620 ft), trapping its seven crew members. Russian attempts to free the vehicle were unsuccessful, prompting an international rescue effort involving the United Kingdom, the United States and Japan. On 7 August, a British Scorpio 45 remotely operated vehicle cut the cables that had trapped AS-28, allowing it to surface; all seven crew members were rescued unharmed.

== Training accident ==
On 5 August 2005 AS-28, under the command of Lieutenant Vyacheslav Milashevskiy, became entangled with the aerial of a hydrophone array off the coast of the Kamchatka Peninsula, in Berezovaya Bay, 70 kilometres (43 mi) southeast of Petropavlovsk-Kamchatskiy, Kamchatka Oblast. The aerial, anchored by 60-tonne concrete blocks, snared the propeller of the submarine, and the submarine then sank to the seafloor at a depth of 190 metres (620 ft). This was too deep for the ship's complement of seven to leave the submarine and swim to the surface. British rescuers and Russian officials stated that fishing nets also had entangled the vessel.

=== International appeal ===
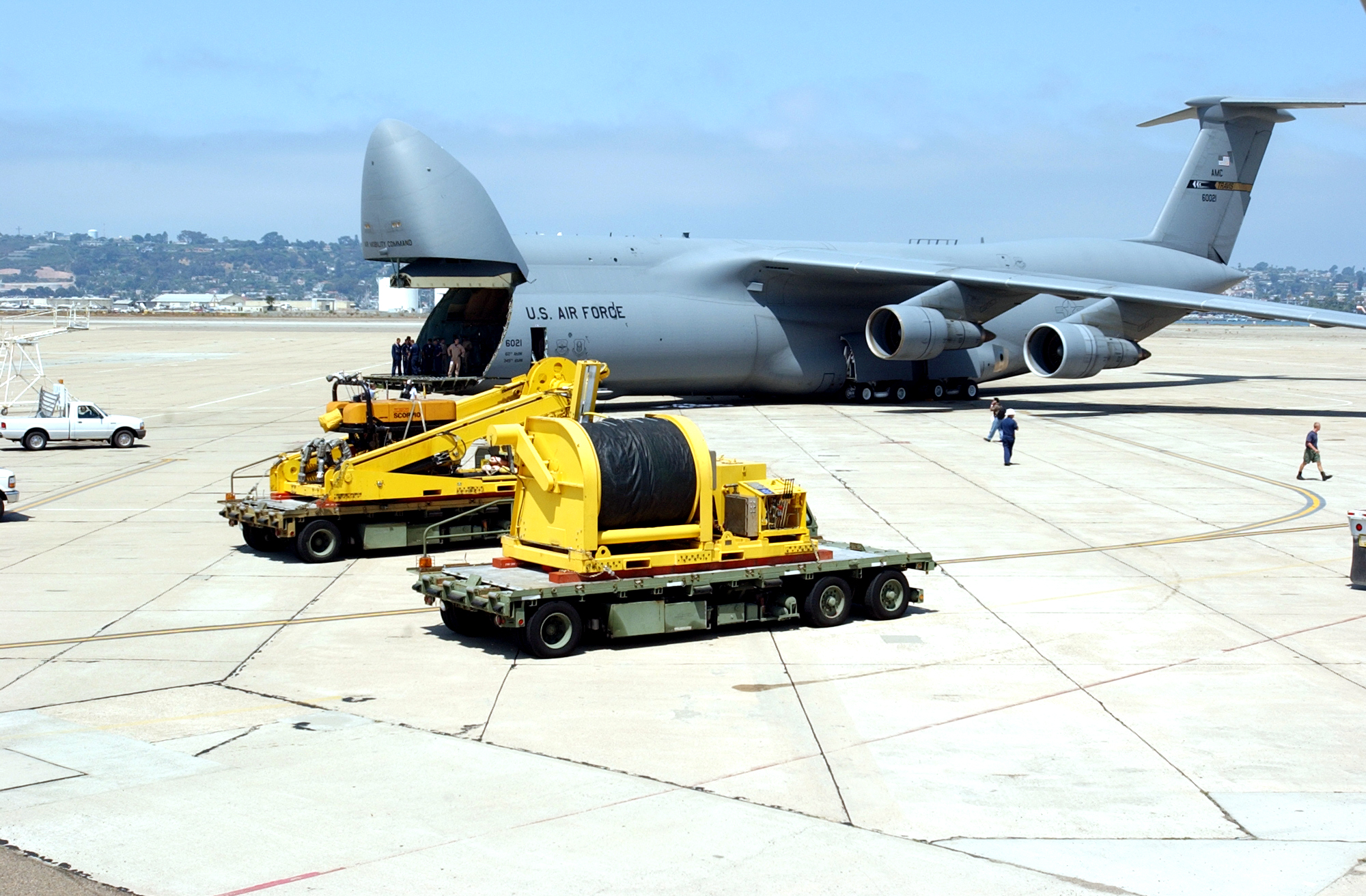
A C-5 Galaxy being loaded with people and equipment from the Deep Submergence Unit, Naval Air Station North Island, Coronado, California. The C-5 took one Super Scorpio robotic rescue vehicle to Russia to assist in the rescue.

Immediate support was offered by the Royal Navy, Japan Maritime Self-Defense Force and the United States Navy. The United Kingdom sent a Scorpio 45 remotely operated vehicle (ROV) via C-17 Globemaster III cargo aircraft and a team to operate it. The United States sent one unmanned Super Scorpio ROV from San Diego, airlifted via C-5 Galaxy transport. Each unmanned vehicle was also accompanied by a team to operate it. It was intended that these unmanned rescue vessels, with their robotic arms, would be able to cut the nets or cables that anchored the submarine. The American ROV was assembled on the support ship Priz although they were not required to get underway as the British Scorpio was able to execute the rescue. A tactical decision by the United States Pacific Fleet command team at Pearl Harbor, allowed the British crew to use the limited local resources toward one rescue asset. The British team's efforts resulted in a successful rescue.

=== Rescue ===
On 6 August, Russian President Vladimir Putin ordered Russian Minister of Defence Sergei Ivanov to fly to Petropavlovsk-Kamchatsky to oversee the rescue operation, which was under the command of the Commander of the Russian Pacific Fleet, Admiral Viktor Fyodorov.

Russian Admiral Fyodorov first discussed using explosives to cut the antenna but those tactics were never employed. The Russian oceangoing tugs MB-105 and KIL-168 instead attempted to lift the stricken craft to the surface using underslung cables. This attempt proved futile. Meanwhile, to conserve energy and oxygen, the crew of AS-28 shut down the submarine's non-essential systems (including the heater), donned thermal suits, and rested.

The British Scorpio was the only foreign ROV to arrive and be deployed. It successfully cut away the cables which had snagged the submarine while surface ships had retreated a safe distance.

On 7 August, all seven sailors were rescued after the cables snaring their submarine were cut by a British ROV. The submarine surfaced at 4:26 p.m. local time and all seven crewmen exited the vessel without assistance with four to six hours of air remaining.

=== Repercussions ===
The Guardian reports questions have been raised over how long Russian officials waited to request help. The first exposure of the accident came when the wife of a crewman called a radio station 24 hours later, and the wife of commander Milashevsky claims they were actually stranded Wednesday. Kommersant reported that the head of the Navy Vladimir Kuroyedov, may be relieved over this, the Kursk, and other incidents. Another nuclear submarine, the K-159, being towed to the junkyard, sank in 2003 when the pontoon broke loose, with the loss of nine lives. The BBC also reported that in July, an inter-continental ballistic missile test firing witnessed by Putin failed to launch twice; then exploded soon after launch the next day. Although officials claimed the crew of AS-28 had food and water for five days, they were actually desperately short of water.

The story of the submarine's rescue was featured on the BBC One documentary Submarine Rescue. The documentary was subsequently awarded the accolade of "best documentary" by the British Maritime Society. The rescue of AS-28 by Scorpio was also featured as the subject of the tenth episode of the 2007–2008 documentary series Critical Situation, entitled "Running Out of Air".

== See also ==
- Russian submarine Kursk – Oscar-II class cruise missile submarine
- Russian submarine K-159
- Deep-submergence vehicle – Self-propelled deep-diving crewed submersible
- Deep Drone – US Navy remotely operated underwater vehicle
- List of submarine incidents since 2000
