= Priz-class deep-submergence rescue vehicle =

Russian submersibles

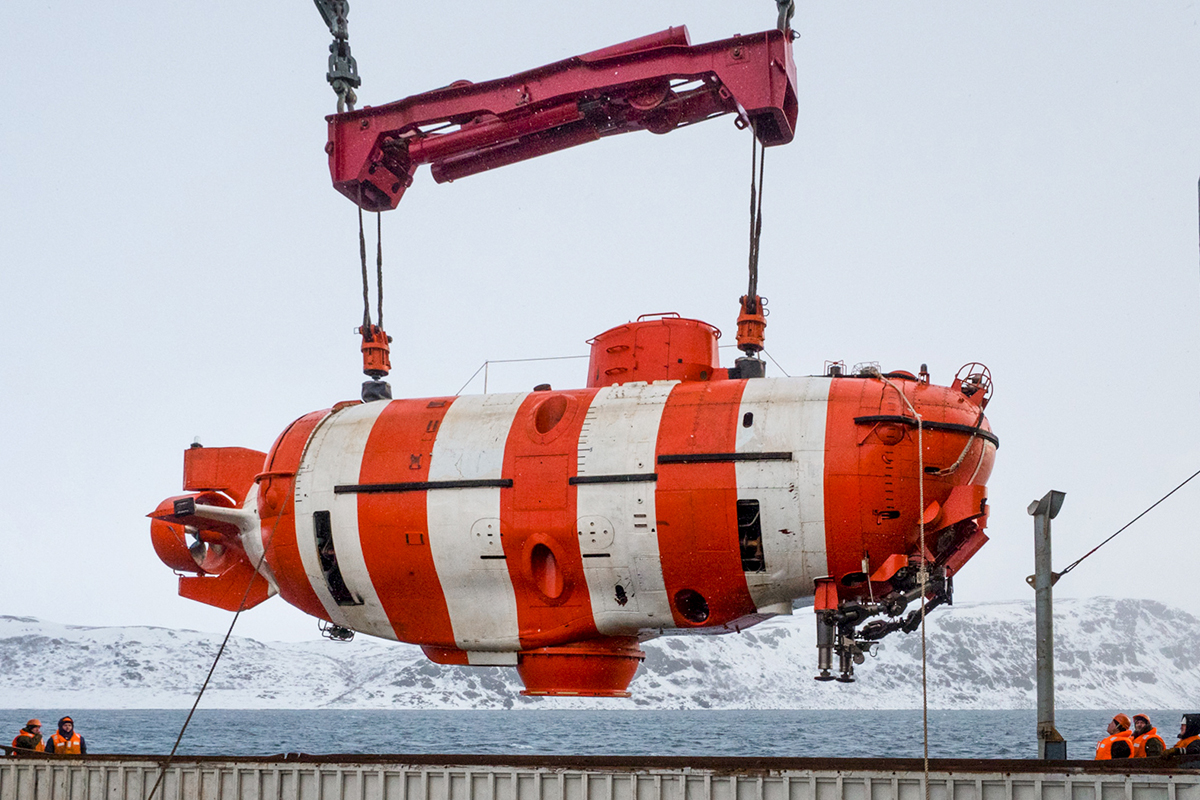
- AS-34 during sea trials in 2017

Class overview
- Name: Priz class
- Builders: Krasnoe Sormovo
- Operators: Russian Navy
- Built: 1982–1989
- In service: 1986–present
- Completed: 5
- Active: 4

General characteristics
- Type: Deep submergence rescue vehicle
- Displacement: 55 t (54 long tons)
- Length: 13.5 m (44 ft 3 in)
- Beam: 3.8 m (12 ft 6 in)
- Height: 4.6 m (15 ft 1 in)
- Speed: 3.3 knots (6.1 km/h; 3.8 mph) maximum; 2.3 knots (4.3 km/h; 2.6 mph) cruise; 0.5 metres per second (1.6 ft/s) ascent speed
- Range: 21 nmi (39 km)
- Endurance: 120 hours with 4 aboard; 10 hours with 24 aboard
- Test depth: 1,000 m (3,300 ft)
- Capacity: 20 passengers
- Crew: 4

The Priz class (Project 1855) is a type of deep-submergence rescue vehicle (DSRV) operated by the government of Russia. There are known to be at least five vessels of the class, several of which were involved in the failed rescue attempt when the submarine Kursk sank on 12 August 2000. The Russian word "Priz" (“приз”) means "prize".

== Specifications ==
The titanium-hulled vessels are 13.5 metres (44 ft 3 in) long, 3.8 m (12 ft 6 in) wide and 4.6 m (15 ft 1 in) high, with a displacement of 55 tonnes (54 long tons). Capable of operating at depths up to 1,000 m (3,300 ft), they have a range of 21 nautical miles (39 km; 24 mi), at a top speed of 3.3 knots (6.1 km/h; 3.8 mph). With a crew of four, they can stay submerged for up to 120 hours, but with the crew and a full complement of 20 passengers aboard this is reduced to 10 hours. The Priz vessels are equipped with manipulators that can lift up to 50 kilograms (110 lb).

According to a report on Russian television (Vesti, on Rossiya channel, 7 August 2005), the Project 1855 Priz vessel was designed by the Lazurit Design Bureau of Nizhny Novgorod, and four modifications were made: AS-26 (1986), AS-28 (1989), AS-30 (1989), and AS-34 (1991).

== Operations ==
The Priz class is thought to be operable either crewed or uncrewed with a battery endurance of three hours. Between 2006 and 2016, an upgrade of the class to improve its navigational, search and life-support ability was conducted.

The Priz submarines are carried by Pionier Moskvyy-class submersible support ships (Project 05360/05361), which can carry up to two of the submarines. The ships are equipped with special equipment to deploy a Priz in rough seas.

== List of boats ==
There are currently four Priz vessels operating.

- AS-26
- AS-28
- AS-30
- AS-34

== See also ==
- List of ships of Russia by project number
- Russian submarine Kursk (K-141) – Oscar-II class cruise missile submarine
- List of submarine incidents since 2000
- Kashtan-class salvage vessel - able to launch a Priz-class DSRV
