= Scorpio ROV =

Work class remotely operated underwater vehicle

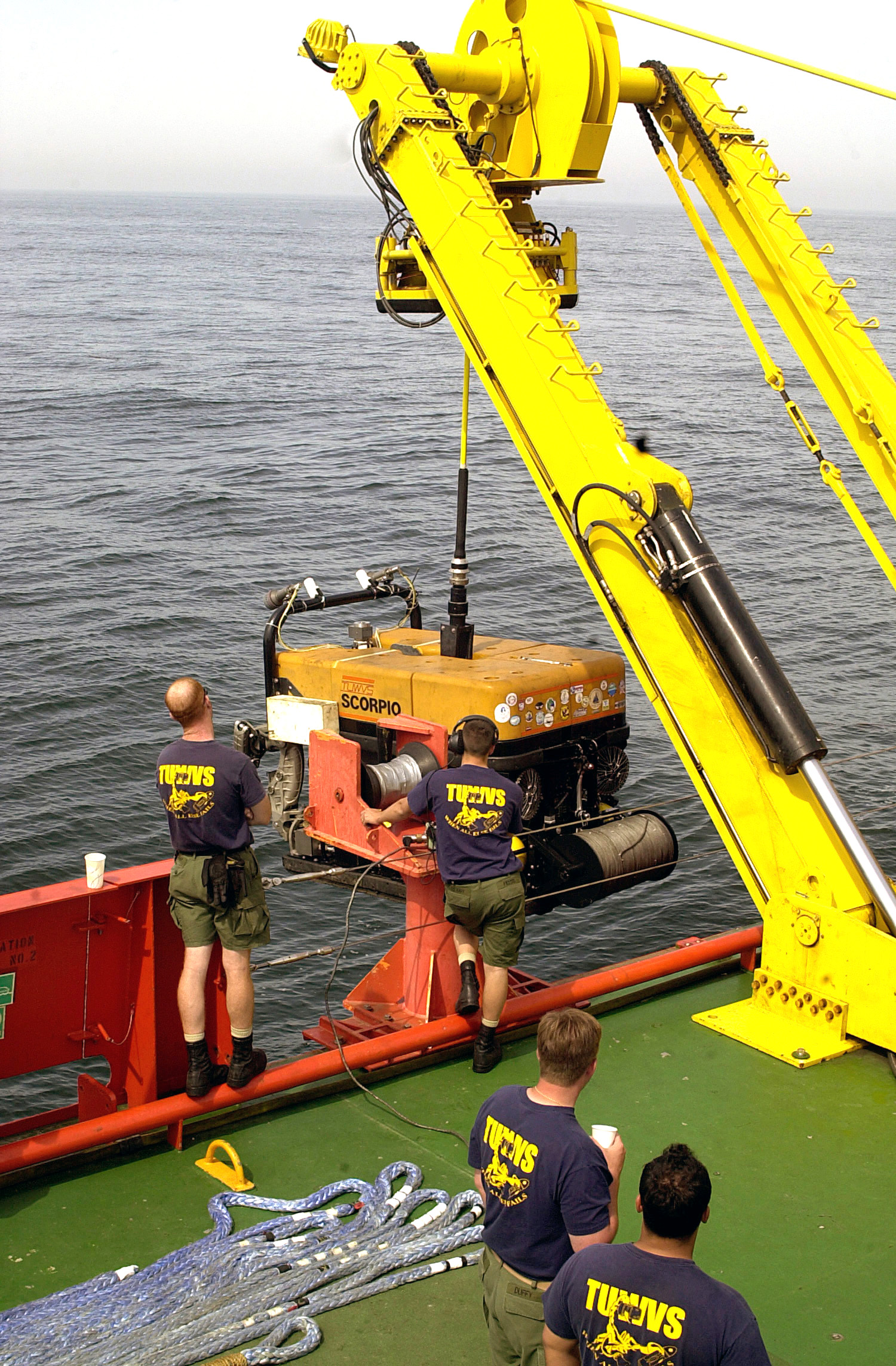
U.S. Navy Super Scorpio ROV

The Scorpio (Submersible Craft for Ocean Repair, Position, Inspection and Observation) is a brand of underwater submersible Remotely Operated Vehicle (ROV) manufactured by Perry Tritech used by sub-sea industries such as the oil industry for general operations, and by the Royal Navy and the United States Navy for submarine rescue services. Originally developed by AMETEK Straza of El Cajon, California, they were subsequently developed by Perry Tritech. Although the design of the original Scorpio is over several decades old, it forms the basis for a current generation of Scorpio-branded ROVs. Scorpio ROVs are named in a sequence following the order of manufacture, such as "Scorpio 17" or "Scorpio 45" which refer to specific ROVs.

== Scorpio 45 ==
The UK operates a Scorpio 45, based at the Australian Submarine Rescue Service headquarters in Perth, Western Australia. It carries three remote cameras, two manipulator arms (including cutting equipment), one Sonar device and six 250 Watt lights. It is operated by James Fisher Defense who provide the underwater rescue service to the RAN. The vehicle is deployed along with a control room, built into a standard shipping container.

=== Specifications ===
- Length: 2.75 metres
- Height: 1.8 meters
- Width: 1.8 meters
- Weight: 1,650 kg
- Payload: up to 30 kg (without additional buoyancy)
- Maximum depth: 1,000 m (in sea water)
- Maximum speed: 4 knots (7 km/h) forward, 3.25 knots astern, 2.5 knots (4.6 km/h) laterally

== Super Scorpio ==
Delivered to the U.S. Navy in 1987, the Super Scorpio is a "Tethered Unmanned Work Vehicle System". The vehicles are used for the recovery of sunken military and commercial hardware. They feature two cameras, a sonar, six lights and two robotic arms. The arms can cut steel cable up to one inch (2.5 cm) thick and lift up to 250 pounds (113 kg) each. The sonar has a range of 2,000 feet (610 m).

=== Specifications ===
- Length: 2.43 meters
- Height: 1.22 meters
- Width: 1.22 meters
- Weight: 2,040 kg
- Maximum depth: 1,520 meters
- Maximum speed: 4 knots (7 km/h) forward/astern, 2 knots (4 km/h) laterally

== Projects ==
=== Kursk rescue attempt ===
Scorpio vehicles were sent to assist in the rescue of the Kursk, a Russian Oscar II class submarine which sank on 12 August 2000. Unfortunately, they were unable to save any of the 118 crew.

=== SEALAB habitat ===
In 2002, High Performance Wireless Research and Education Network researchers conducted an expedition to locate the SEALAB II/III habitat located off Scripps Pier in La Jolla, California. Researchers utilized a Scorpio ROV from the MV Kellie Chouest to find the site and were able to conduct a live multicast from ship to shore. This expedition was the first return to the site since the habitat was moved.

=== Priz (AS-28) submersible rescue ===
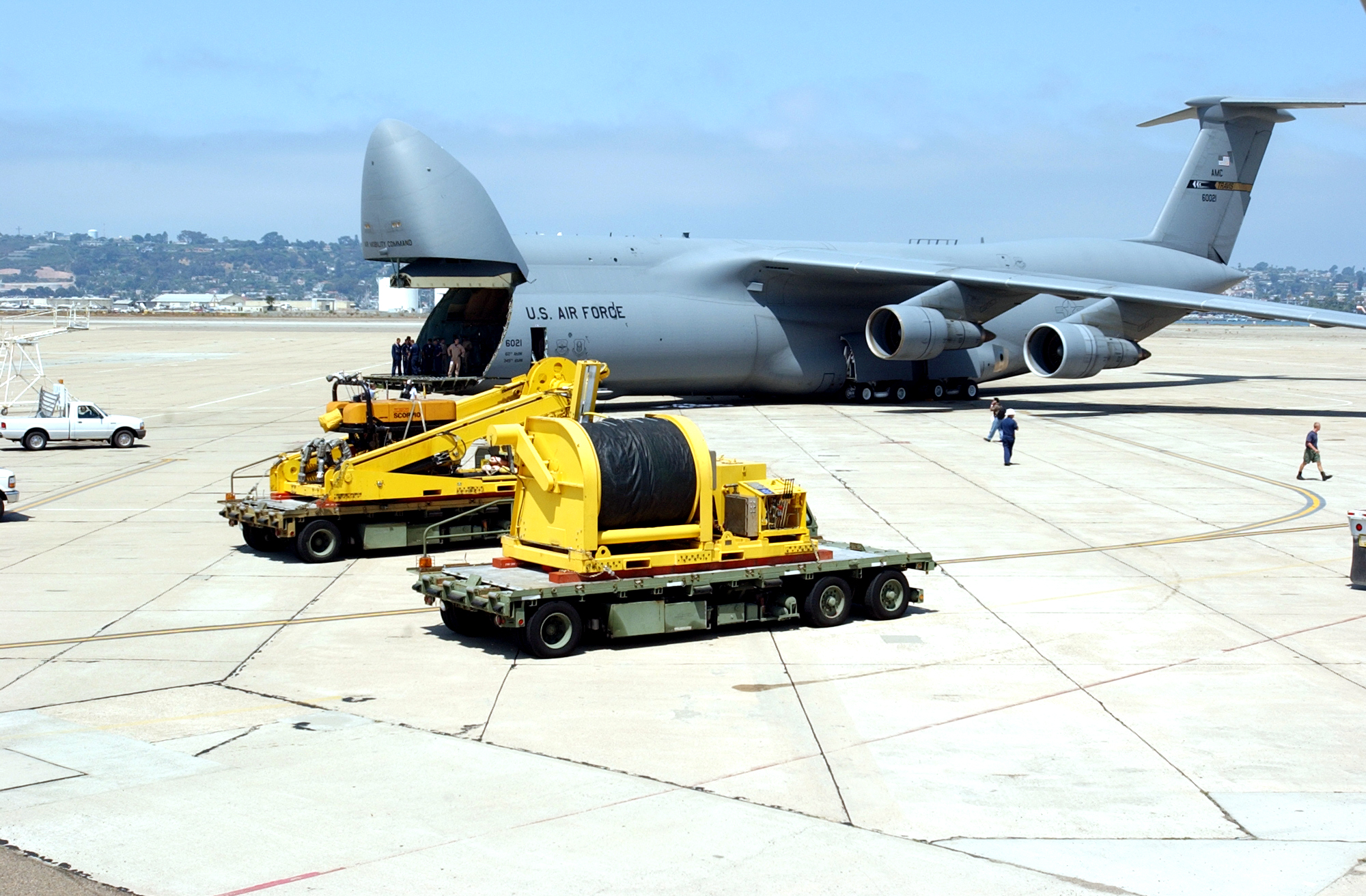
A C-5 Galaxy is loaded with people and equipment from the Deep Submergence Unit, Naval Base Coronado. The C-5 is bringing two Super Scorpio robotic rescue vehicles to Russia to assist in the rescue.

Both the UK and U.S. sent Scorpio vehicles to the location of a Russian Priz class submersible AS-28 trapped on the sea floor off the Kamchatka Peninsula on 5 August 2005.

The UK vehicle flew on a C-17 to the incident with a team of 28 including police officers, civilian operators and one member of the Royal Navy, Commander Ian Riches. Two U.S. vehicles and 40 support personnel were sent from Naval Air Station North Island, near San Diego, via a C-5 Galaxy transport to Kamchatka. Both the UK and U.S. equipment and teams were transported by Russian surface ships to the accident scene. The British Scorpio managed to free the trapped AS-28 on August 7, 2005, allowing the Russian submersible to surface and saving all seven crew members on board. The American ROVs arrived two hours after the British crew and assisted them.

== See also ==
- LR5 – Crewed submersible for submarine rescue submersible
- Remotely operated underwater vehicle – A tethered underwater mobile device operated by a remote crew
- Autonomous underwater vehicle – Uncrewed underwater vehicle with autonomous guidance system
