= Deep Submergence insignia =

US Navy uniform badge

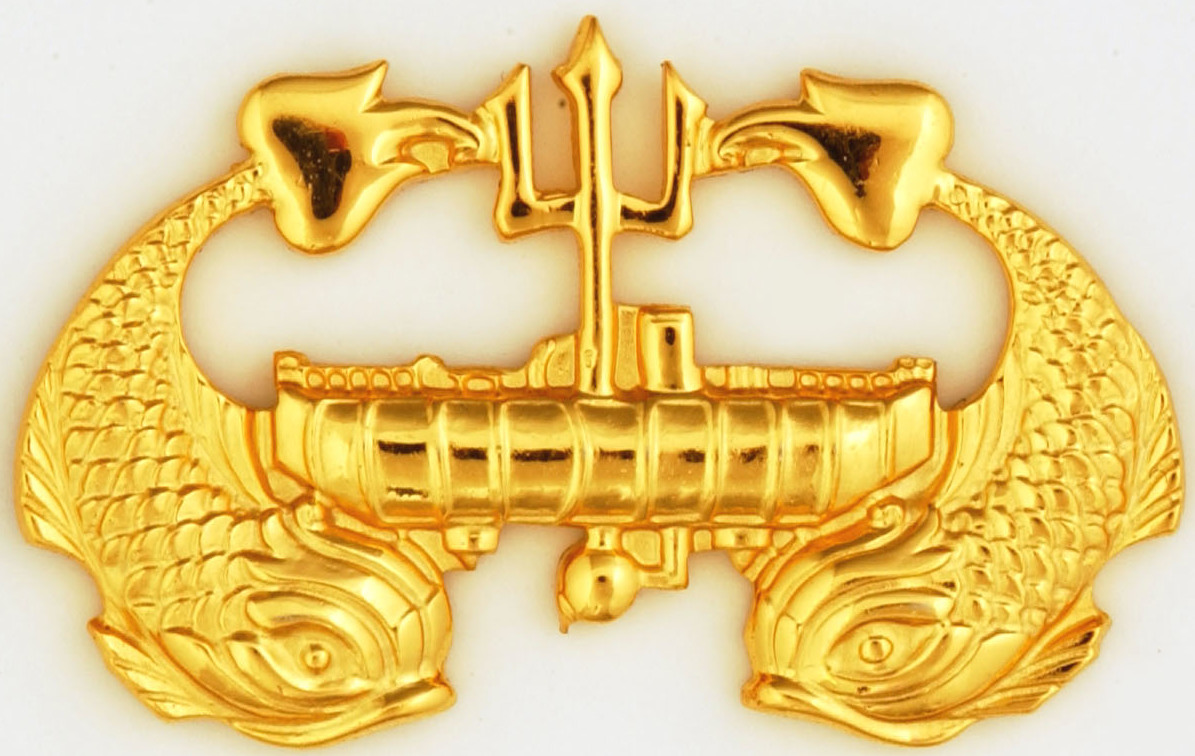
Deep Submergence Officer badge

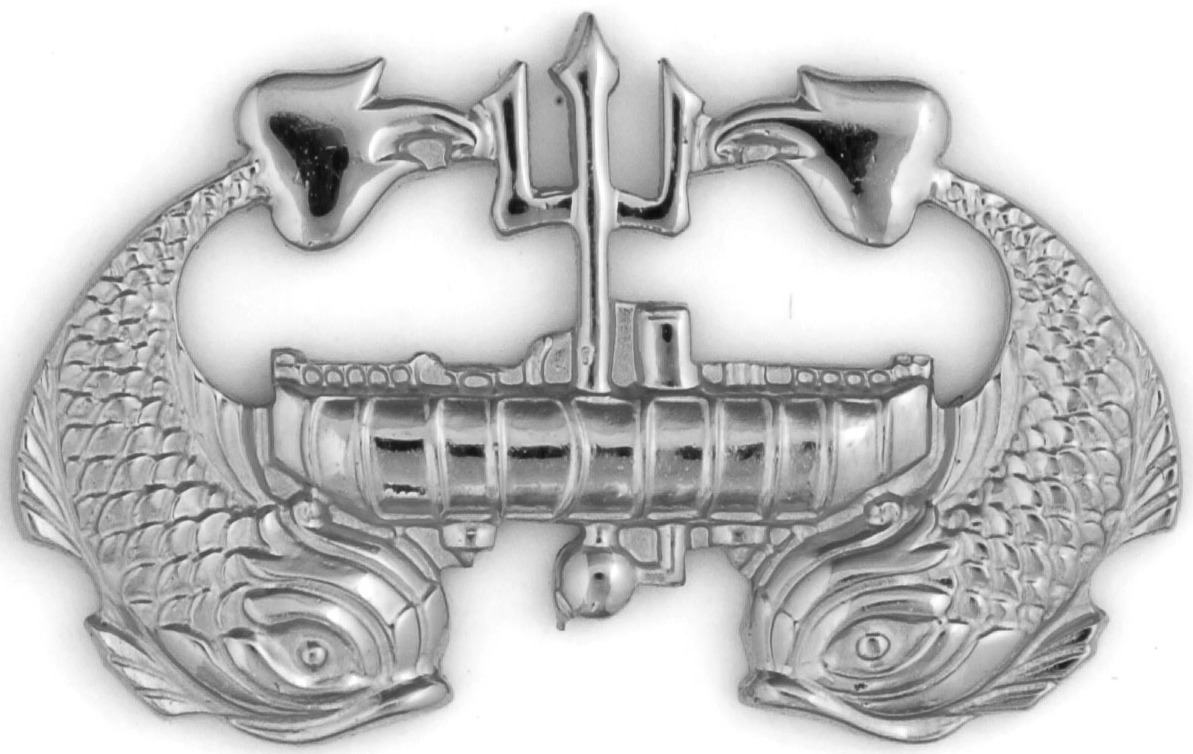
Deep Submergence Enlisted badge

The Deep Submergence Insignia is a uniform breast pin worn by officers, both men and women (1993 to 1997 before the Department of the Navy changed the policy) of the United States Navy's submarine service who are qualified in submarines and have completed one year of regular assignment to a crewed or uncrewed deep submersible. The badge was first approved on 6 April 1981.

Examples of eligible Deep Submersible Vessels include:

- Trieste
- Trieste II (DSV-1)
- Alvin (DSV-2)
- Turtle (DSV-3)
- Sea Cliff (DSV-4)
- USS Dolphin (AGSS-555)
- NR-1 Deep Submergence Craft
- Deep Submergence Unit, Unmanned Vehicles Detachment (UMV)
- Deep Submergence Rescue Vehicle Mystic (DSRV-1)
- DSRV Avalon (DSRV-2)
- Undersea Rescue Command
- Submarine Rescue Chamber
- Pressurized Rescue Module

The insignia is also authorized to a supporting deep submergence detachment.

The Deep Submergence Insignia is issued in two grades, gold for officers and silver for enlisted personnel (enlisted personnel may wear the gold pin if they have qualified officer watches). The pin shows the broadside of a Trieste in front of a vertical trident, flanked by heraldic dolphins. The badge is considered a "secondary insignia" and is normally worn on the left uniform pocket, beneath award ribbons and any primary warfare badges, such as the Submarine Warfare Insignia. Personnel eligible to wear other secondary insignias, such as the Submarine Combat Patrol Insignia or SSBN Deterrent Patrol Insignia, may only wear one insignia at a time according to their personal desire.

== See also ==
- List of United States Navy enlisted warfare designations
- Badges of the United States Navy
- Military badges of the United States
- Obsolete badges of the United States military
- Uniforms of the United States Navy
