= URF (Swedish Navy) =

Swedish submarine rescue vehicle

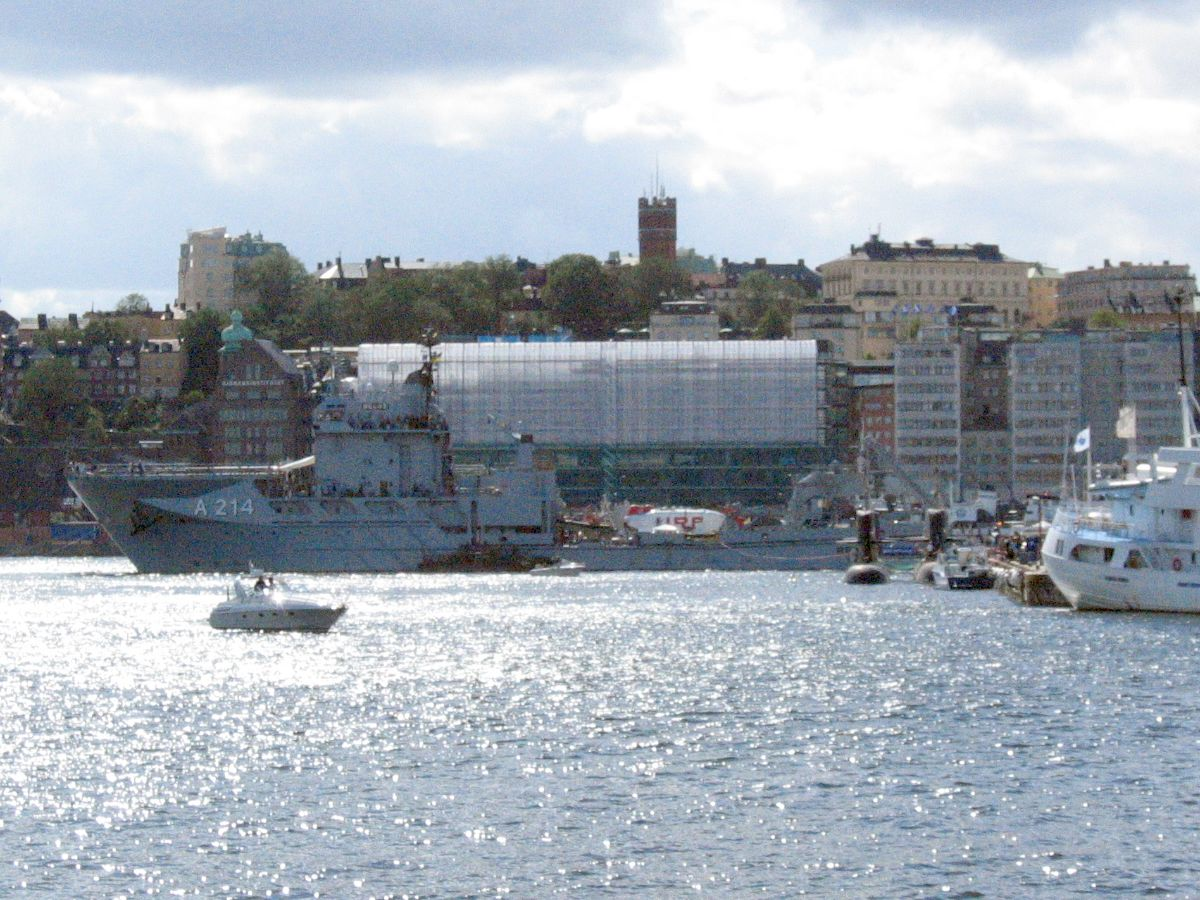
- URF loaded onto HMS Belos

History

Sweden
- Name: URF
- Ordered: 1972
- Builder: Shipyard Kockums, Sweden
- Launched: 1978
- Commissioned: August 1978

General characteristics
- Displacement: 54 tonnes
- Length: 13.9m
- Beam: 3.2m
- Complement: 2 Pilots; 1 Engineer; 1 Rescue room Operator
- Notes: Maximum operating depth: 450m msw; Maximum angle for mating to a submarine: 45 degrees in all directions

URF (Ubåtsräddningsfarkost – Submarine Rescue Vessel) is the Royal Swedish Navy's Submarine Rescue Vessel.

== History ==
The original design of the URF had a rescue capacity of 25 submariners and included a diver lockout chamber to provide means for hatch-clearance and assistance. The first of three planned URFs was constructed in 1978, by the Kockums company of Sweden. In 1981, it was first connected successfully to a submerged submarine.

The diver lockout system was removed in 1984 in favour of longer endurance and the capacity to rescue a full Swedish submarine crew of 35 in one lift. The original propulsion system with thrusters at the sides was also removed in favour of a more conventional propeller in the stern, providing more power and a reduced risk of damaging the thrusters during operation. The original trailer was replaced with one which has more axles. This, together with some minor changes of the fin, allowed transportability by air since 2000.

In 2015, the original URF was further upgraded by marine builders JFDefence.

== 2015 operation ==
The URF can operate to the Baltic Sea's maximum depth. It has a rescue skirt which makes it possible to mate with the submarine's emergency hatch, and can rescue a submarine crew of up to 35 submariners in a single trip, while holding them in above-atmospheric pressure if necessary until they can be transferred under pressure to a decompression chamber system to continue treatment and decompression.

The URF is a free-swimming vehicle with a pressure hull which is separated into three pressure-tight compartments. Two pilots manoeuvre the vehicle from the pilot compartment by operating one main propulsion unit and four tunnel thrusters. The third crew member is the machinery operator who also assists the pilots while docking the URF with the disabled submarine. If the submarine is pressurised, an additional rescue room operator is included in the crew.

The pressure hull is surrounded by a streamlined fibreglass reinforced plastic casing which protects auxiliary equipment mounted between the pressure hull and casing, which includes batteries, compressed air and oxygen cylinders, hydraulics and trim systems.

In cases where its mothership, Belos, can't get the URF to the rescue site quickly, the URF is flown to a suitable airport, transported to a port on its trailer, and towed to the area of operations.

== See also ==
- International Submarine Escape and Rescue Liaison Office (ISMERLO) – Organization coordinating submarine search-and-rescue operations
- NATO Submarine Rescue System – Project to develop an international submarine rescue system
- Submarine Rescue Diving Recompression System (SRDRS) – Remotely operated vehicle for rescue of personnel from sunken submarines
- LR5 Submarine Rescue System – Crewed submersible for submarine rescue
- Russian deep submergence rescue vehicle AS-28 – Priz-class deep-submergence rescue vehicle of the Russian Navy
- McCann Rescue Chamber – Diving bell for rescuing submariners
- Deep-submergence rescue vehicle – Submersible used for rescue of people from disabled submarines and submersibles
- Australian Submarine Rescue Vehicle Remora – Diving bell operated by the Australian Navy
- Submarine Escape Immersion Equipment – Whole-body exposure suit that allows submariners to escape from a sunken submarine
