= USS Billfish (SSN-676) =

American naval submarine

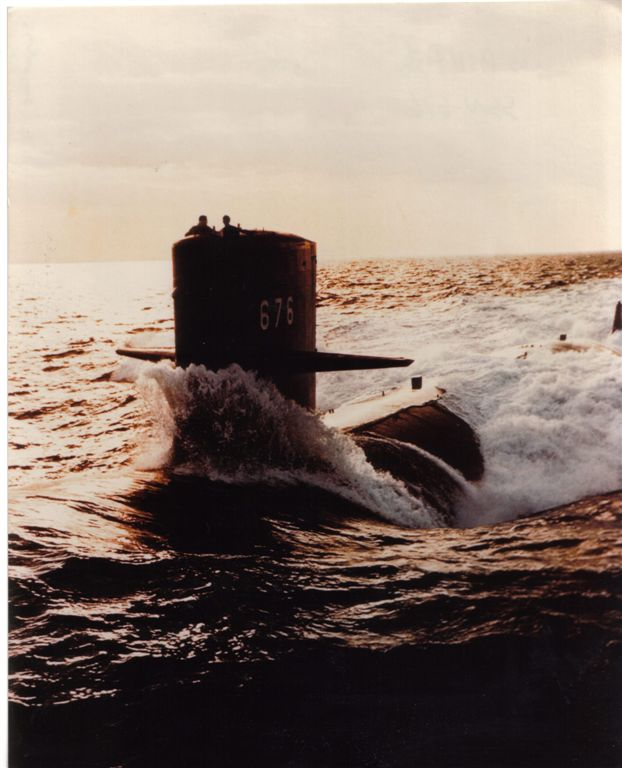
- USS Billfish (SSN-676) early in 1971 (picture taken during first sea trial).

History

United States
- Name: USS Billfish (SSN-676)
- Namesake: The billfish, a name used for any fish with bill-shaped jaws
- Ordered: 15 July 1966
- Builder: The Electric Boat Division of General Dynamics Corporation, Groton, Connecticut
- Laid down: 20 September 1968
- Launched: 1 May 1970
- Commissioned: 12 March 1971
- Decommissioned: 1 July 1999
- Stricken: 1 July 1999
- Motto: Spirit of 76
- Fate: Scrapping via Ship and Submarine Recycling Program completed 26 April 2000
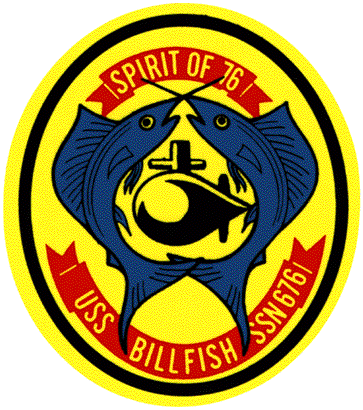
- Badge

General characteristics
- Class & type: Sturgeon-class attack submarine
- Displacement: 3,978 long tons (4,042 t) light; 4,270 long tons (4,339 t) full; 292 long tons (297 t) dead
- Length: 292 ft 3 in (89.08 m)
- Beam: 31 ft 8 in (9.65 m)
- Draft: 28 ft 8 in (8.74 m)
- Installed power: 15,000 shaft horsepower (11.2 megawatts)
- Propulsion: One S5W nuclear reactor, two steam turbines, one screw
- Speed: 15 knots (28 km/h; 17 mph) surfaced; 25 knots (46 km/h; 29 mph) submerged
- Test depth: 1,300 feet (396 meters)
- Complement: 109 (14 officers, 95 enlisted men)
- Armament: 4 × 21-inch (533 mm) torpedo tubes

USS Billfish (SSN-676), a Sturgeon-class attack submarine, was the second ship of the United States Navy to be named for the billfish, a name used for any fish, such as gar or spearfish, with bill-shaped jaws.

== Construction and commissioning ==
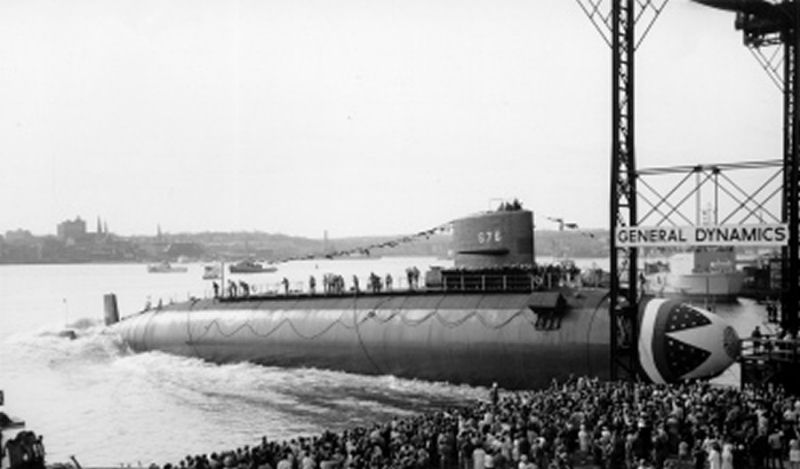
Billfish being launched at Groton, Connecticut, on 1 May 1970.

The contract to build Billfish was awarded to the Electric Boat Division of General Dynamics Corporation in Groton, Connecticut, on 15 July 1966 and her keel was laid down on 20 September 1968. She was launched on 1 May 1970, sponsored by Mrs. Earle G. Wheeler, the wife of Chairman of the Joint Chiefs of Staff General Earle G. Wheeler (1908–1975), and commissioned on 12 March 1971.

== Service history ==
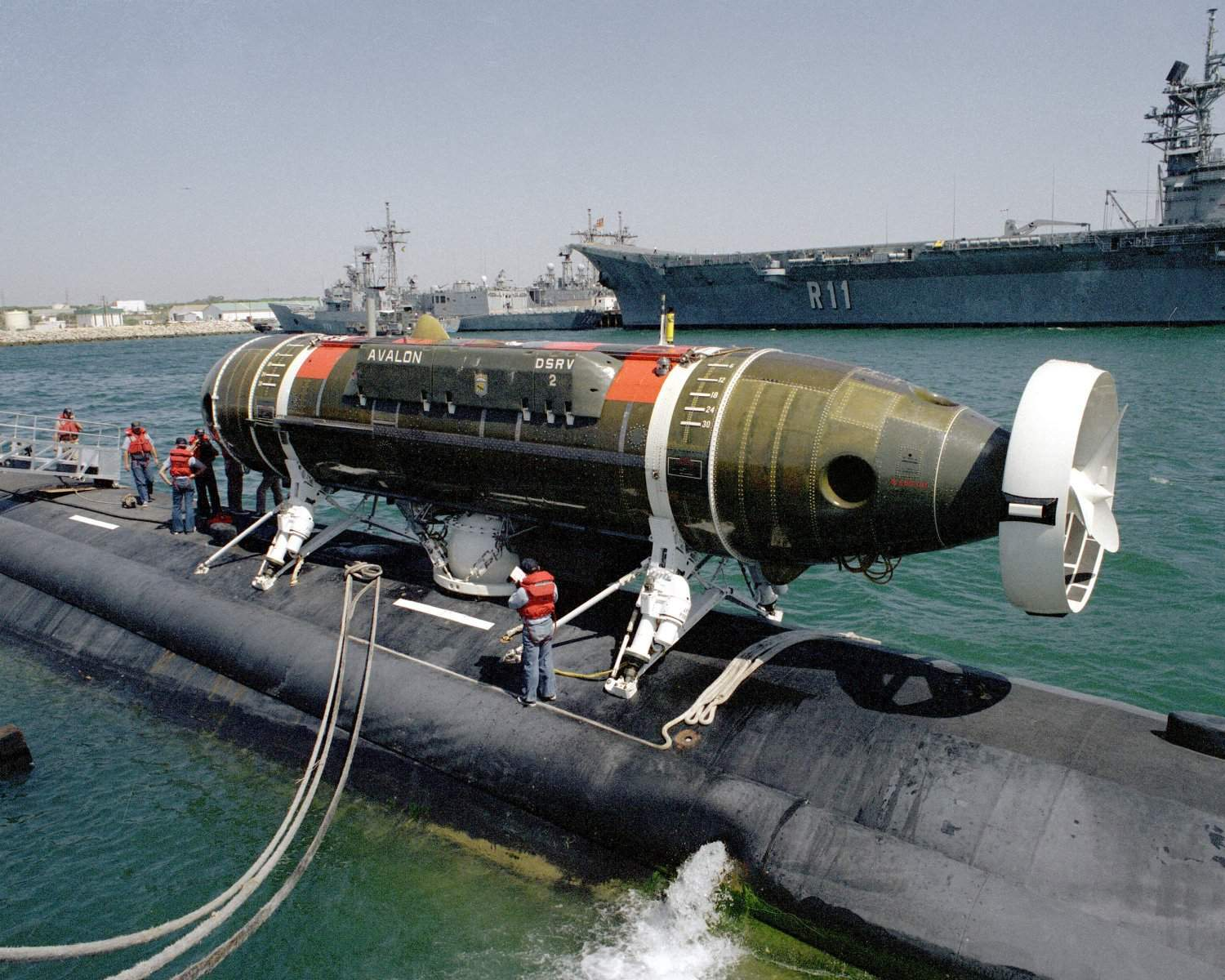
The Mystic-class deep submergence rescue vehicle DSRV-2 Avalon aboard Billfish.

Upon her commission, she was assigned to Submarine Development Group Two, based in Groton, Connecticut. She was deployed to the Mediterranean, participating in fleet exercises and tactical and sonar development tests. She was awarded the Battle Effectiveness Award for her performance in the Development Group.

In 1973, Billfish trailed the Soviet submarine K-279 in the Barents Sea, correctly identifying a new Soviet submarine radar present on K-279. In 1974, she witnessed a launch of the then newly-developed Soviet R-29 submarine-launched ballistic missile. For these actions, along with participation in several fleet exercises, she was awarded the Meritorous Unit Commendation 1in 1974.

Billfish participated in the 1977 Silver Jubilee Fleet Review.

Billfish was one of the few submarines fitted to carry the Mystic class deep submergence rescue vehicle during the 1980s.

Billfish spent the rest of her service career on regular deployments. Her last patrol, in the Arctic Ocean, ended in November 1997.

== Decommissioning and disposal ==
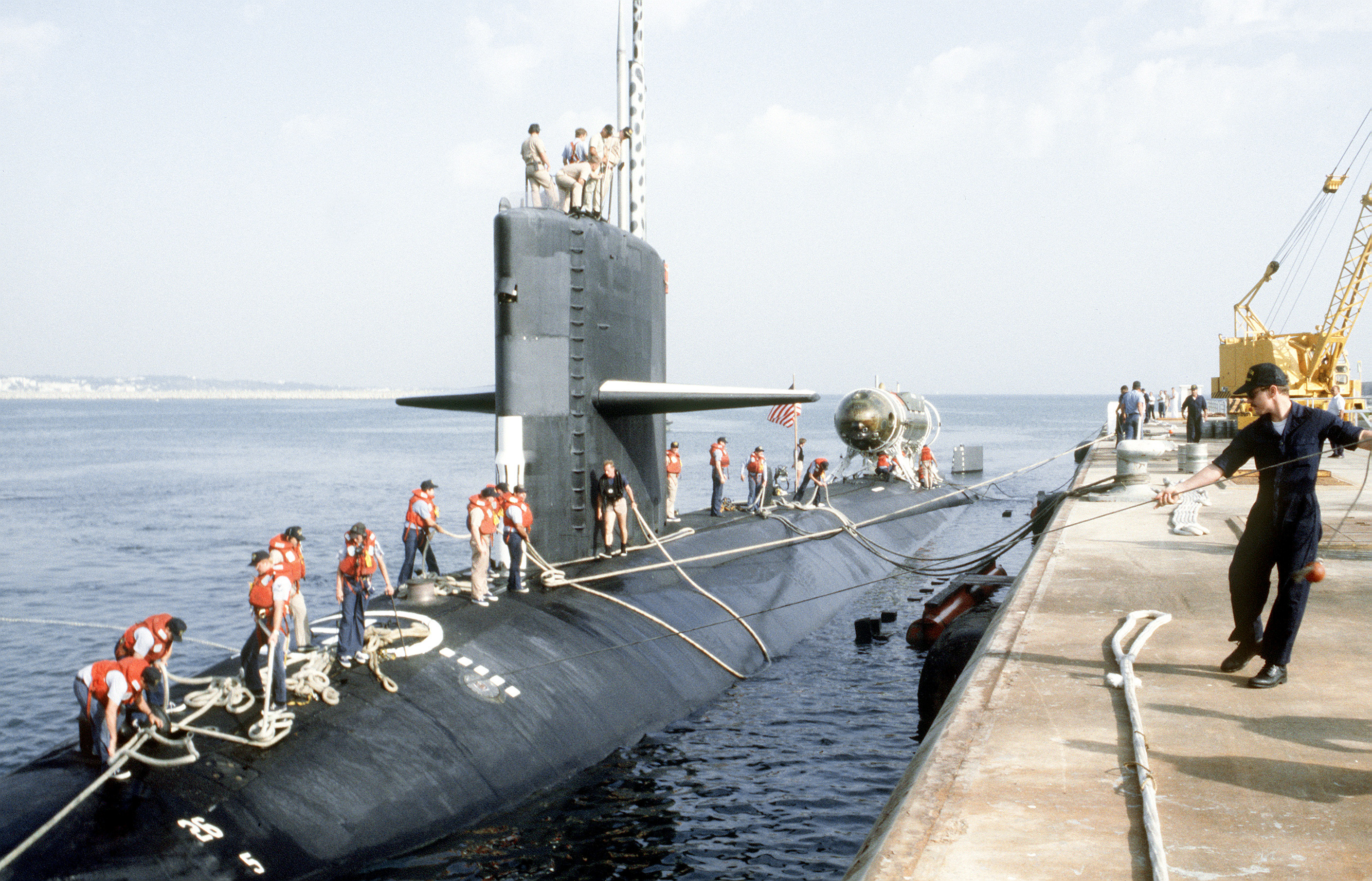
Billfish pierside.

Billfish was decommissioned on 1 July 1999 and stricken from the Naval Vessel Register the same day. Her scrapping was via the Nuclear-Powered Ship and Submarine Recycling Program at Puget Sound Naval Shipyard in Bremerton, Washington, was completed on 26 April 2000.
