= DSRV-1 Mystic =

US Navy deep-submergence rescue vehicle

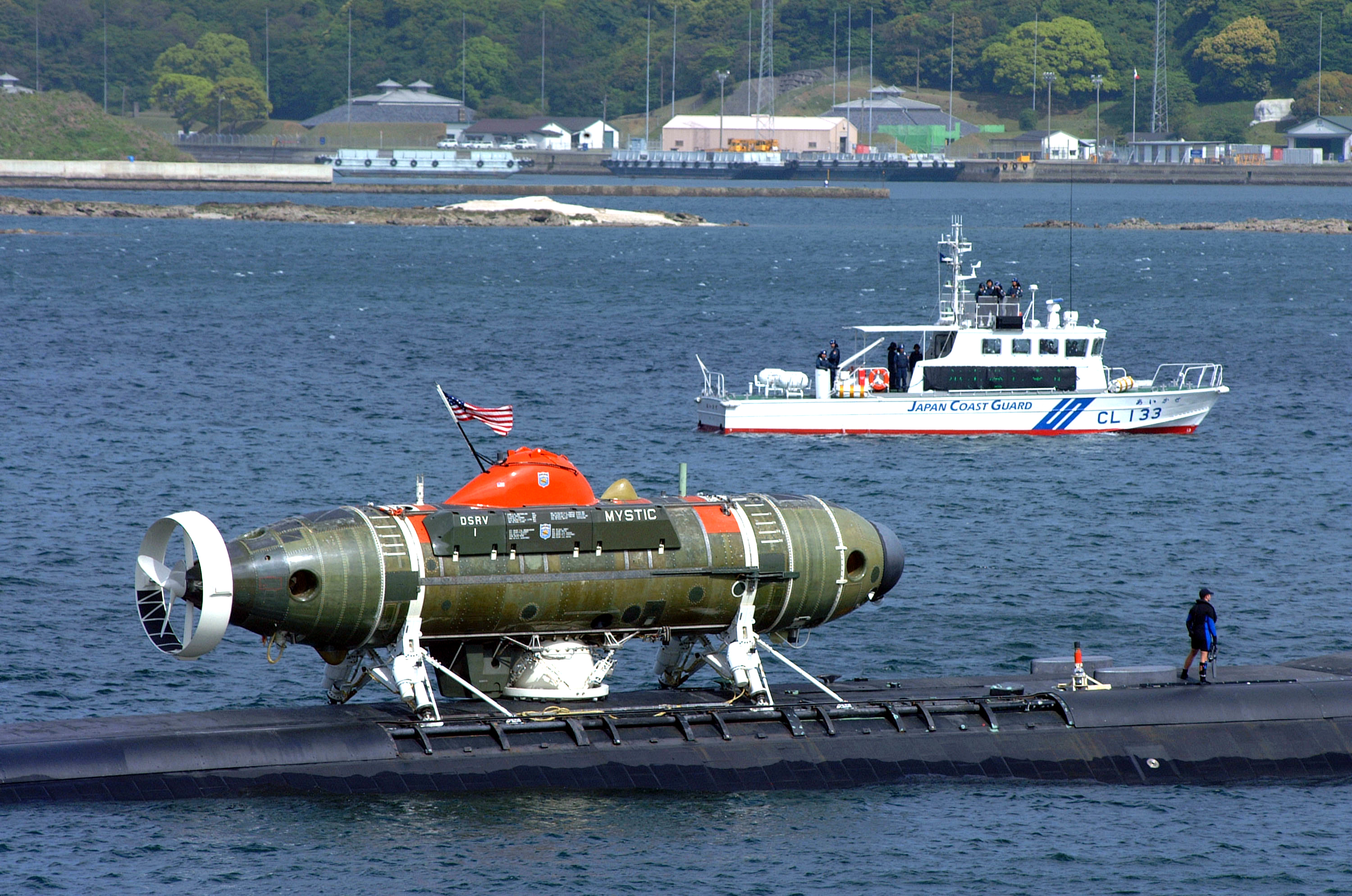
- DSRV-1 (Mystic) docked to a Los Angeles-class attack submarine.

History

United States
- Name: Official: DSRV-1; Unofficial: Mystic
- Namesake: The village of Mystic, Connecticut
- Builder: Lockheed Missiles and Space Company, Sunnyvale, California
- Launched: 24 January 1970
- Acquired: 1 June 1970
- Out of service: 1 October 2008

General characteristics
- Class & type: DSRV-1- (Mystic-) class deep submergence rescue vehicle
- Displacement: 30.5 tons surfaced, 37 tons submerged
- Length: 49 ft (15 m)
- Beam: 8 ft (2.4 m); Width 11 ft (3.4 m)
- Installed power: 15 shaft horsepower (11.2 kilowatt)
- Propulsion: Electric motors, silver-zinc batteries, one shaft, four thrusters
- Speed: 4 knots (7.4 km/h; 4.6 mph)
- Endurance: 30 hours submerged at 3 knots (5.6 km/h)
- Test depth: 5,000 feet (1,500 m)
- Capacity: 24 passengers
- Complement: Four (two pilots and two rescue personnel)

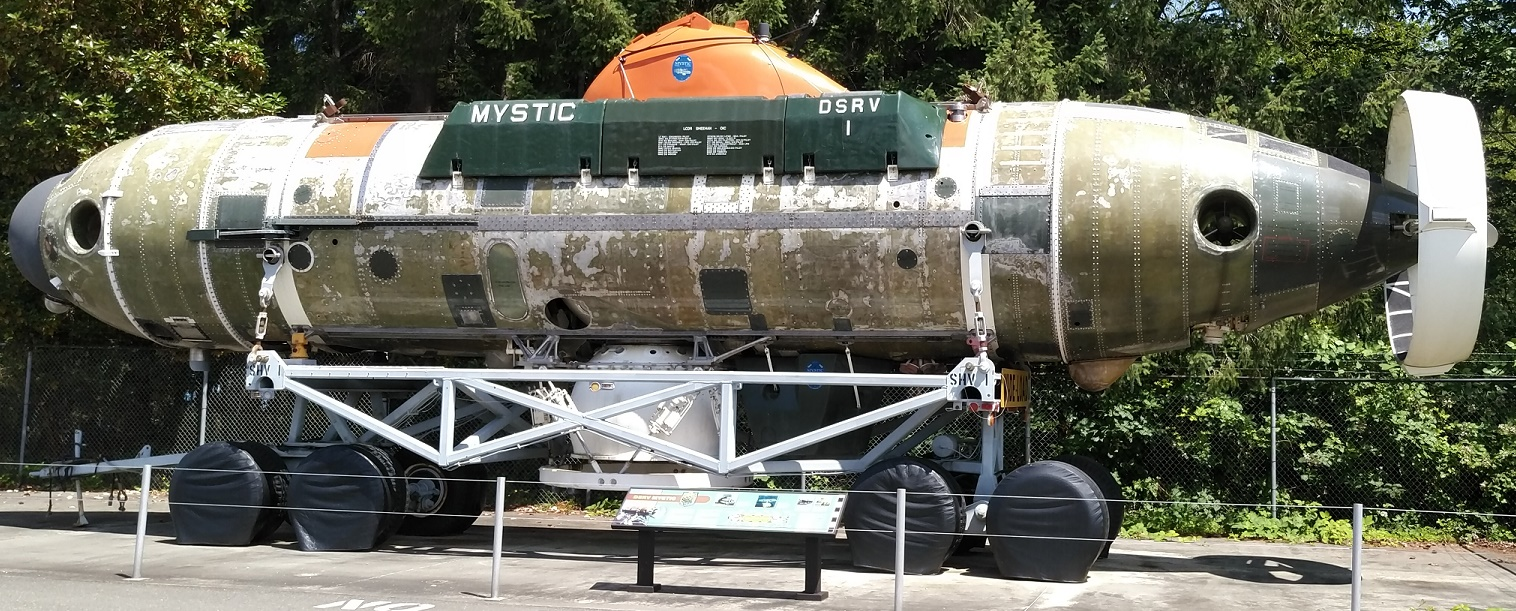
DSRV-1 Mystic on display at United States Naval Undersea Museum, Keyport, Washington

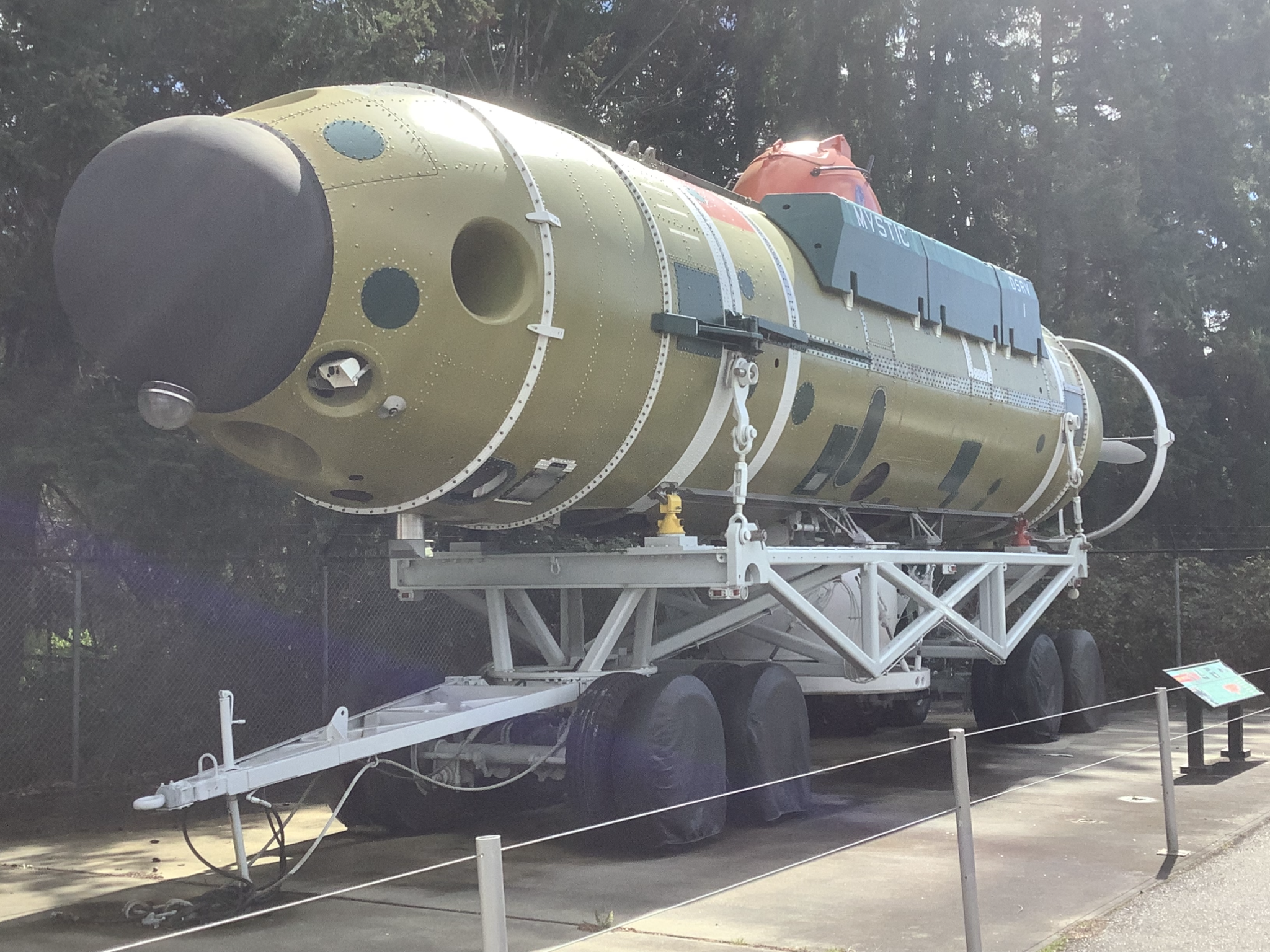
Mystic on display at the Naval Undersea Museum after 2021 restoration

DSRV-1 Mystic is a deep-submergence rescue vehicle that is rated to dive up to 5,000 feet (1,500 m). It was built by Lockheed for the US Navy at a construction cost of $41 million and launched 24 January 1970. It was declared fully operational in 1977 and named Mystic. The Mystic or the Avalon could be deployed to rescue survivors of a disabled submarine.

The submarine was intended to be air transportable; it was 50 feet (15 m) long and 8 feet (2.4 m) in diameter, and it weighed 37 tons. The sub was capable of descending to 5,000 feet (1,500 m) below the surface and could carry 24 passengers at a time, in addition to its crew. It was stationed at Naval Air Station North Island in San Diego and was never required to conduct an actual rescue operation. Mystic was replaced by the SRDRS on September 30, 2008, and began deactivation on October 1, 2008. In October 2014, the submarine was donated to the Naval Undersea Museum, and restored in February 2021.

== History ==
After the sinking of the submarine USS Thresher (SSN 593) in April 1963, the United States Navy discovered multiple limitations in deep sea rescue capabilities using the McCann's rescue bells, developed by Allan McCann in 1929. This led to the United States Navy creating the Deep Submergence Systems Project in 1964 to create a rescue vehicle for submarines. This project created two rescue submersibles, Mystic (DSRV 1) and Avalon (DSRV 2). The Mystic was launched in January 1970, and entered full operational status in 1977. It was eventually replaced in 2006 and replaced by the PRM (Pressurized Rescue Module) FALCON, which is part of the SRDRS (Submarine Rescue Diving and Recompression System). This updated system is easier and faster to deploy than the DSRVs, controlled remotely, and crew is transferred to a decompression to avoid sudden pressure changes.

== Design ==
The DSRV had to hover in place to access the disabled submarine. This was a difficult task to perform because of the ocean currents and the movement of the water. A special system was developed to control the ballast and the thrusters to make precise movements. This maneuverability meant that the DSRV could hold an underwater position of which is less than an inch of the target. It is capable of reaching a sunken ship on its own, landing on its rescue seat, creating a water tight connection between the sunken submarine and the rescue vehicle.

The hull of the submersible is made of fiberglass, with three interconnected compartments for the stranded crew. These compartments are made of high strength steel to protect the crew and rescuers. It can hold up to 24 survivors. The Mystic could operate at a maximum depth of 5,000 feet under the water.

The Mystic is equipped with electric propulsion, batteries, sonar, navigation systems, and communicating, operated by two pilots. The Mystic is also equipped with an arm to clear debris on hatches, which contains a combined gripper and cable cutter.

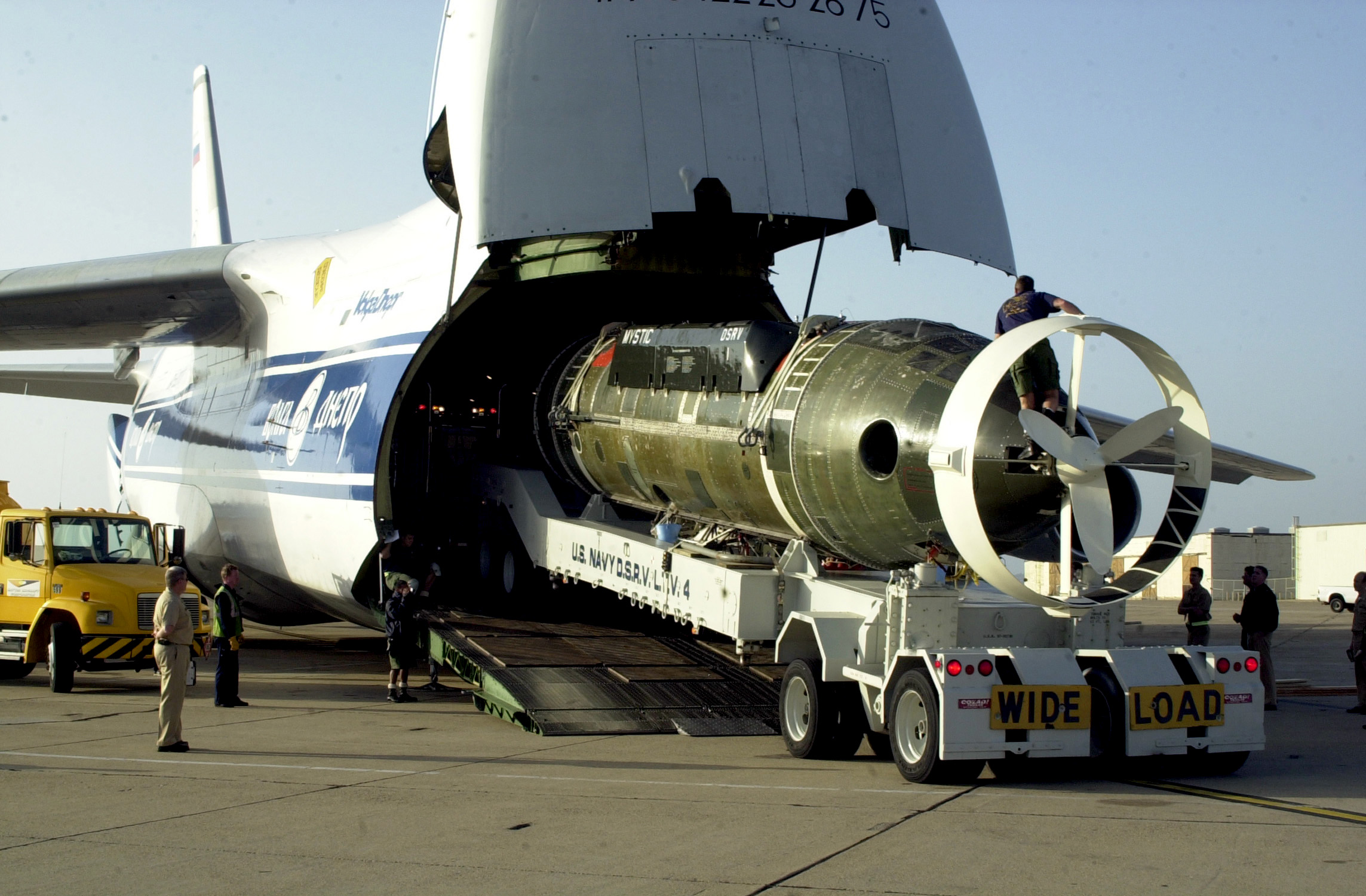
Mystic loaded aboard a Antonov An-124 cargo aircraft of Volga-Dnepr Airlines

== Operation and transport ==
The DSRV can be transported by sea, air and land and could be deployed anywhere in the world within 72 hours. It could be attached to a mother submarine or rescue ship and be carried to the distressed submarine. The DSRV attached to the distressed submarine's escape hatch creating a watertight seal, allowing survivors to move between the distressed submarine and the rescue vessel.

Numerous training and practice exercises were conducted, but it was never used for a real rescue operation.

== Characteristics of the vessel ==
Length: 49.7 feet

Width: 8.2 feet

Height: 9.5 feet

Speed: 4.1 knots (4.7 mi/hr)

Endurance: (12 hours at 3 knots (3.5 mi/hr)

Maximum Operating Depth: 5,000 feet

Capacity: 3-4 DSRV crew, 24 survivors per trip

Status: Decommissioned; Replaced by the Submarine Rescue Diving and Recompression System

== See also ==
- Mystic-class deep-submergence rescue vehicle – Class of US Navy submersible for rescue operations on submerged, disabled submarines
- DSRV-2 Avalon – Mystic-class deep-submergence rescue vehicle

== Awards ==
- Meritorious Unit Citation with 3 stars (4 awards)
- Navy E Ribbon (3 awards)
- National Defense Service Medal with star (2 awards)
