= Mystic-class deep-submergence rescue vehicle =

Class of US Navy submersible for rescue operations on submerged, disabled submarines

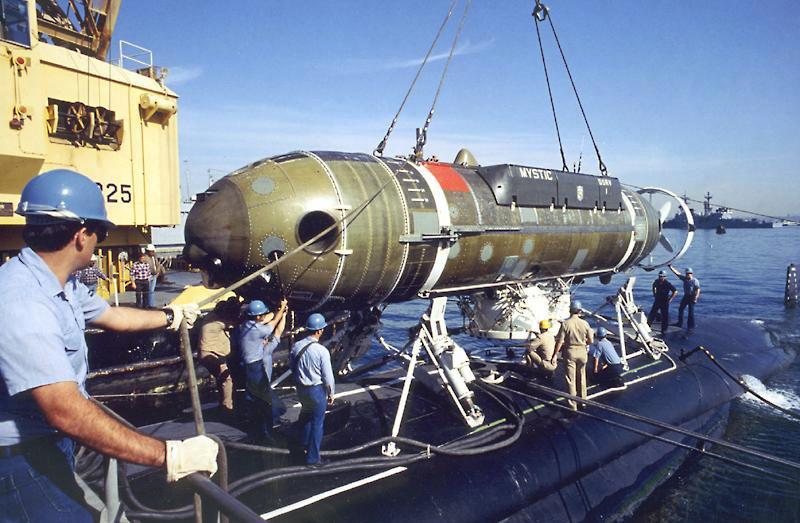
- U.S. Navy Deep-Submergence Rescue Vehicle (DSRV) Mystic

Class overview
- Builders: Lockheed Missiles and Space Company
- Operators: United States Navy
- Cost: $164.9 million [1972 prices] (program cost), ($935 million in 2024 dollars)
- Built: 1970
- In commission: 1971–2008
- Completed: 2
- Canceled: 10
- Retired: 2

General characteristics
- Test depth: 5,000 ft (1,500 m)

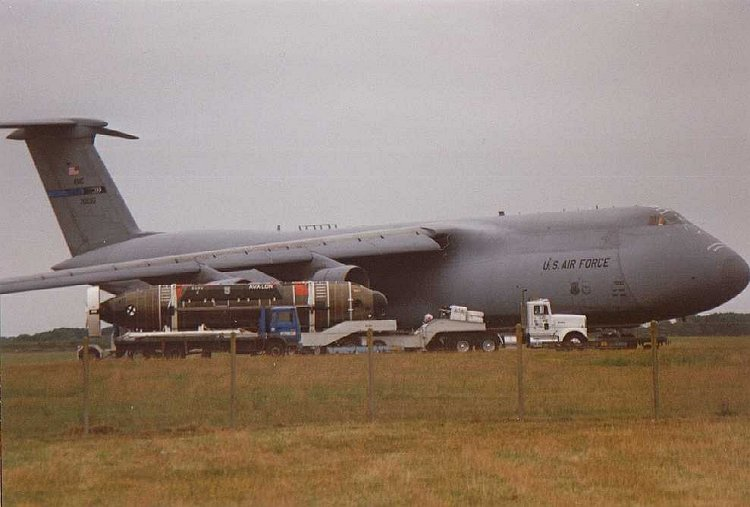
Arrival of the DSRV Avalon at Brest airport aboard a Lockheed C-5 Galaxy strategic airlifter

Mystic class is a class of deep-submergence rescue vehicles (DSRVs), designed for rescue operations on submerged, disabled submarines of the United States Navy or foreign navies. The two submarines of the class were never used for this purpose, and were replaced by the Submarine Rescue Diving Recompression System.

== Features ==
DSRVs are designed for quick deployment in the event of a submarine accident. DSRVs are transportable by truck, aircraft, ship, or by specially configured attack submarine. At the accident site, the DSRV works with either a "mother ship" or "mother submarine". The DSRV dives, conducts a sonar search, and attaches to the disabled submarine's hatch. DSRVs can embark up to 24 persons for transfer to the mother vessel.

The DSRV also has an arm to clear hatches on a disabled submarine and a combined gripper and cable cutter. The gripper is able to lift 1,000 pounds (450 kg).

== Background ==
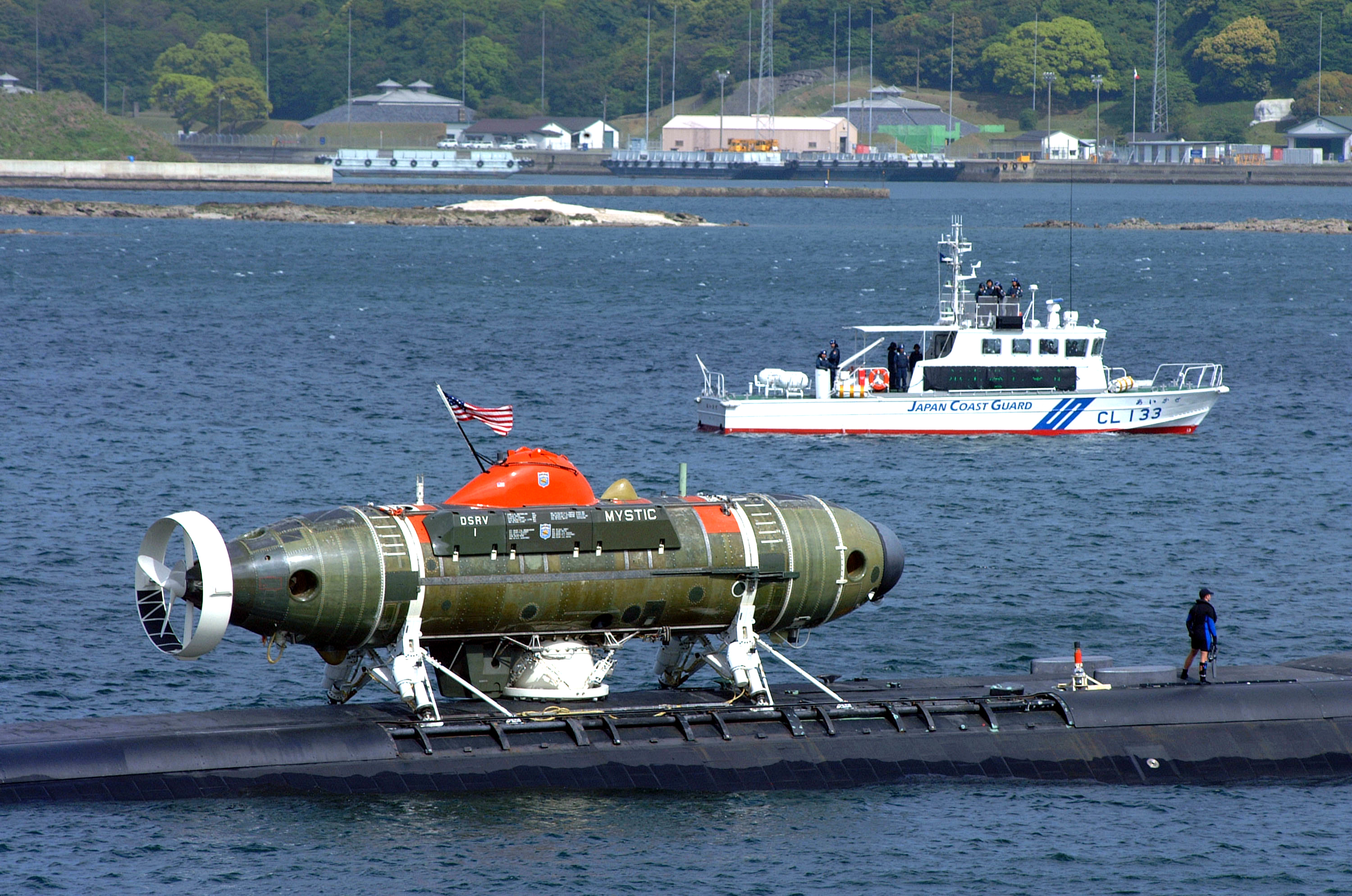
The U.S. Navy's Mystic secured to a Los Angeles class attack submarine

The Deep Submergence System Project was established in June 1965 in the aftermath of the loss of USS Thresher in 1963.

At the time, submarine operating depths greatly exceeded the capabilities of rescue vessels. Lockheed Missiles and Space Company was contracted to produce a deep diving rescue submarine. In an effort to win the design and construction contracts for a DSRV, the company built Deep Quest prototype. She was launched in June 1967; in March 1970, she was used to find a US Navy Grumman F6F-3 Hellcat which had crashed on 12 January 1944, in the ocean near Naval Air Station San Diego.

The first DSRV was launched in 1970. While it has been alleged that the stated goal of the DSRV project was unrealistic, and that it was a front for research on undersea espionage, including cable tapping, the DSRVs have a demonstrated rescue capability, and have conducted numerous practice rescue missions.

DSRV-1 was launched in San Diego, California, on 24 January 1970. Testing culminated in an operational evaluation that saw a complete, simulated submarine rescue mission. DSRV-1 was named Mystic during Fleet Acceptance Ceremonies in 1977.

The second, and final, vessel in the class, DSRV-2, was subsequently launched and named Avalon.

== General characteristics ==
| Builder: | Lockheed Missiles and Space Co., Sunnyvale, California |
| Power Plant: | Electric motors, silver/zinc batteries, one shaft, 15 shaft horsepower (11 kW), four thrusters, 7.5 horsepower (6 kW). |
| Length: | 49 ft (15 m) |
| Beam: | 8 ft (2.4 m) |
| Displacement: | 38 tons (39 metric tons) |
| Speed | 4 knots (7 km/h) |
| Maximum depth: | 5,000 ft (1500 m) |
| Sonar: | Search and navigation |
| Ships: | Mystic (DSRV 1) |
| Ships: | Avalon (DSRV 2) |
| Crew: | Two pilots, two rescue personnel and the capacity for 24 passengers |

== List of vessels ==
- DSRV-1 Mystic – US Navy deep-submergence rescue vehicle
- DSRV-2 Avalon – Mystic-class deep-submergence rescue vehicle

== Appearances in popular culture ==
DSRV-1 Mystic appears in the 1990 film The Hunt for Red October, and the 2018 film Hunter Killer.

== See also ==
- List of submarine classes in service
- Bathyscaphe
