= DSV Turtle =

US Navy crewed deep-ocean research submersible

Coordinates: 41°22′25.3″N 71°57′13.9″W

External videos
- "Diving into the Future DSV TURTLE part 1", Naval Sea Systems Command; twelve-minute YouTube video clip
- "Diving into the Future DSV TURTLE part 2", Naval Sea Systems Command; twelve-minute YouTube video clip

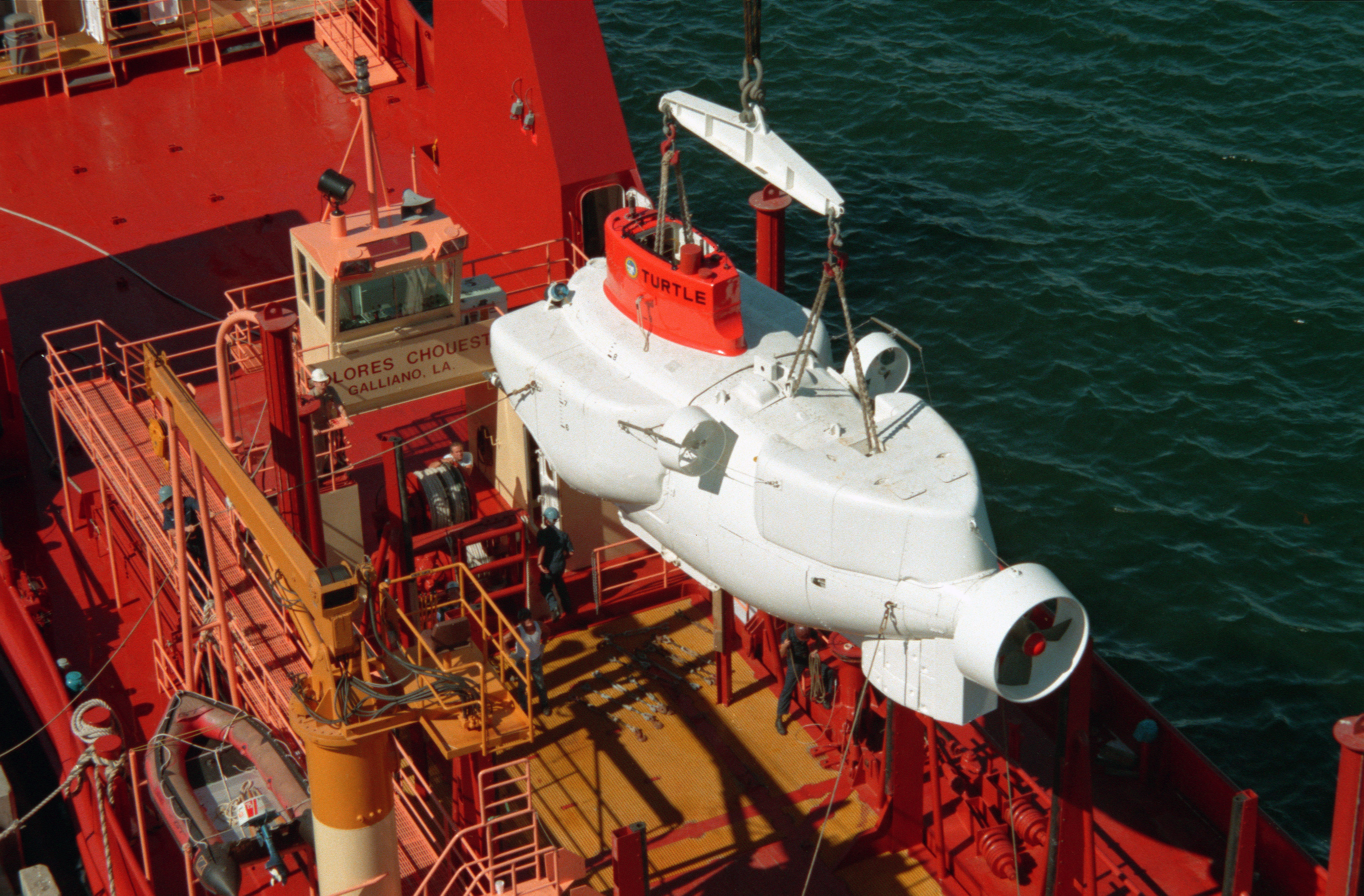
DSV Turtle hoisted from the deck of the support vessel MV Dolores Chouest

Turtle (DSV-3) was a 16-ton, crewed deep-ocean research submersible owned by the United States Navy. It is sister to Alvin (DSV-2) and Sea Cliff (DSV-4).

== History ==
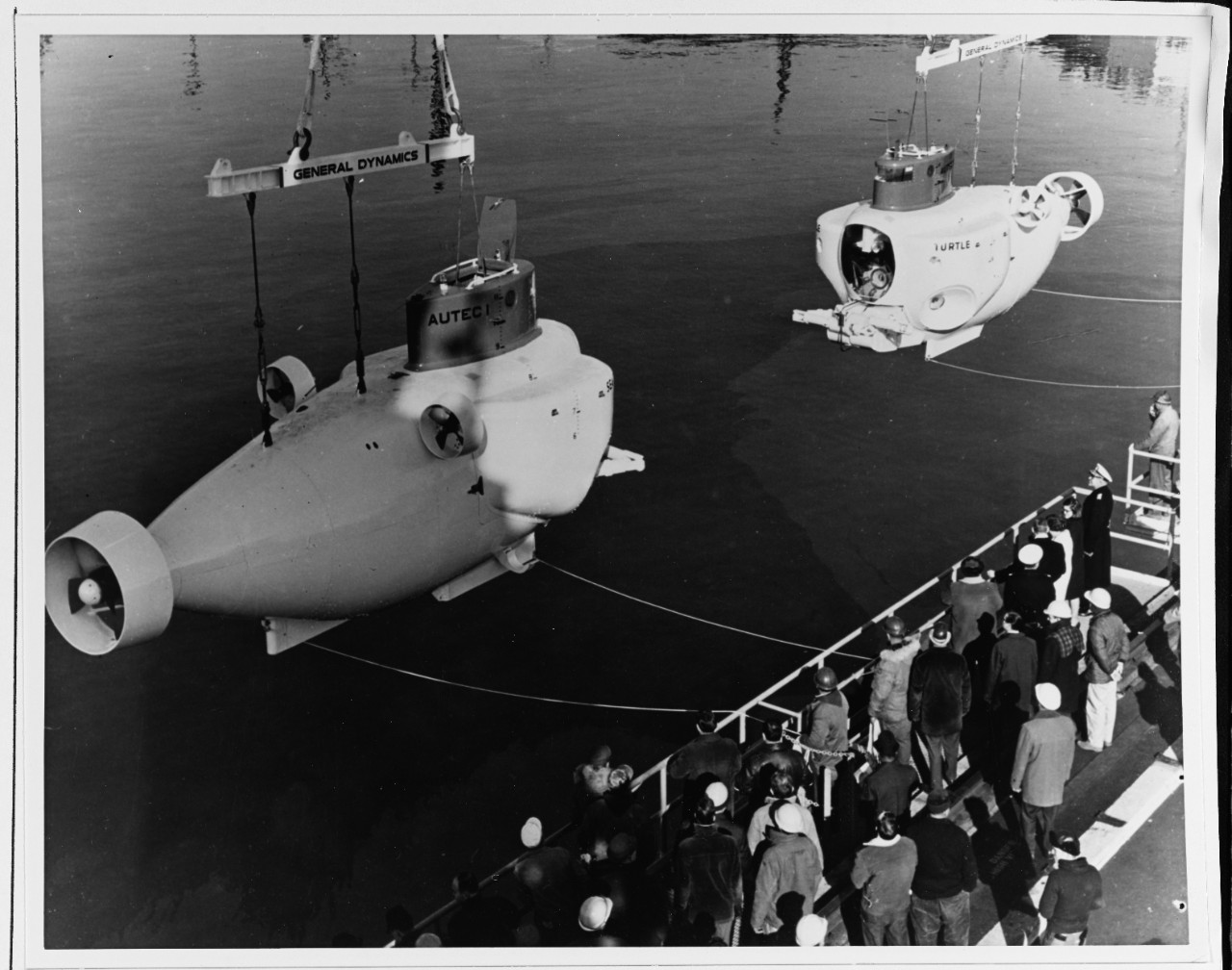
The two deep diving research vehicles at Groton, Connecticut. AUTEC I- later named Sea Cliff and AUTEC II, later named Turtle, 1 April 1969.

Turtle (DSV-3) was designed and built by the Electric Boat division of General Dynamics Corporation at Groton, Connecticut. Turtle and her sister Sea Cliff (DSV-4) were launched on December 11, 1968. Turtle was named after Turtle Town, a small community in Polk County, Tennessee. Her name also pays tribute to the American submarine Turtle which served in the American Revolution. Turtle was accepted by the US Navy on September 25, 1970 at Woods Hole, Massachusetts.

Turtle was designed to dive to 6500 feet. When DSV-2 Alvin installed a new titanium hull, the Alvin steel hull was installed in the Turtle. The original steel hull was acquired by the Mariners' Museum and Park in 2000 and became a part of the exhibition. The Turtle depth rating was then increased to 10,000 feet. The Alvin-class DSV's were designed to replace older DSV, such as the less maneuverable Trieste-class bathyscaphes.

Turtle spent her career as a unit of the U.S. Navy's Submarine Development Group 1 in San Diego, California.

The Turtle was retired from active service on October 1, 1997. It was stricken from the US Navy Register on April 15, 1998.

It has been on display at the Mystic Aquarium in Mystic, Connecticut since 1999.

== Awards ==
Turtle earned one National Defense Service Medal in 1970. In addition to that she was awarded with the Navy Meritorious Unit Commendation (MUC) in 1982, 1983 and 1990.

== In fiction ==
In fiction, she was featured in the 1980 film Raise the Titanic; she was one of several submersibles in the salvage fleet, and one of two (along with the fictional NUMA submersible Deep Quest) that actually discovered the wreck.

== Alvin class DSV ==
- DSV Alvin (DSV-2)
- DSV Sea Cliff (DSV-4)
- Nemo (DSV-5)

== See also ==
- Deep-submergence vehicle – Self-propelled deep-diving crewed submersible
- Deep-submergence rescue vehicle – Submersible used for rescue of people from disabled submarines and submersibles
- Bathyscaphe Trieste – Deep sea scientific submersible
- Bathyscaphe Trieste II – US Navy's second bathyscaphe
