= HSwMS Belos (A214) =

Swedish submarine help ship

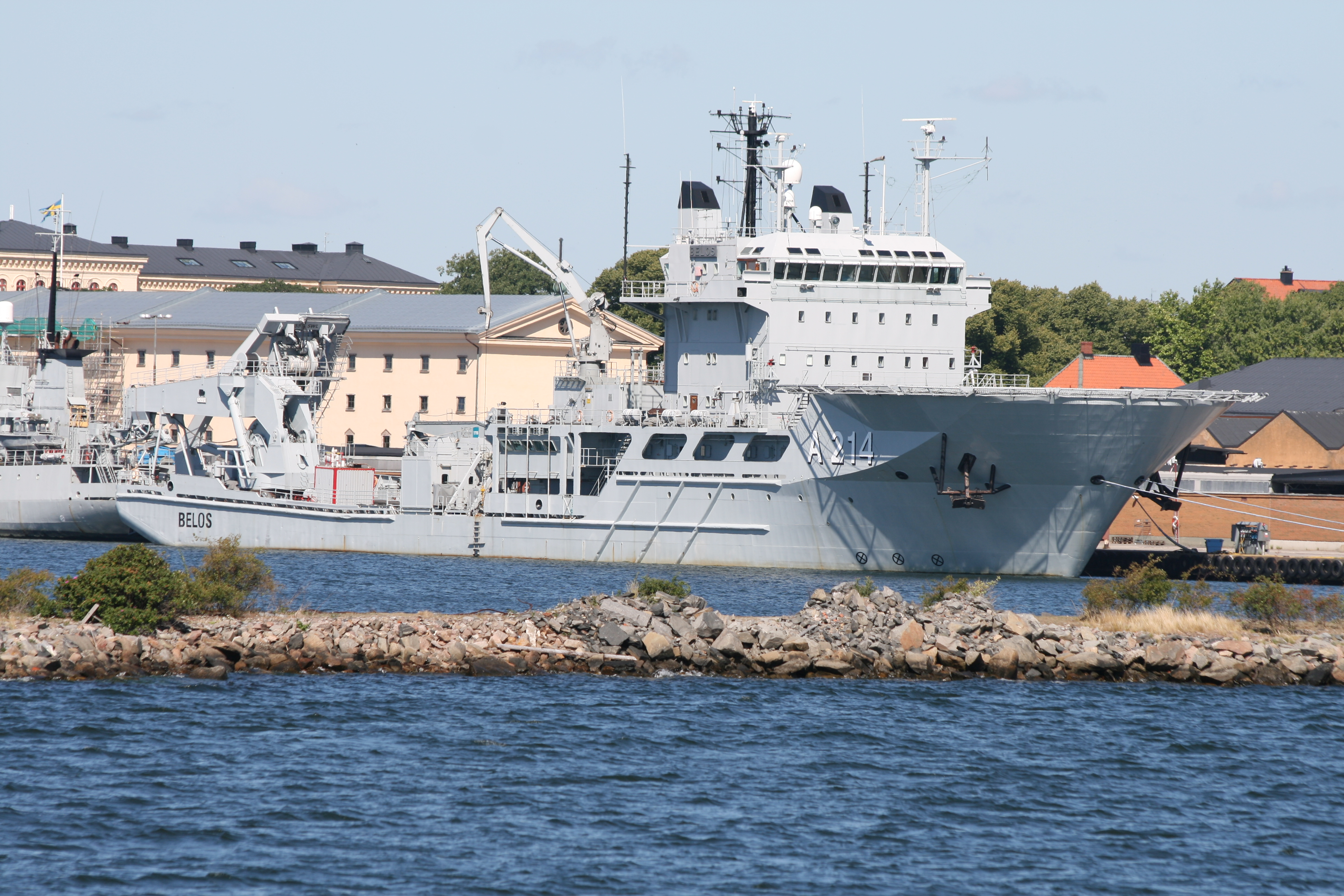
- HSwMs Belos at Karlskrona in 2008

History

Sweden
- Name: Belos
- Builder: Shipyard De Hoop, Netherlands
- Launched: 1985
- Acquired: 1992
- Identification: IMO number: 8308288; MMSI number: 265402000; Callsign: SELT
- Notes: Previously Energy Supporter
- Badge

General characteristics
- Type: Submarine rescue ship
- Displacement: 6,150 t (6,050 long tons)
- Length: 104.9 m (344 ft 2 in)
- Beam: 18.0 m (59 ft 1 in)
- Draft: 5.1 m (16 ft 9 in)
- Propulsion: MAN 9ASL 25/30 Two Azimuth thrusters at 1,840 kw each
- Speed: 13 knots (24 km/h; 15 mph)
- Complement: 40
- Notes: Five cranes with a lifting capacity of 5, 6, 10, 55 and 100 tonnes respectively

HSwMS Belos (A214) is a submarine rescue ship in the Swedish Navy's 1st Submarine flotilla. She carries the submarine rescue vehicle (SRV) URF. She is also capable of carrying the NATO Submarine Rescue System (NSRS). As of 2017 HSwMS Belos was the largest ship by displacement in the Swedish Navy. Belos is traditionally the name of the Swedish Navy's submarine rescue vessel and she is the third ship with that name.

== Description ==
Originally built as a diving support vessel, Belos was launched in 1985 at the Dutch shipyard De Hoop operated in the international offshore business named Energy Supporter. In 1992, she was purchased for the Royal Swedish Navy, renamed to Belos, and has since been redesigned into an advanced diving and submarine rescue ship. Belos, with the submarine rescue vessel URF was the first submarine rescue system that could perform transfer under pressure (TUP) from a disabled submarine, via the rescue vessel to a decompression chamber system for treatment to avoid decompression sickness.

Normally, the ship does not anchor but hovers at the distressed submarine using her azimuth- and bow thrusters, and a dynamic positioning (DP) system. Onboard Belos, an extensive array of remotely operated underwater vehicles (ROVs), oceanographic equipment, craneage, diving-, medical-, and decompression facilities are accessible. Different sonar systems attached to the hull and towed astern of the Belos can be used for searching distressed submarines or other objects at the seabed. The Belos along with the SRV URF compose the backbone of the Swedish Submarine Escape and Rescue System.

Belos can perform diving and underwater tasks using a wet bell and ROVs. The ability to perform various types of underwater work is essential for submarine rescue operations. If the mating area to which the rescue vessel is to connect with the distressed submarine is covered by debris, fishing nets or other obstacles, these obstacles must be removed before mating the rescue vessel to the submarine. For smaller submarines or crewed submersibles, the rescue operation may be cutting free the vessel itself if it is snagged by e.g. nets or cables and unable to surface (see AS-28). The wet-bell is used for air-diving with two divers at a time to a maximum depth of 60 metres (200 ft). The divers are equipped with hot-water suits, TV cameras, and constant communication with the diving supervisor on board the Belos. A slide leads from the divers' exit point to the chamber to speed up the surface decompression process.

The underwater vehicles are all equipped with positioning systems, TV cameras, and sonar systems, allowing them to operate in conditions of poor visibility. The maximum diving depth is 1,000 metres (3,300 ft) and underwater work is performed by using hydraulic manipulators with a range of interchangeable tools.

The Belos has a large craneage capacity. For lifting, craneage with a capacity of 5, 6, 10 or 100 tons is available. In addition, an A-frame in the stern with a capacity of 55 tons is used for handling the submarine rescue vessel URF.

=== Refits ===
Initially, the 100-ton crane was used for launching and recovering URF, a method rather unreliable during rough weather, leading to the construction and installation of a 55 ton A-frame aft. The decompression chamber system was improved leading to a decompression capacity of 40 people at a time, including rescuees, medical personnel, and chamber attendants. The system consists of three cylinders divided into four main chambers. In co-operation with the UK Royal Navy resulted in the UK submarine rescue vessel LR5 being fully operational from HSwMS Belos including TUP capacity. This cooperation is now replaced with the NATO Submarine Rescue System which is fully operational from Belos. In November 2017 the Royal Netherlands Navy joined the co-operation.

The ship saw the installation of TUP connection system that can be maximally pressurised to the equivalent of 50 metre sea water (msw) with direct access to the chamber system. The ship also saw improvements of the DP system.

During the 2024 Estlink 2 incident Finland requested Swedens assistance in searching the seabed in the Gulf of Finland for hints regarding the possible sabotage of underwater cables. Sweden announced the deployment of Belos on 3 January 2025, the crew managed to locate the missing anchor of the suspected vessel Eagle S on 7 January.
