= DSV Sea Cliff =

US Navy crewed deep-ocean research submersible

DSV-4 (formerly known as Sea Cliff) is a 25-ton, crewed deep-ocean research submersible owned by the United States Navy, now known only by its hull number, not by its former name.

DSV-4 is an Alvin-class deep submergence vehicle (DSV), a sister ship to Turtle (DSV-3) and Alvin (DSV-2). The Alvin-class DSVs were designed to replace older DSVs, such as the less-maneuverable Trieste-class bathyscaphes. Sea Cliff was built by Electric Boat in Groton, Connecticut for the U.S. Navy and was completed in December 1968. It spent much of its service life on loan to the Woods Hole Oceanographic Institution.

DSV-4 initially had a maximum dive depth of 6,500 feet (2,000 m); all Alvin-class personnel pressure hulls were originally designed for 6,000 ft (1,800 m), but subsequent testing allowed a higher rating. In 1981, the submersible was refitted with a titanium personnel hull to dive to 20,000 ft (6,100 m). With the refit of DSV-4, the bathyscaphe DSV-1 (formerly known as Trieste II) was retired from service.

In 1985 the Sea Cliff made a record dive for this vessel type by diving 20,000 feet off Guatemala's Pacific Coast. The crew of the dive consisted of NAVSEA system certification representative/command pilot, LCDR Rick Williams, mission pilot Lt. Alan Mason, and co-pilot Chief Petty Officer David Atchinson. From late September to early October 1990, over a course of 6 days, DSV-4 recovered the cargo door of United Airlines Flight 811 from the Pacific Ocean.

DSV-4 has a plug hatch 2 feet (0.61 m) in diameter, held in place mechanically with hatch dogs and, while submerged, by the pressure of the water above it.

Sea Cliff was retired from active service in 1998 and subsequently given to Woods Hole Oceanographic Institution (WHOI). As of 2019, the Naval Vessel Register shows DSV-4 was returned to active U.S. Navy service on September 30, 2002, in the custody of Woods Hole.

Although an article in The New York Times from 1998 indicated that DSV-4 would be cannibalized to upgrade Alvin, this appears to not have taken place since: 1) the US Navy Vessel Registry shows DSV-4 as an active vessel; 2) a photo from 2005 shows DSV-4 to still be intact with its personnel pressure sphere; and 3) WHOI in its official history of Alvin does not discuss using DSV-4 parts during this timeframe. As of September 2023, WHOI does not list DSV-4 as one of their underwater vehicles.

== Awards ==
- Meritorious Unit Citation with three stars
- Navy E Ribbon (2 awards)
- National Defense Service Medal with two stars
- Global War on Terrorism Service Medal

== See also ==
- Deep-submergence rescue vehicle – Submersible used for rescue of people from disabled submarines and submersibles
