= Australian submarine rescue vehicle Remora =

Diving bell operated by the Australian Navy

History

Australia
- Name: Remora
- Namesake: Remora
- Builder: OceanWorks International, North Vancouver, British Columbia
- In service: 1995–2006

General characteristics
- Type: Submarine rescue vehicle
- Displacement: 16.5 tonnes (18.2 tons)
- Test depth: Over 500 metres (1,600 ft)
- Capacity: 6 passengers
- Crew: 1 onboard operator, 12 personnel on surface
- Time to activate: 36 hours to transport + 25 hours to fit and deploy

Australian submarine rescue vehicle Remora (ASRV Remora) was a submarine rescue vehicle used by the Royal Australian Navy (RAN) between 1995 and 2006. The name comes from the remora, a small fish that can attach itself to larger marine life, and has the backronym "Really Excellent Method of Rescuing Aussies".

Remora was constructed by OceanWorks International of North Vancouver, British Columbia for the RAN, based on a diving bell. The 16.5-tonne (18.2-ton) vehicle was designed to mate with a submarine's escape tower, and could do this even if the submarine had rolled up to 60 degrees from vertical. The vehicle can operate at depths over 500 metres (1,600 ft) and in currents of up to 3 knots (5.6 km/h; 3.5 mph), and was intended for use below 180 metres (590 ft); the maximum safe depth for Submarine Escape Immersion Equipment. The submersible carried seven people: an onboard operator and six passengers. Those aboard Remora were kept under about five bars of pressure, and rescued submariners exited into one of two 36-man recompression chambers carried aboard the rescue ship.

Remora could be controlled from a containerised facility aboard the rescue ship, with power, control, and sensors fed through an armoured umbilical cable. Twelve personnel make up the surface control complement, with this number supplemented by diving medicine specialists and divers. The entire setup (Remora, control centre, and recompression chambers) could be transported by road or sea, or loaded into C-130 Hercules aircraft. Remora could be delivered to anywhere in Australia within 36 hours, and installed on a suitable vessel in another 25 hours. The Defence Maritime Services tender Seahorse Spirit was designated the main tender for Remora, although any vessel with sufficient space to carry and deploy the equipment (300-square-metre (3,200 sq ft) of deck space, with 8 metres (26 ft) minimum width) could be used.

In December 2006, the umbilical cable parted during an exercise off Perth, trapping two men at a depth of 140 metres (460 ft) for 12 hours. The men were rescued, but Remora was not recovered until April 2007. The submersible was sent back to OceanWorks for repairs. Although repairs were completed, Remora did not reenter service as the Det Norske Veritas classification society refused to certify the submersible; the launch and recovery equipment did not meet updated safety standards. As of the end of 2008, Remora was in storage at Henderson, Western Australia. To cover the capability loss, the Department of Defence arranged for the British LR5 submersible to be flown to Australia if submarine rescue was required. In June 2009, LR5 was relocated to Australia on lease.

Remora was the basis for the United States Navy's Submarine Rescue Diving Recompression System.
