= MV Dolores Chouest =

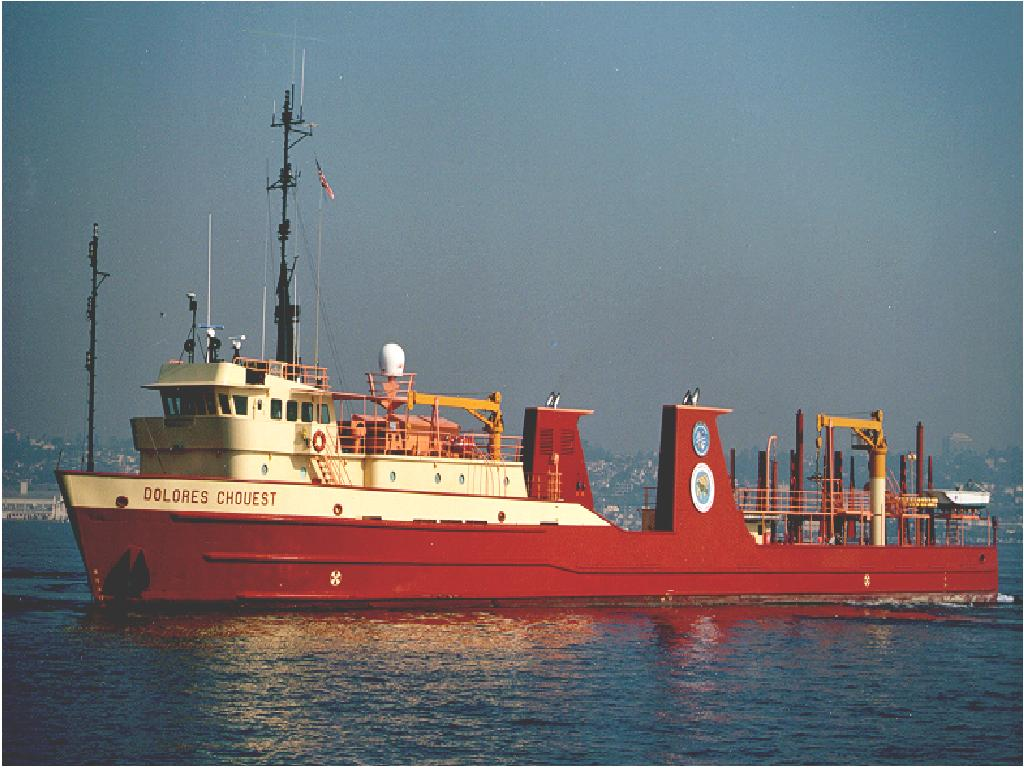

History

United States
- Name: Dolores Chouest
- Namesake: Mrs. Dolores Chouest, wife of ECO founder, Mr. Edison Chouest, Sr.
- Operator: Military Sealift Command
- Ordered: June 2000
- Builder: North American Shipbuilding, Larouse, Louisiana
- Launched: 28 November 2006
- In service: 15 February 2007
- Home port: Little Creek, Virginia
- Identification: IMO number: 8225931; MMSI number: 338678000; Callsign: WCP8847
- Status: Active

General characteristics
- Type: Submarine and special warfare support vessels
- Displacement: 1,500 long tons (1,500 t)
- Length: 240 ft (73 m)
- Beam: 40 ft (12 m)
- Draft: 12 ft (3.7 m)
- Propulsion: Diesel
- Speed: 12 knots (22 km/h; 14 mph)
- Complement: 32 military/sponsor personnel
- Armament: none

MV Dolores Chouest is a specifically built surrogate ship, to DSV Alvin-class submersibles and other military rescue ships. She provides surface support for special warfare exercise missions, submarine sea trials/deep dives, naval mine recovery operations (inert mines only) and unmanned vehicle operations and mother ship support for submarine rescue chamber operations. The contract was valued at $19.9 million for four years if all options are exercised. The Dolores Chouest is based in Joint Expeditionary Base Little Creek–Fort Story, Virginia to help support emergency roles in the Atlantic ocean. These ships serve emergency needs in the case that a submarine experiences catastrophic failure while underway. These ships are also used for scientific surveys and have been used in various salvage operations. The Dolores Chouest can support all the submersibles and divers while other cargo craft are nearby to transfer raised goods.

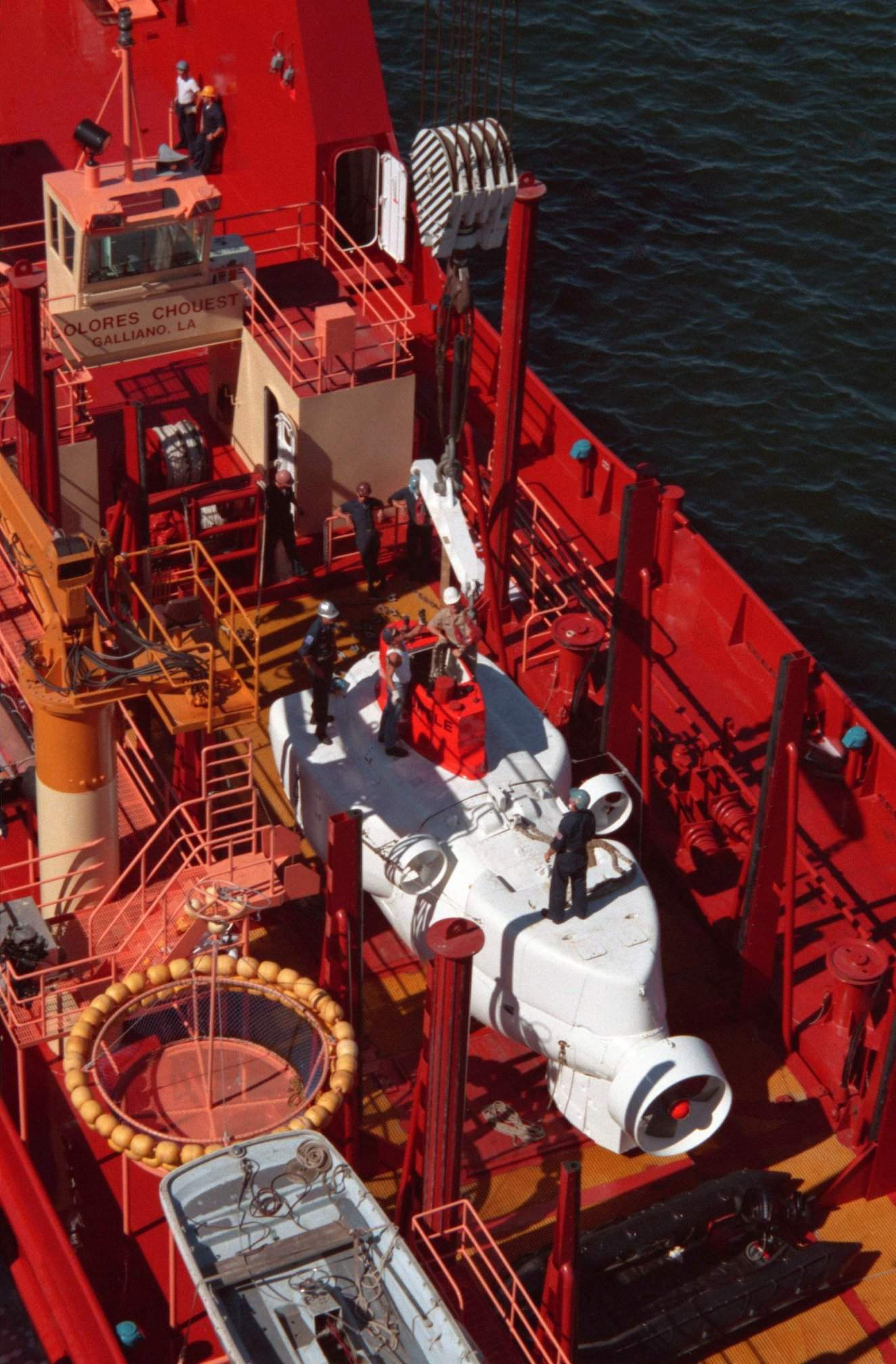
The US Navy 21-ton deep submergence vehicle Turtle (DSV-3), Submarine Development Squadron 5 is prepared for hoisting from the deck of the Military Sealift Command's submarine support vessel MV Dolores Chouest at Naval Air Station North Island, California.
