= DSRV-2 Avalon =

Mystic-class deep-submergence rescue vehicle

Coordinates: 35°22.202′N 120°51.309′W

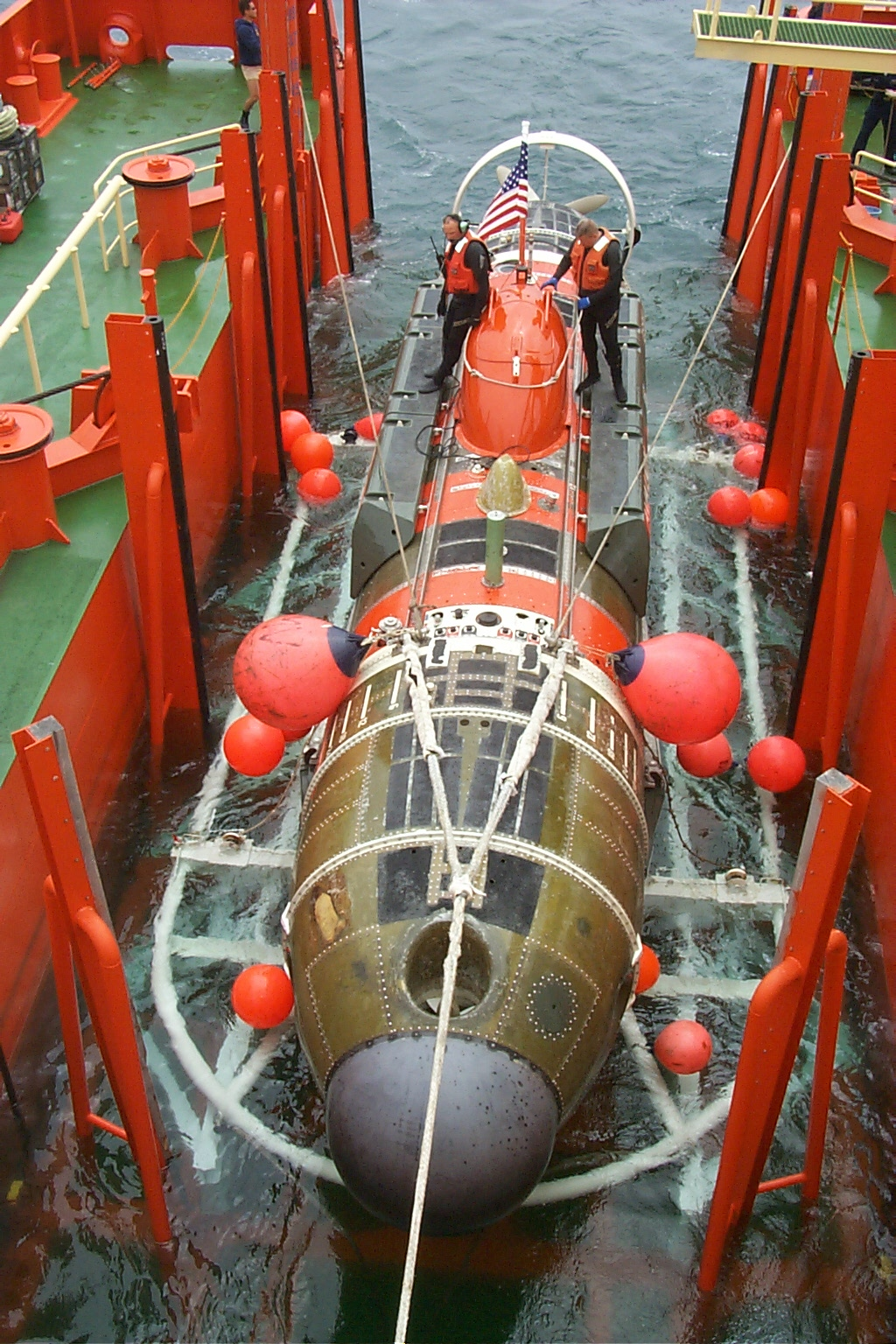
- Avalon (DSRV-2) aboard a support ship.

History

United States
- Name: Official: DSRV-2; Unofficial: Avalon
- Builder: Lockheed Missiles and Space Company, Sunnyvale, California
- Launched: 1971
- Out of service: 2000

General characteristics
- Class & type: DSRV-1- (Mystic-) class deep submergence rescue vehicle
- Displacement: 30.5 tons surfaced, 37 tons submerged
- Length: 49 ft (15 m)
- Beam: 8 ft (2.4 m); Width 11 ft (3.4 m)
- Installed power: 15 shaft horsepower (11 kW)
- Propulsion: Electric motors, silver-zinc batteries, one shaft, four thrusters
- Speed: 4 knots (7.4 km/h; 4.6 mph)
- Endurance: 30 hours submerged at 3 knots (5.6 km/h)
- Test depth: 5,000 feet (1,500 meters)
- Capacity: 24 passengers
- Complement: Four (two pilots and two rescue personnel)

DSRV-2 Avalon was a Mystic-class deep-submergence rescue vehicle rated to dive up to 5,000 feet (1,500 m) to rescue submarine crews trapped deep under the sea. The submarine was acquired in response to the loss of the USS Thresher, so that the Navy would have a way to rescue trapped submarine crews.

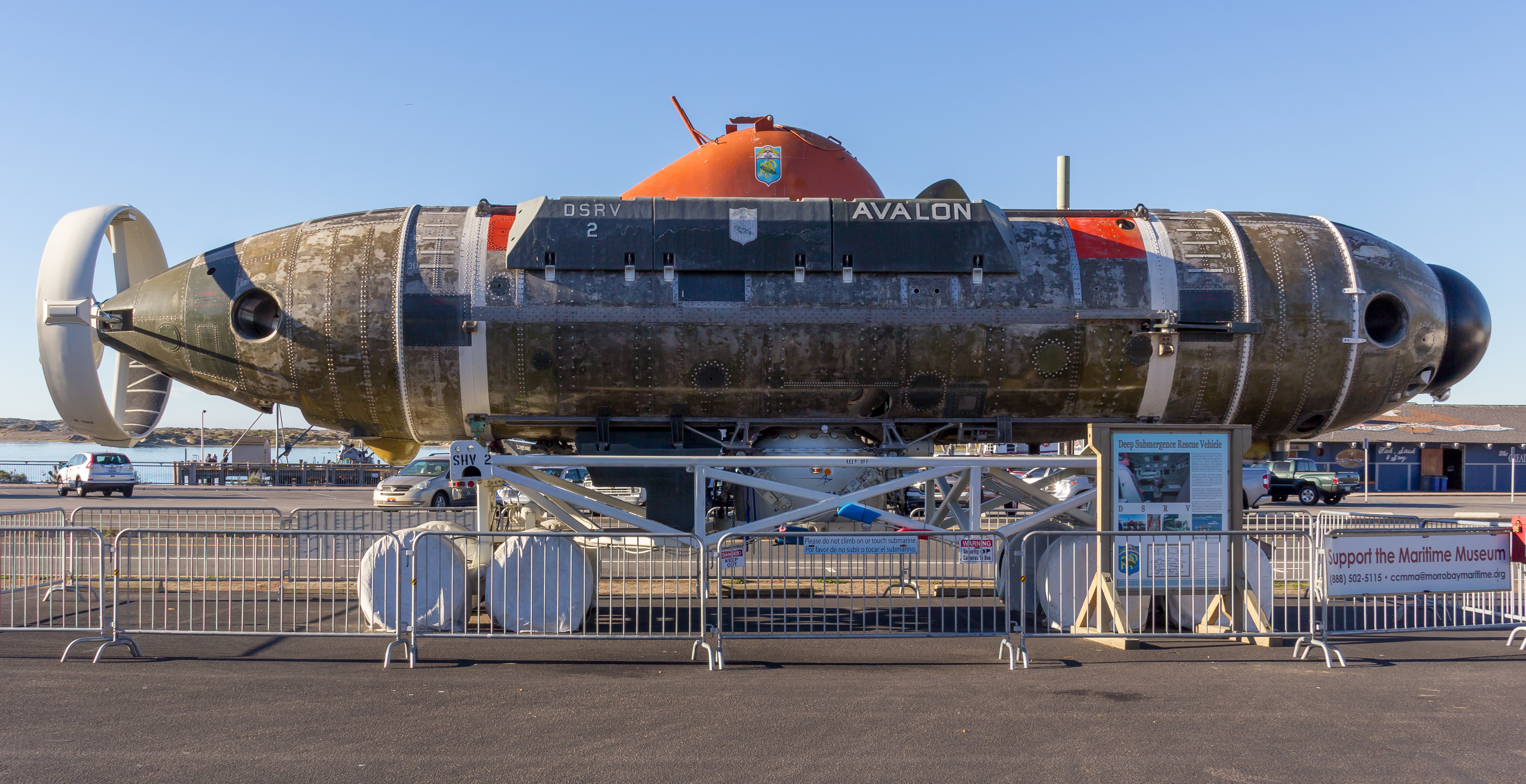
Avalon at Morro Bay

Avalon was launched in 1971. The submarine, intended to be air transportable, is 50 feet (15 m) long, 8 feet (2.4 m) in diameter, and weighs 37 tons. The sub is capable of descending to 5,000 feet (1,500 m) below the surface and could carry 24 passengers at a time in addition to her crew. Avalon is battery-powered, and would have needed to pause midway through a rescue mission to recharge its batteries.

Avalon was stationed at North Island Naval Station in San Diego and was never required to conduct an actual rescue operation. The sub was decommissioned in 2000. The Avalon submarine was donated to the Morro Bay Maritime Museum in Morro Bay, California, and is currently on public display.

== Awards ==
- Meritorious Unit Commendation with star (2 awards)
- Navy E Ribbon (2 awards)
- National Defense Service Medal with star (2 awards)

== In fiction ==
- Avalon features in the 1984 Tom Clancy novel The Hunt for Red October and the 1990 film adaptation.

== See also ==
- Mystic-class deep-submergence rescue vehicle
- DSRV-1 Mystic – US Navy deep-submergence rescue vehicle
