= Deep-submergence rescue vehicle =

Submersible used for rescue of people from disabled submarines and submersibles

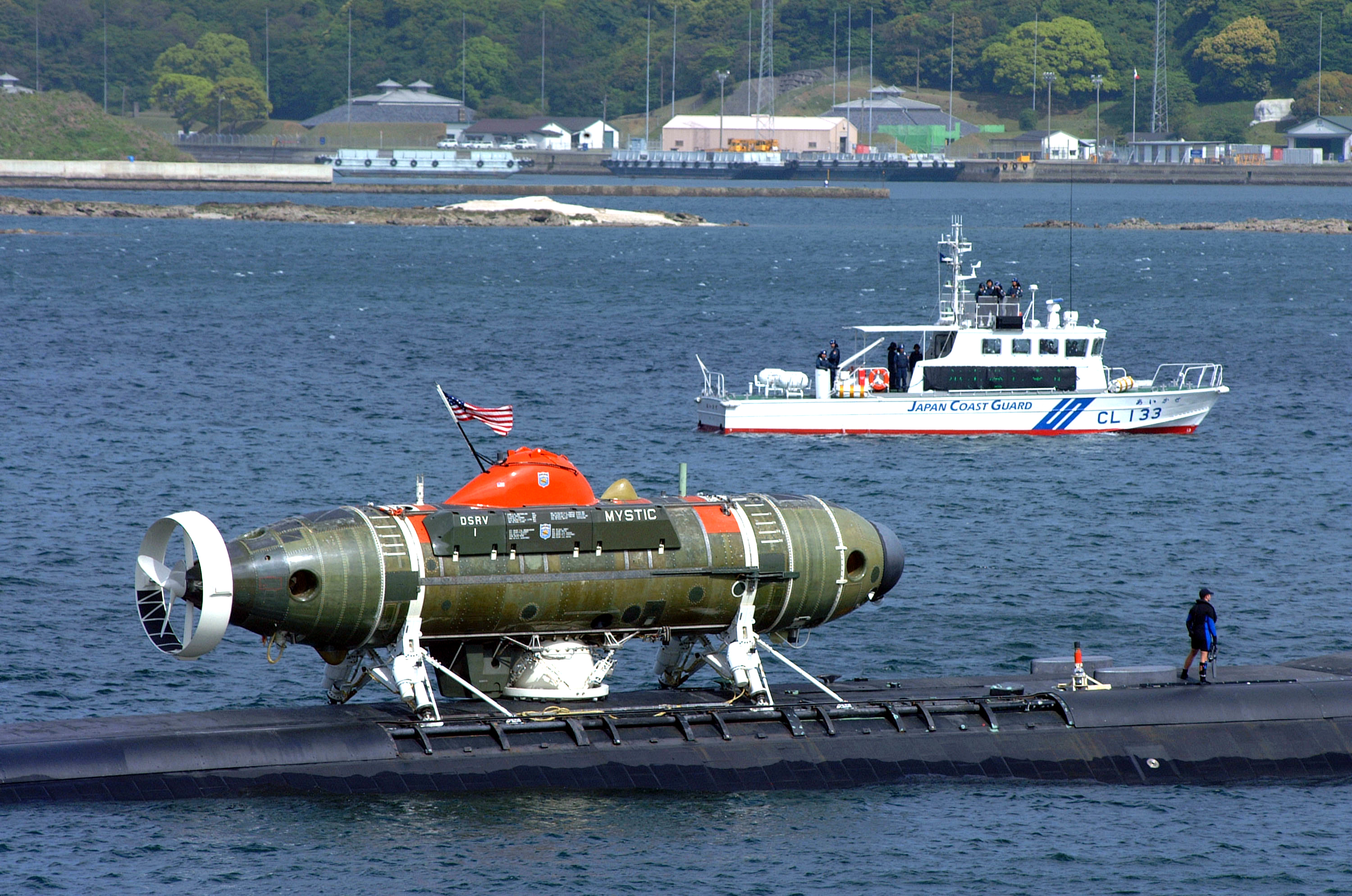
The US Navy's DSRV-1 Mystic docked to a Los Angeles-class attack submarine

A deep-submergence rescue vehicle (DSRV) is a type of deep-submergence vehicle used for rescue of personnel from disabled submarines and submersibles. While DSRV is the term most often used by the United States Navy, other nations have different designations for their equivalent vehicles.

== List of deep submergence rescue vehicles ==
=== Australia ===
ASRV Remora was the Australian navy's DSRV. It is based on a diving bell design.

=== China ===
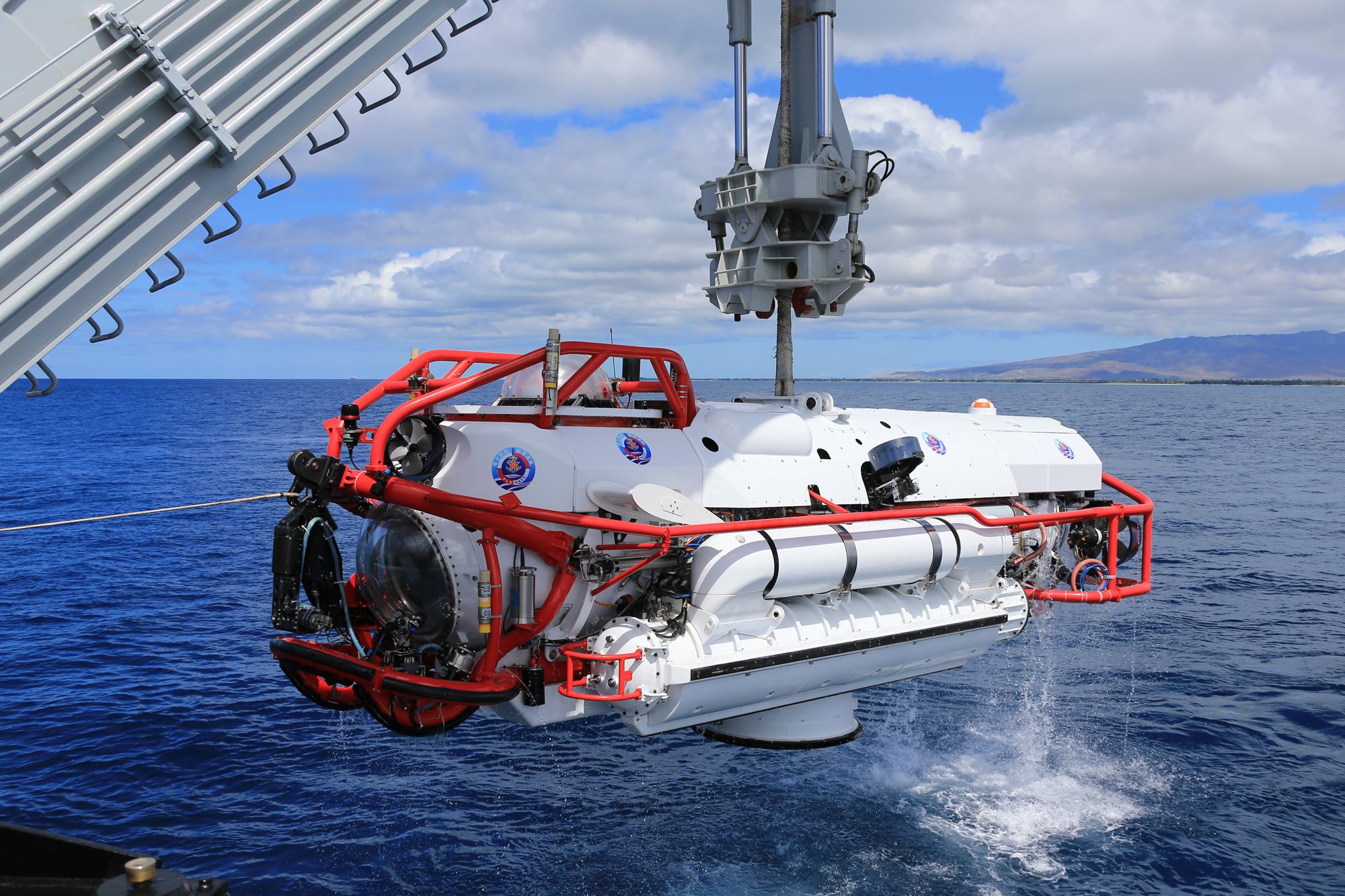
Forum Energy Technologies (FET) built LR-7 being retrieved by The Chinese navy submarine rescue ship Changdao

The People's Republic of China has three Type 925 Dajiang class and three Type 926 class. Each ship is equipped with either two Type 7103 DSRV or one LR7 crewed submersible undersea rescue vehicle.

=== Europe ===
France, Norway and the UK share the NATO Submarine Rescue System programme.

==== Italy ====
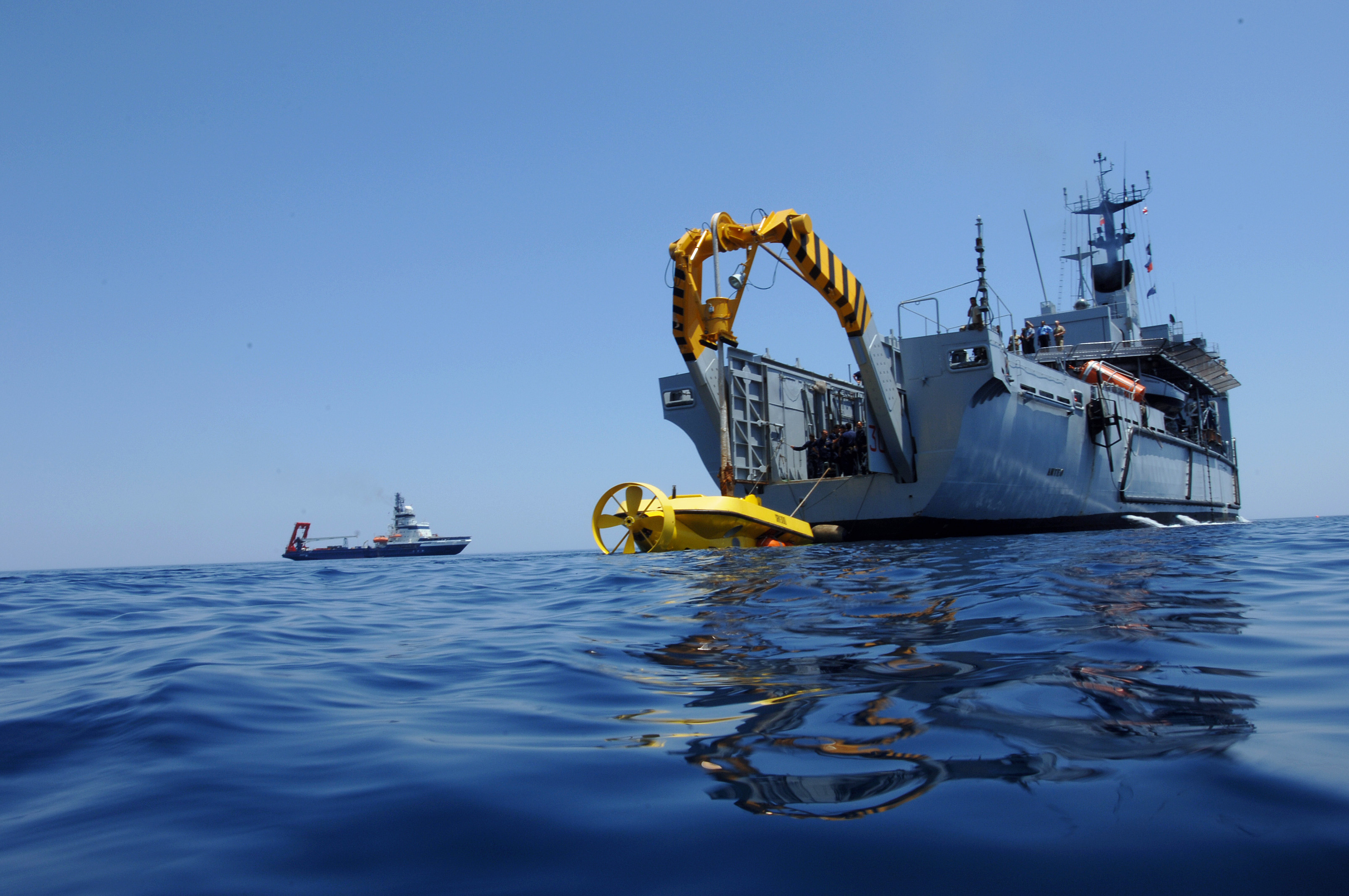
The Italian Navy rescue vehicle SRV-300 launched from the Italian salvage ship Anteo

Italy operates Anteo, equipped with the SRV-300 submersible in a submarine rescue role

- The SRV-300, built by Drass-Galeazzi, was delivered in 1999 and can operate up to 300 m (984 ft) depth, hosting 12 persons in the rescue compartment. The submarine, modified as deployable in 2010 (and maybe updated for operations up to 450 m, 1,476 ft depth), operates from the mother ship Anteo.
- SRV-300 replaced MSM-1S/USEL, which was built by Cantieri Navali Breda (Venezia), launched on 11 November 1978, 13.2 t displacement, fitting 10 persons in the rescue compartment.
- SRV-300 will be replaced by a new version under development, the DRASS Galeazzi SRV-650 with a maximum depth of 650 m (2,133 ft) and with a hosting capability of 15 persons in the rescue compartment, developed for operations from the new Italian future mother ship ARS / USSP .

==== Sweden ====
The Swedish Navy operates the submarine rescue ship HSwMS Belos which can carry the Swedish submarine rescue vessel URF (Swedish: Ubåtsräddningsfarkost) as well as the British LR5.

==== United Kingdom (NATO) ====
The United Kingdom operates the LR5 submersible in a submarine rescue role built by Forum Energy Technologies's Subsea Division. It previously operated the LR3 built by Slingsby Engineering, which became part of Forum Energy Technologies (FET).

=== India ===
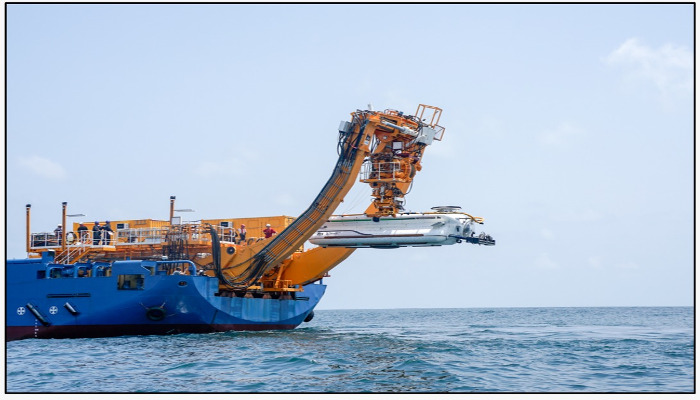
Indian Navy DSRV launched from a salvage ship

On 24 March 2016, United Kingdom's James Fisher Defence (JFD) won a contract, worth £193,000,000 (equivalent to £251,695,057 in 2025), to design, build and supply two of its third generation fly-away submarine rescue systems to the Indian Navy. The system includes the delivery of Deep Search and Rescue Vehicles (DSRV), Remote Operations Vehicle (ROV), Launch and Recovery Systems (LARS) equipment, Transfer Under Pressure (TUP) systems, and all logistics and support equipment required for their operations as well as 25-years maintenance support for the systems. The systems were to undergo factory acceptance testing before their delivery, commissioning and trials.

In December 2017, the factory acceptance tests of the first DSRV meant to be delivered to the Indian Navy were completed at JFD's National Hyperbaric Centre in Aberdeen. On 16 February 2018, JFD completed the first stage of harbour acceptance trials of the DSRV. The trials were conducted at Glasgow's King George V dock.

While the first system, referred to as Deep Submergence Rescue Vessel (DSRV) System, was delivered in April 2018 while the second system was to be delivered on 19 December 2018.

By November 2018, the first system underwent extensive trials. While the DSRV module dived to over 666 m (2,185 ft), the ROV and the Side Scan Sonar clocked a depth of 750 m (2,460 ft) and 650 m (2,130 ft), respectively. As reported in October, the DSRV also broke recorded the deepest submergence by a manned vessel" during the trials. On 15 October, the DSRV conducted mating with a submarine at a depth of 91 m (300 ft) to rescue mariners.

The first system was inducted officially on 12 December 2018 in the presence of the then Chief of the Naval Staff Admiral Sunil Lanba at the Naval Dockyard, Mumbai which serves as the headquarters of the Western Naval Command, making India one of the few nations to operate such capable systems. The second system would be based at Visakhapatnam which serves as the headquarters of the headquarters of Eastern Naval Command. The second unit was commissioned in 2019.

The system has the capability to rescue stranded mariners from depths of up to 650 m (2,130 ft) with a detection range of 1,000 m (3,300 ft) and an endurance of about 3 hours. The DSRV has a has a complement of 3 crew and 14 rescued personnel. It also is equipped with an advanced Side-Scan SONAR, Multifunctional Robotic Arms and advanced Cameras. They are Air-Transportable and launched from ships.

On 22 April 2021, the Navy mobilised its Visakhapatnam-based DSRV to assist the Indonesian Navy in search and rescue efforts for the Indonesian submarine KRI Nanggala which was reported missing.

In August 2025, the Indian Navy undertook the Rescue Seat Certification of SAS Manthatisi, a Heroine-class submarine. This follows the "rescue cooperation pact" signed between Indian Navy Chief Admiral Dinesh K Tripathi and South African Navy Chief Vice Admiral Monde Lobese on 3 September 2024 which allows India to deploy its Deep Submergence Rescue Vessel (DSRV) for assistance in case a South African Navy Submarine experiences an emergency. An Indian Navy team visited Simon's Town and held talks with multiple talks South African stakeholders before the certification.

These DSRVs will be deployed from the Nistar-class diving support vessels which are under construction. These will aid submarine operations of the Indian Navy.

- DSAR 1
- DSAR 2

=== Japan ===
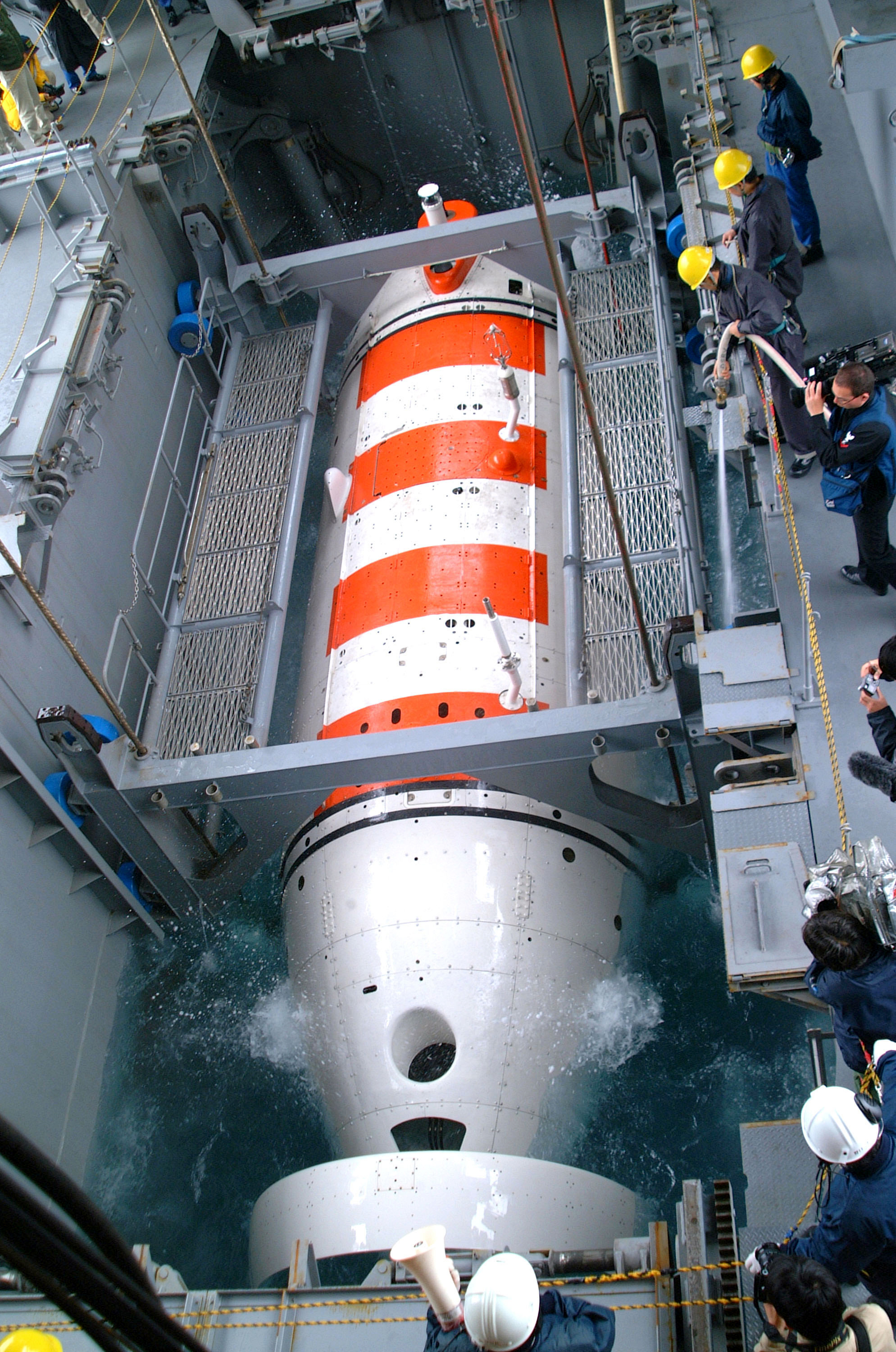
The JMSDF DSRV Angler Fish 2 aboard the submarine rescue ship JDS Chihaya

The Japan Maritime Self-Defense Force operate two DSRVs with dedicated mother ships.

- JS Chihaya – Chihaya (ちはや, ASR-403).
- JS Chiyoda (2016) – Chiyoda (ちよだ, ASR-404)

=== South Korea ===
The Korean navy operates a submarine rescue ship called Cheong Haejin. It has a dedicated mother ship. The model is based on a modified British design.

=== Russia ===
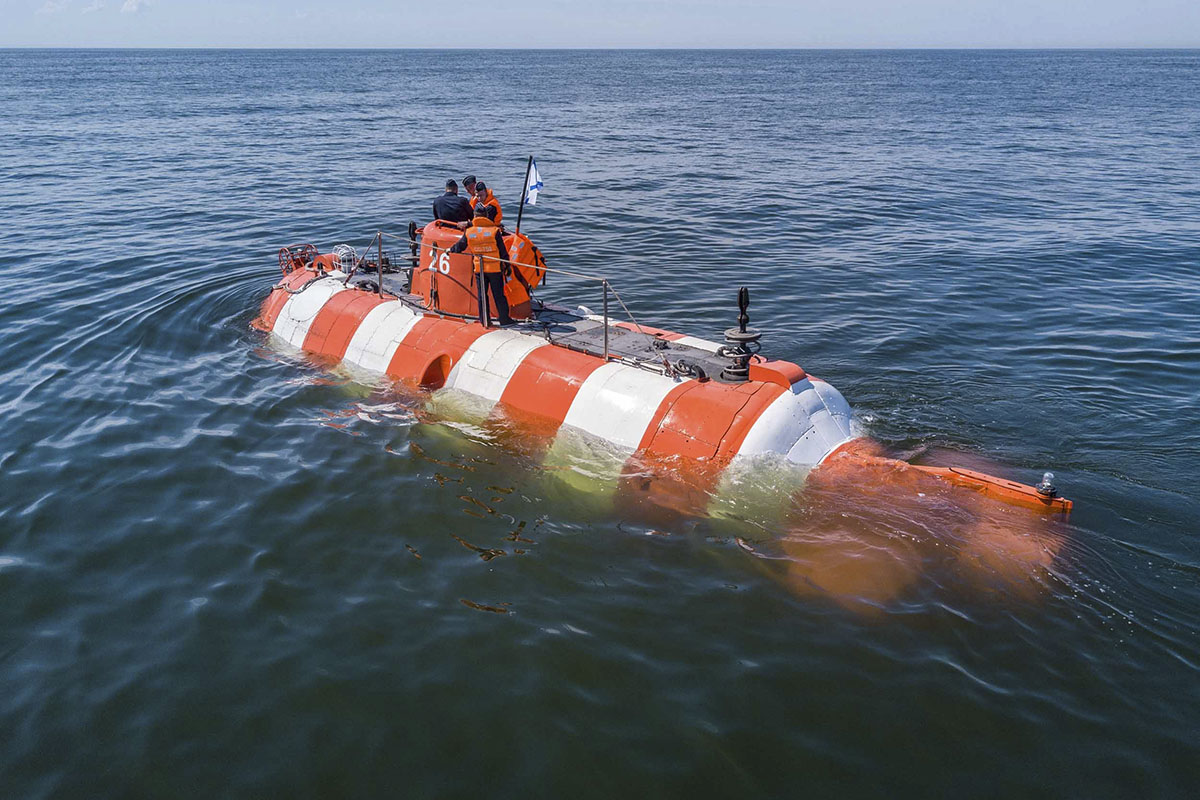
Priz-class AS-26 during a 2020 rescue exercise

Russia is believed to have one vessel of the Bester class and four of the Priz class, which was involved in the failed attempt to rescue the crew of Kursk.

- AS-28 (Priz class)
- AS-34 (Priz class)

=== Singapore ===
MV Swift Rescue, launched 29 November 2008, is Singapore's first and only submarine recovery vessel. It is equipped with a deep submergence rescue vehicle.

The vessel consisted of a Submarine Support and Rescue Vessel (SSRV), SSRV mother vessel proper and an integrated Submarine Rescue Vehicle (SRV), built by ST Marine at its Benoi Shipbuilding Yard in Singapore with its UK joint venture partner JFD based on its proprietary Deep Search and Rescue (DSAR) 500 Class submarine rescue vehicle platform. It also has an underwater drone ROV and a helipad.

The Republic of Singapore Navy has signed submarine rescue agreements with Australia, Indonesia, Malaysia, Vietnam, and United States to assist in submarine rescue efforts for their respective submarine fleets.

=== United States ===
The mode of deployment for these United States submersibles is: fly the vehicle to the port closest to the incident; attach the vehicle to a host submarine; the host submarine travels to the incident site; rescue. The DSRVs were originally designed to work with USS Pigeon and USS Ortolan, but those two vessels have since been decommissioned and replaced by the Submarine Rescue Diving Recompression System.

- DSRV-1 Mystic - Deactivation begun on 1 October 2008. Replaced with remotely operated tethered SRDRS.
- DSRV-2 Avalon - currently at the Central Coast Maritime Museum, Morro Bay, California

==== Operation ====
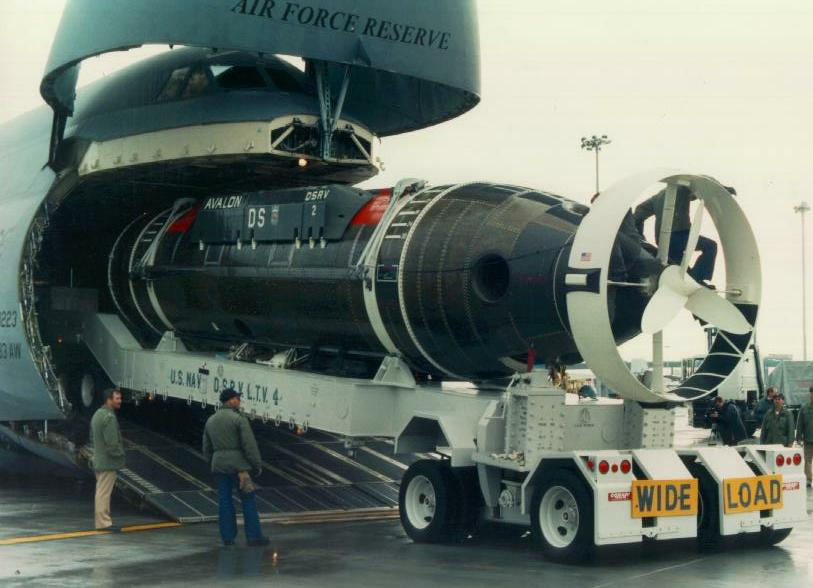
DSRV-2 Avalon being loaded onto a Lockheed C-5 Galaxy for transport

The Deep Submergence Rescue Vehicle (DSRV) is designed to rescue 24 people at a time at depths of up to 600 m (1,969 ft). Their maximum operating depth is 1,500 m (4,921 ft). Power is provided by two large batteries, one fore, and one aft that power the electrical, hydraulic and life support systems. The DSRV uses mercury in a completely sealed system to allow themselves to match any angle (up to 45°) in both pitch and roll so as to "mate" (attach) to a downed submarine that may be at an angle on the sea floor. The DSRV is capable of being transported by Air Force C-5 to anywhere in the world within 24 hours.

It is then loaded onto a "Mother Submarine" (MOSUB). The MOSUB then carries the DSRV to the rescue site where several trips are made to rescue all personnel. Rescue is usually accomplished by ferrying rescuees from the stranded sub to the MOSUB, however, they can also be taken to a properly equipped surface support ship.

In addition to a number of U.S. Navy submarines being outfitted for MOSUB capabilities, several NATO countries also have submarines outfitted to carry the U.S. Navy DSRV for rescue capability as needed. Both the UK and French navies have such submarines.

The interior of the DSRV is composed of three spheres. The forward sphere is the "Control Sphere" where the DSRV's pilot and copilot operate the vehicle. The two aft spheres (known as Mid Sphere and Aft Sphere) are used to seat the rescued individuals or to install equipment for additional operations. Maneuvering is accomplished using four thrusters and one main propeller.

== See also ==
- Escape trunk – Ambient pressure escape system for submarines
- Submarine rescue ship – Support ship for submarine rescue and deep-sea salvage operations
