= Submarine Rescue Diving Recompression System =

Remotely operated vehicle for rescue of personnel from sunken submarines

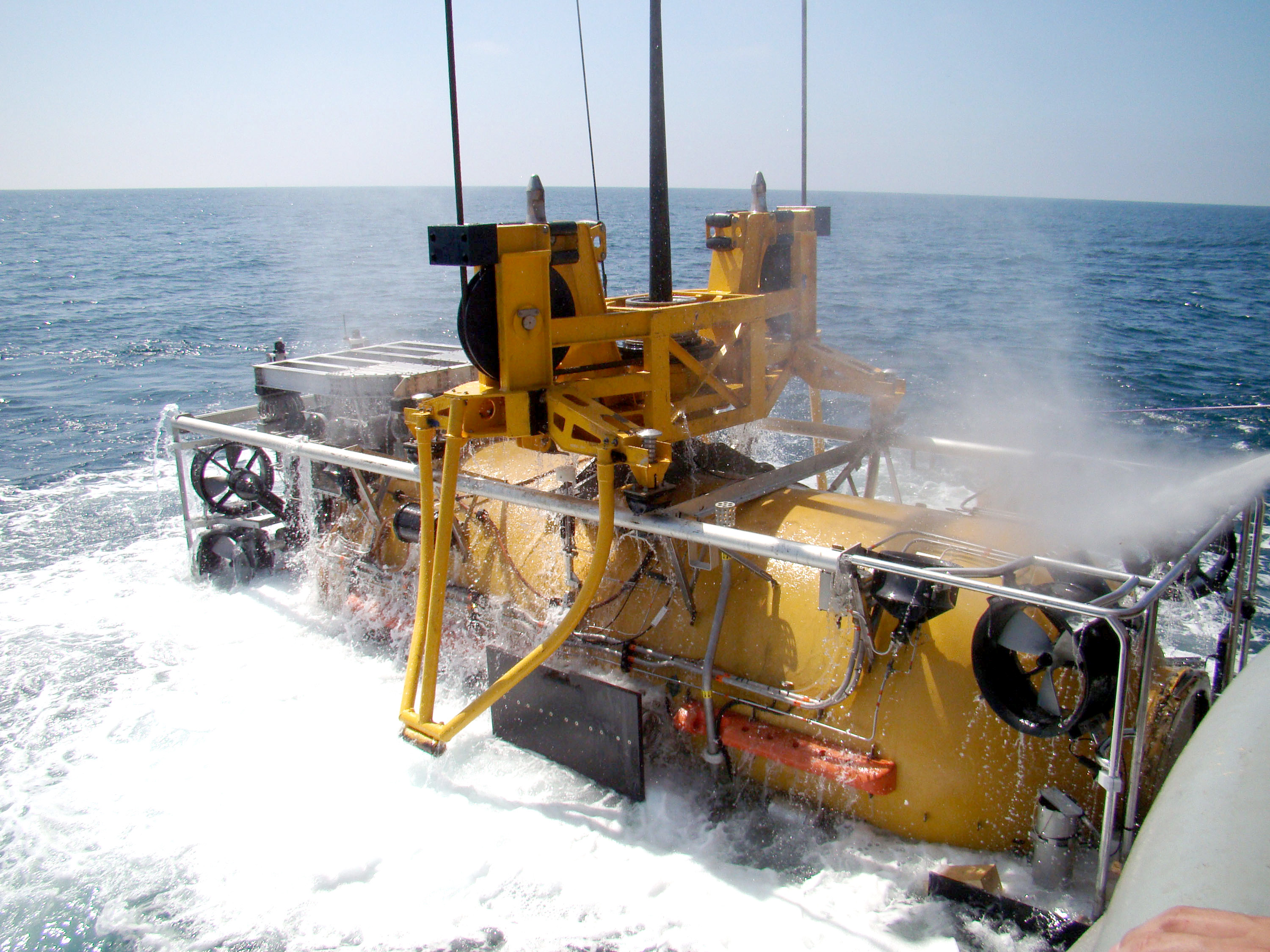
The pressurized rescue module (PRM) is recovered from the water after performing a submarine rescue exercise.

The Submarine Rescue Diving Recompression System (SRDRS) is a remotely operated underwater vehicle and its associated systems intended to replace the Mystic class deep submergence rescue vehicle as a means of rescuing United States Navy submarine crew members. Based on the Royal Australian Navy Submarine rescue vehicle Remora, the system is capable of rapidly deploying to a designated location, mounting to a vessel of opportunity, detecting and preparing the area around a downed submarine and submerging to depths of up to 2,000 feet (610 m) to retrieve members of its crew. The SRDRS then allows for the decompression of the crew.
