= Lockheed Missiles and Space Company =

Unit of the Lockheed Corporation

Lockheed Missiles and Space Company (LMSC) was a unit of the Lockheed Corporation "Missiles, Space, and Electronics Systems Group." LMSC was started by Willis Hawkins who served as its president. After Lockheed merged with Martin-Marietta the unit became known as "Lockheed Martin Missiles and Space". Located in Sunnyvale, California adjacent to Moffett Field, it operated a major satellite development and manufacturing plant.

Headquartered in Bethesda, Maryland, Lockheed Martin is an American global aerospace company that employs more than 110,000 people worldwide. The defense powerhouse focuses on the design, development, and manufacturing of advanced technological systems. Serving the U.S. and International customers, Lockheed Martin offers products and services in many sectors such as aeronautics, Missiles and Fire Control, Rotary and Mission Systems, Communications, and more.

Missiles and Fire Control

The Missiles and Fire control sector provides air and missile defense equipment. MFC's major programs include The Patriot Advanced capability (PAC-3) and Terminal High altitude area defense air, The Multiple Launch Rocket System, Special Ops and more. The MFC sector has contracts with multiple U.S. government classified programs.

Aeronautics

The Aeronautics sector focuses on researching, developing, and manufacturing advanced military aircraft. Aeronautics produces and provides support and sustainment services for the aircraft that they design and continue to upgrade them. Some of the most famous aircraft that they design would be the C-130J Hercules, the U.S. Air Force's F-22 fleet, and the Block 70F-16 for the Royal Bahraini Air Force.

Rotary and Mission Systems

Rotary and Mission Systems at Lockheed Martin involve surface ship and submarines combat systems, sea and land-based missile defense systems, radar systems, and military and commercial training systems. Previously known as Mission Systems and Training, this unit of Lockheed Martin was renamed Rotary and Missions systems in 2016, following the acquisition of Sikorsky (an American aircraft manufacturer). The Rotary and Mission Systems unit also oversees training and logistics within the company

Lockheed Martin in Orlando, Florida Lockheed Martin is one of Orlando's largest employers, contributing to the city's title "The Simulation Capital of the World." Recently, the company won a 92 million dollar contract to produce electronic consolidated automated support systems with the United States Navy. The work will take place at Lockheed Martin's Orlando-based facility with an anticipated completion date sometime in 2022

The largest technology company in Orlando employs 8,000 locals and has announced that they would like to grow their business and obtain 9,000 employees by 2023. As the company grows, it can develop and manufacture even more advanced technological products. The Orlando facilities employ people in a number of different fields such as engineering, Information Technology, Communications, Finance, Sales and Marketing, Contract Negotiation, Assembly and many others.

== See also ==
- Corona (satellite)
- Onizuka Air Force Station
