= NATO Submarine Rescue System =

Project to develop an international submarine rescue system

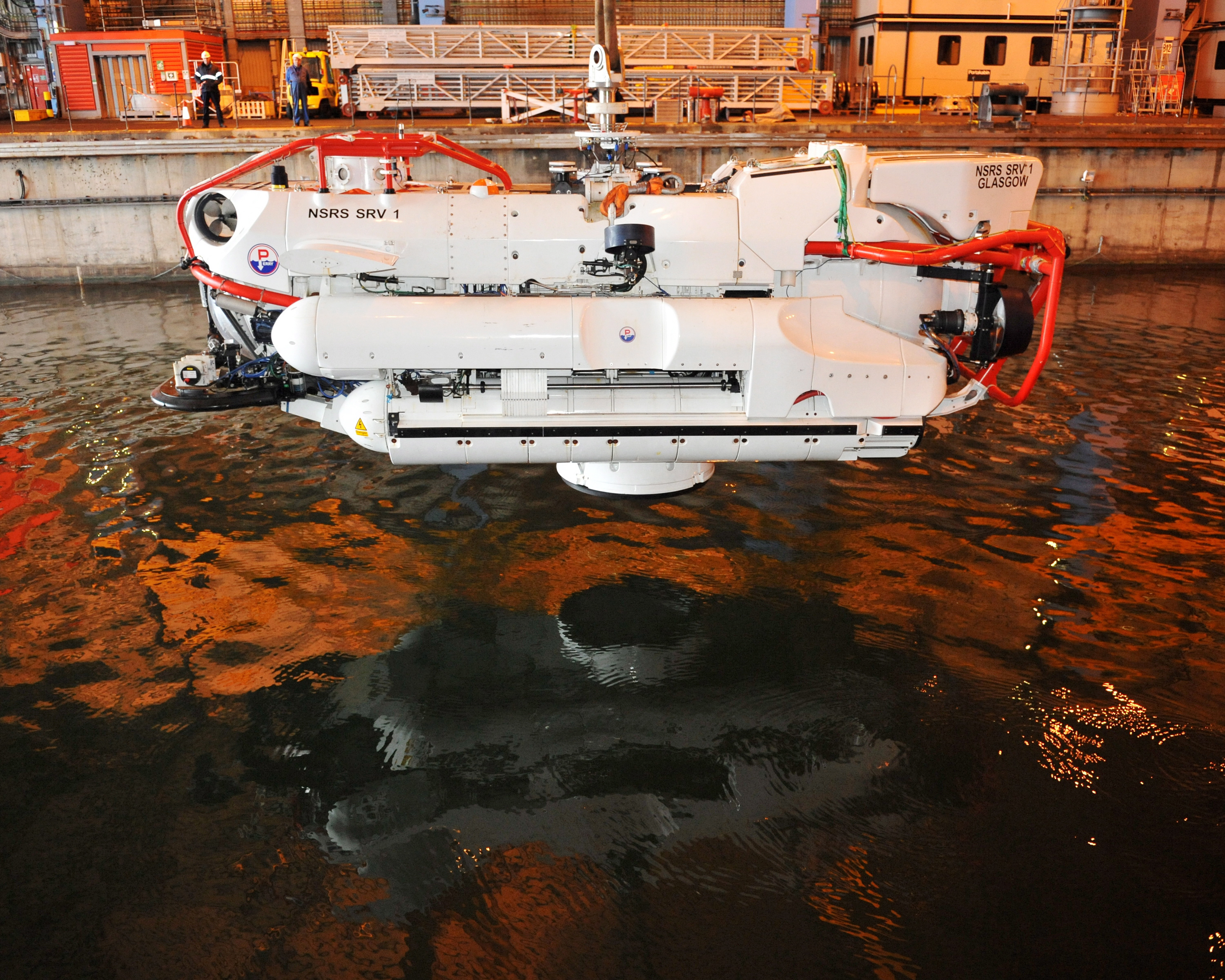
NSRS in 2011.

The NATO Submarine Rescue System (NSRS) is a tri-national project to develop an international submarine rescue system. The system provides a rescue capability primarily to the partner nations of France, Norway and the United Kingdom, but also to NATO and allied nations and to any submarine equipped with a suitable mating surface around its hatches.

== History ==
NSRS was designed and manufactured by Forum Energy Technologies' Subsea Division, formerly Perry Slingsby Systems.

The NSRS entered service in 2008, replacing the UK's previous rescue system, the LR5. The complete system is fully air transportable in a variety of aircraft operated by NATO countries, including the Airbus A400M Atlas, Boeing C-17 Globemaster III, and Lockheed C-5 Galaxy. It is capable of launch and recovery in a significant wave height of up to 5 metres (16 ft) (sea state 6) and can reach any distressed submarine (DISSUB) in 72-96 hours from the alert, dependent upon location. It has limited capability in ice-covered seas.

== Rescue procedure ==
When a 'SUBSUNK' alert, which messages that a submarine is in difficulties is received, the operator of the submarine will initiate the NSRS call-out procedure. The intervention system, which is upon a ready-made remotely operated vehicle (ROV) will dispatch to the location approximately 24 hours in advance of the full rescue system. Once the ROV arrives it will locate the distressed submarine, establish communications, conduct damage assessment, and prepare the submarine for rescue operations.

The Submarine Rescue Vehicle (SRV) along with a portable launch and recovery system (PLARS), support and operating equipment and the hyperbaric treatment complex (known as the Transfer Under Pressure (TUP) equipment) will arrive approximately 24 hours later. All equipment and personnel will be flown to the mobilisation port for embarkation on a suitable mobilisation ship. The embarkation will take less than 18 hours and the mobilisation ship will then sail to the scene where the SRV will be launched. The aim is to achieve time-to-first-rescue of 72 hours, with personnel being brought to the surface in groups of 12, and transferring them to the NSRS hyperbaric treatment facility if necessary.

The NSRS is based at HM Naval Base Clyde in the UK.

== Intervention System and the Intervention Remotely Operated Vehicle (IROV) ==
The Intervention system comprises the ROV, the launch and recovery system and the control module. The vehicle is based on the Forum Energy Technologies (FET) PSSL Triton SP ROV which is in widespread commercial use and is fitted with variable vectored thrusting. It is capable of operating in depths of 1000m. It can carry a variety of tools to assist in removing debris and delivering emergency life support stores (ELSS) to the survivors through the escape/rescue hatch, in watertight pods, known as pod-posting.

== Submarine Rescue Vehicle (SRV) ==
The SRV is a crewed submersible and was developed from previous rescue vehicles, notably LR5, developed and built by FET's Subsea Division brand Perry Slingsby Systems Ltd in North Yorkshire. It is 10m long, weighs 30 tonnes and has an all-steel (NQ1), single piece hull. The craft is operated by a three-man crew (two pilots and a rescue chamber operator). It can operate at depths down to 610m and can mate with the rescue hatch seal at angles of up to 60 degrees in any direction. It also uses high-temperature batteries, of "Zebra" type. These enable it to stay submerged for up to 96 hours. Propulsion is provided by two 25kW units, with a further four smaller units being used for positioning. It is the latest generation of rescue vehicle and has diverless recovery, fibre-optic data communications and a self-contained breathing system developed by Divex (now part of James Fisher Defence).

Delivery of the complete system was achieved by October 2007. Trials and development of improved operating practices were completed in time for Exercise Bold Monarch in May 2008. Full operational capability was attained in March 2011. NSRS has operated from numerous mother ships and exercised to bottomed diesel submarines of NATO nations as well as those of Russia and Sweden. In 2013 NSRS achieved a first by conducting a full rescue cycle with the nuclear attack submarine HMS Astute, which was suspended mid-water below large mooring buoys. This success was repeated in April 2015 in the Mediterranean Sea to the French nuclear submarine Rubis.

== Portable Launch and Recovery System (PLARS) ==
The PLARS comprises a combined SRV catcher and stabilisation system and is designed for operation in high sea states (up to sea state 6). The system is air transportable in C-130 Hercules and the A400M. It uses a constant tension winch system for maintaining hawse tension in a wide range of sea states.

== Transfer Under Pressure (TUP) System ==
The TUP system is a fully autonomous and air transportable hyperbaric treatment facility that provides full decompression and medical support for up to 72 personnel simultaneously from 6 bar to ambient pressure. It comprises a reception chamber, two decompression chambers and a central control position with full life-support and environmental control in conditions from −30 °C (−22 °F) to 60 °C (140 °F).

Built and put into service by Rolls-Royce Holdings, the NSRS will be transferred to James Fisher Defence in July 2015.

== See also ==
- NoCGV Harstad – Offshore patrol vessel of the Norwegian Coast Guard, equipped with NSRS
- LR5 Submarine Rescue System – Crewed submersible for submarine rescue
- Submarine Parachute Assistance Group – Royal Navy rescue support team
