= LR5 =

Crewed submersible for submarine rescue

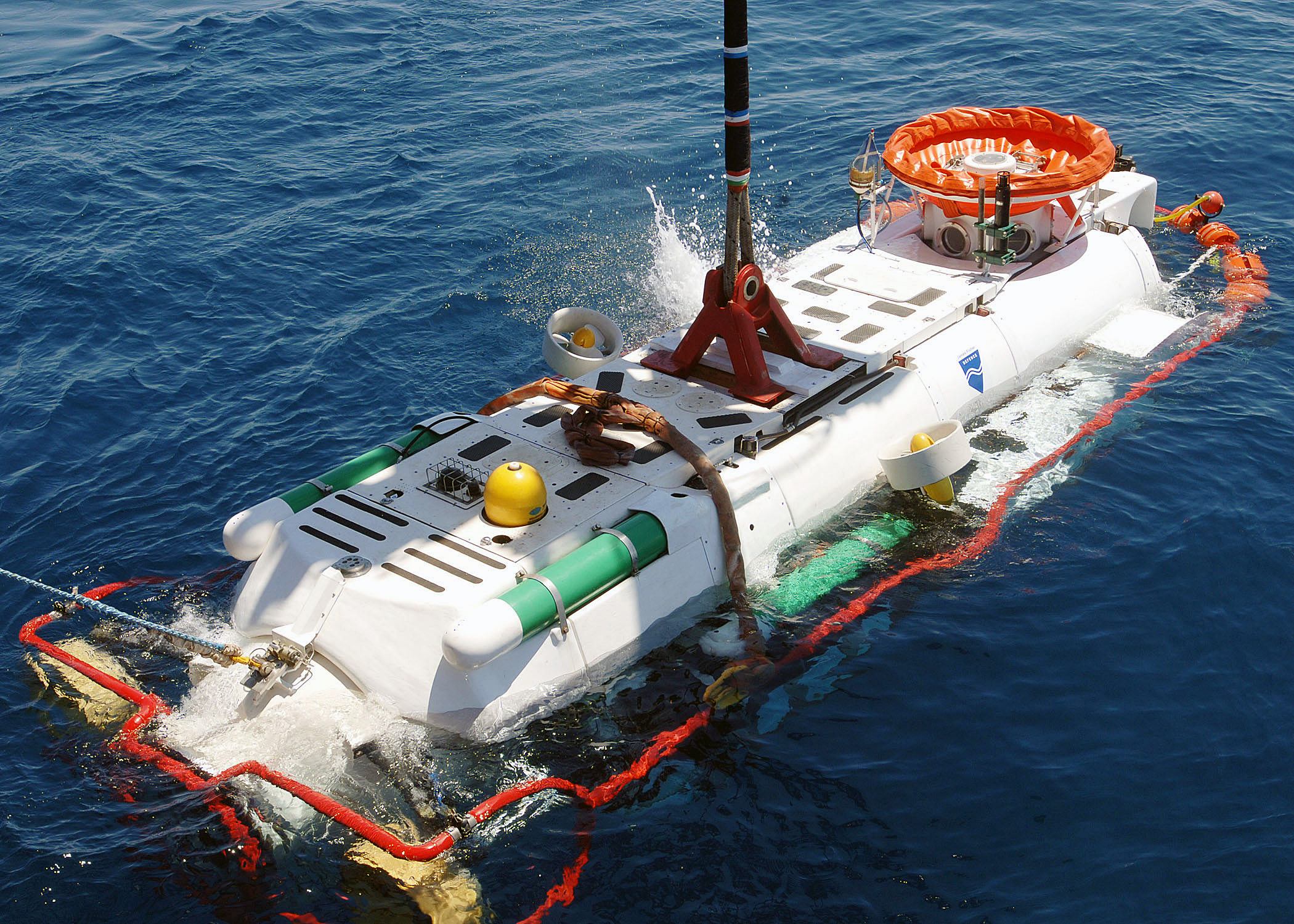
- The rescue vehicle LR5 being lowered into the water by a crane from the Finnish icebreaker Fennica

History

Australia
- Name: LR5
- Owner: Royal Navy
- Operator: Royal Australian Navy (leased)
- Builder: Forum Energy Technologies
- Acquired: June 2009
- Status: in active service, as of 2018

General characteristics
- Class & type: DSAR-class submarine rescue vehicle
- Tonnage: 24 t (24 long tons) (in air weight)
- Length: 9.6 m (31 ft 6 in)
- Beam: 3.2 m (10 ft 6 in)
- Depth: 2.7 m (8 ft 10 in)
- Propulsion: 2 × 10 kW (13 hp) electric motors
- Speed: 3 knots (5.6 km/h; 3.5 mph)
- Endurance: 10 hours
- Test depth: 650 m (2,130 ft)
- Capacity: 1,200 kg (2,600 lb) (16 persons)
- Crew: 2

LR5 is a crewed submersible which was used by the British Royal Navy until 2009 when it was leased to support the Royal Australian Navy. It is designed for retrieving sailors from stranded submarines and is capable of rescuing 16 at a time. The Royal Navy now has the use of the NATO Submarine Rescue System.

== Use ==
Only two crew members are needed for the use of LR5 but in normal conditions, usually three crew members are used — the pilot, the co-pilot, and the system operator. For the operating conditions, the LR5 is able to operate in seastate conditions of 5 m maximum and its safe operating depth is limited to 500 m. Eight trips can be done with the LR5 before battery recharge is needed, which makes the LR5 able to save 120 sailors on one full charge of eight trips. The LR5 is fitted with an integrated navigation and tracking outfit. This system, developed by Kongsberg Simrad, integrates the surface and subsea navigation data.

== History ==
The LR5 was used by the Royal Navy from 1978 to 2009. Originally Manufactured by Vickers Slingsby, which became Slingsby Engineering, then Perry Slingsby Systems and is now Forum Energy Technologies (FET).

In the late 1990s and early 2000s, the British Defense Ministry contracted with Global Crossing, a company with a marine underwater cable business, to maintain and operate the LR5. Global Crossing used the submersible in their cable business and was also required to keep it ready to respond to emergencies.

Britain activated this agreement to help in the unsuccessful rescue of the crew of the Russian nuclear submarine Kursk. Global Crossing flew the LR5, and support vessels and crew, to the rescue site. However, they were unable to make a rescue attempt, as the Russian Navy refused all offers of international assistance.

Since June 2009, it has been used by the Royal Australian Navy.

== See also ==
- Scorpio ROV – Work class remotely operated underwater vehicle
- Deep-submergence rescue vehicle – Submersible used for rescue of people from disabled submarines and submersibles
