= Submarine rescue =

Rescue of personnel from a disabled submarine

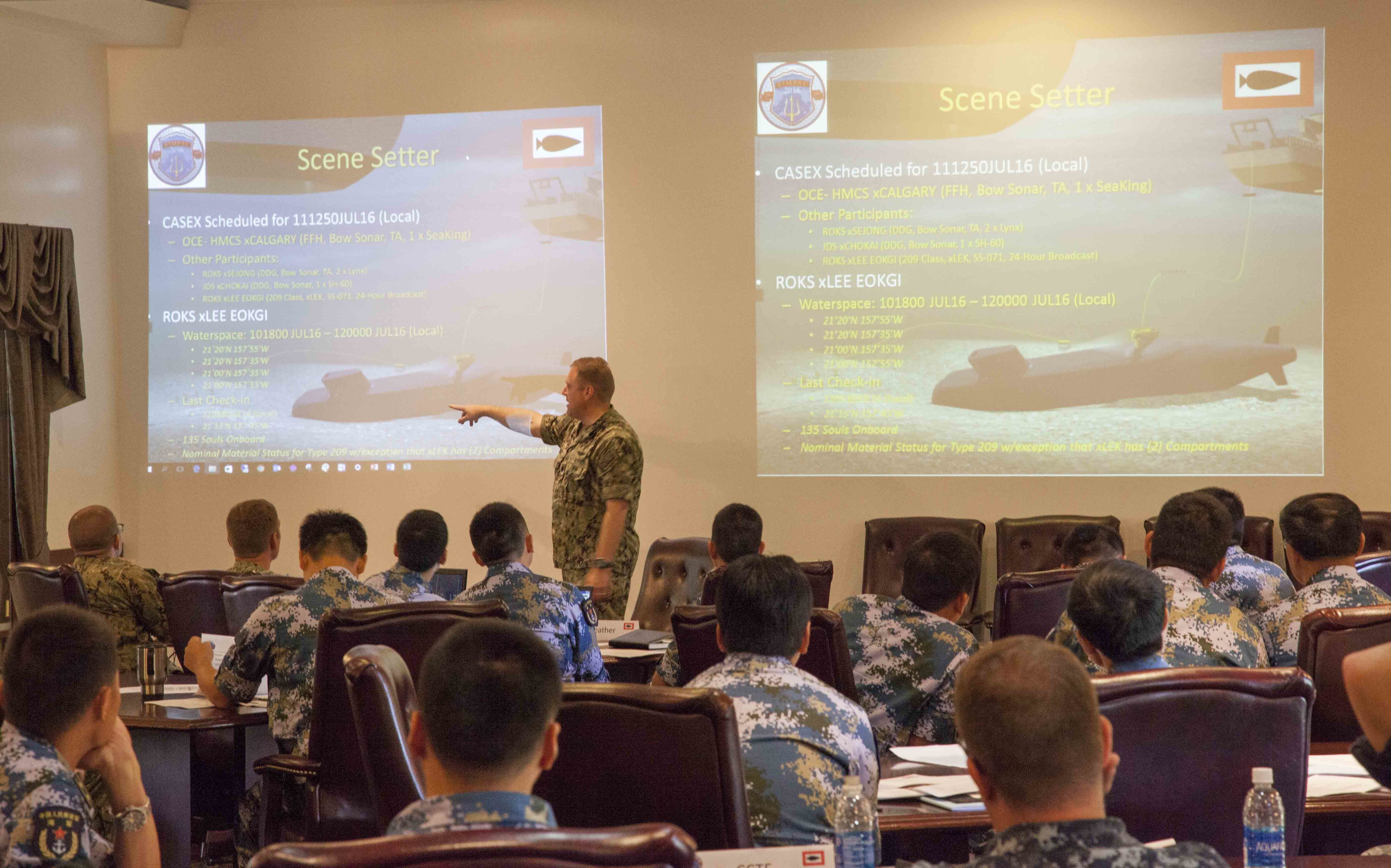
RIMPAC Submarine Rescue Tabletop Exercise

Submarine rescue is the process of locating a sunk submarine with survivors on board, and bringing the survivors to safety. This may be done by recovering the vessel to the surface first, or by transferring the trapped personnel to a rescue bell or deep-submergence rescue vehicle to bring them to the surface. Submarine rescue may be done at pressures between ambient at depth, and sea level atmospheric pressure, depending on the condition of the distressed vessel and the equipment used for the rescue. Self-rescue of submarine personnel by buoyant free ascent at ambient pressure is considered submarine escape. Survivors may require recompression treatment for decompression illness.

National and international services exist to facilitate the rapid response to submarine emergencies, including the NATO Submarine Rescue System, and within the US navy the Undersea Rescue Command (URC).

== History ==
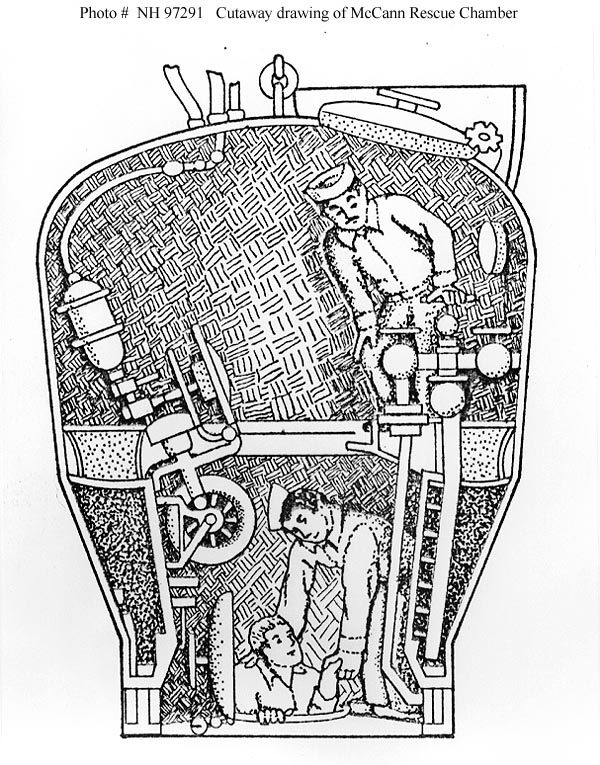
Cutaway drawing of the McCann Rescue Chamber.

The original strategy for surviving a submarine accident was to escape. The first escape systems were based on a mining breathing apparatus, which was a primitive form of rebreather using a soda-lime scrubber. The system used in the first escape from a sunk submarine was the German Dräger breathing apparatus, used when the submarine U3 sank in 1911. Similar systems, such as the Royal Navy's Davis Submerged Escape Apparatus, and the United States Navy's Momsen lung, were adopted soon after. In 1946 an investigation by the RN found that there was no difference in survival rate between using an escape apparatus and an unaided ascent, so the free ascent was officially adopted. Free ascent required the submariner to keep an open airway throughout the ascent to avoid lung overpressure injury due to air expansion with decreasing ambient pressure.

The USN adopted the Steinke hood in 1962, which is a hood with a transparent viewport attached to a life jacket, which allowed the user to rebreathe air trapped in the hood during the ascent. Free ascent and the Steinke hood were simple, but provided no environmental protection once the submariner surfaced, and many submariners in the HMS Truculent and Komsomolets incidents died at the ocean's surface due to hypothermia, heart failure, or drowning. During the 1990s most of the world’s navies using submarines replaced their escape systems with the British Submarine Escape Immersion Equipment, or a variation. The SEIE is rated for escape from 185m, covers the user completely, and provides thermal protection and integral flotation that can be linked to other units on the surface.

Some rescues involving recovering the whole submarine to the surface were made, but this required ideal conditions, and more often failed. The successful USS Squalus rescue using the McCann Rescue Chamber in 1939 showed that deep rescue is possible, and provided a redirection in survival strategy thinking.

Built-in escape pods have been investigated by the Russian Navy, and were considered by the US Navy before they decided on a system of deep submergence rescue vehicles which entered service during the 1970s. These were small crewed submarines which could be carried by another submarine, and deployed underwater, making them largely unaffected by surface weather conditions. The first models for the USN could carry 24 survivors. and could be airlifted to a port near to the disabled submarine and mounted on a compatible submarine vessel of opportunity.

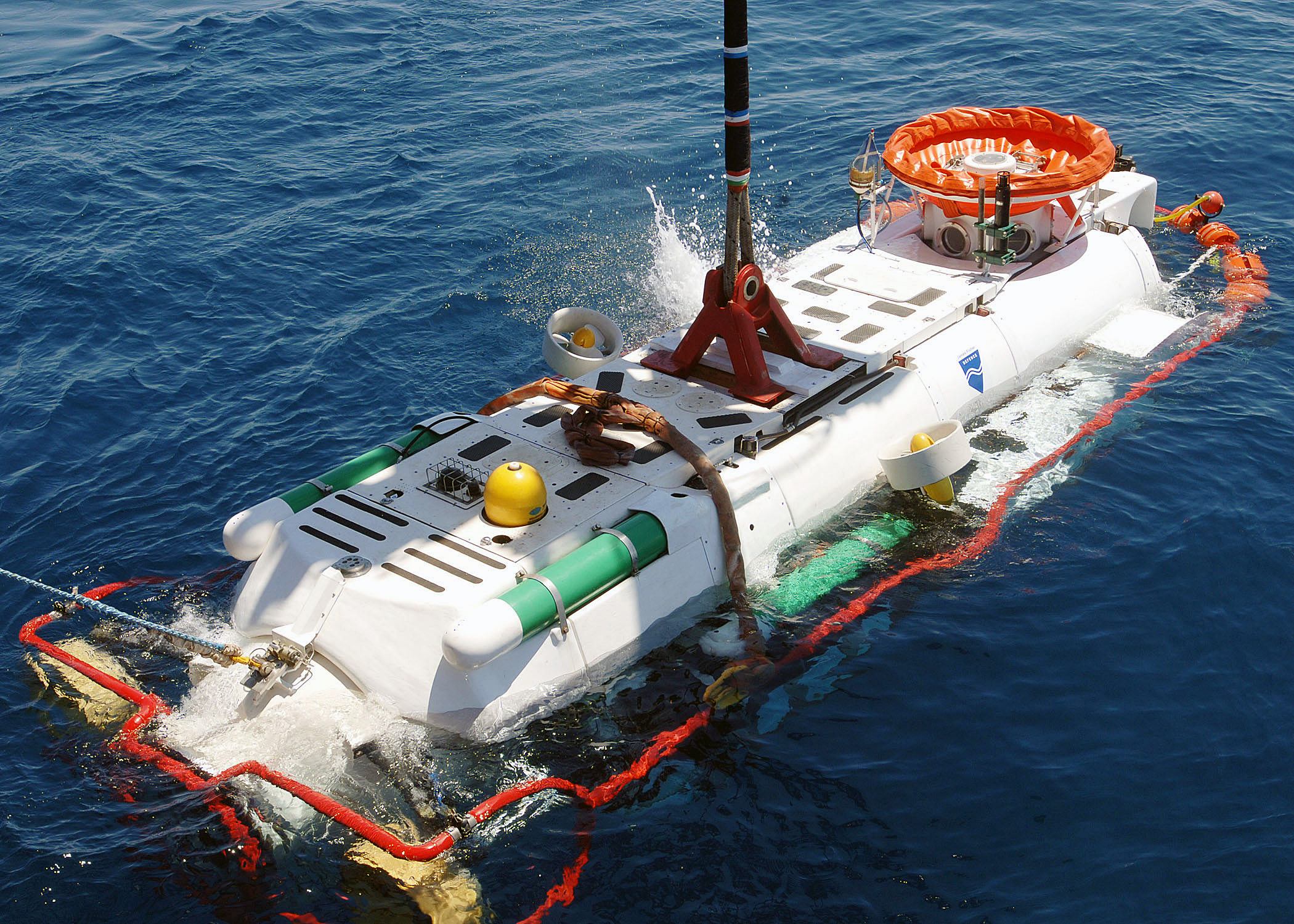
LR5 rescue vehicle is lowered into the water

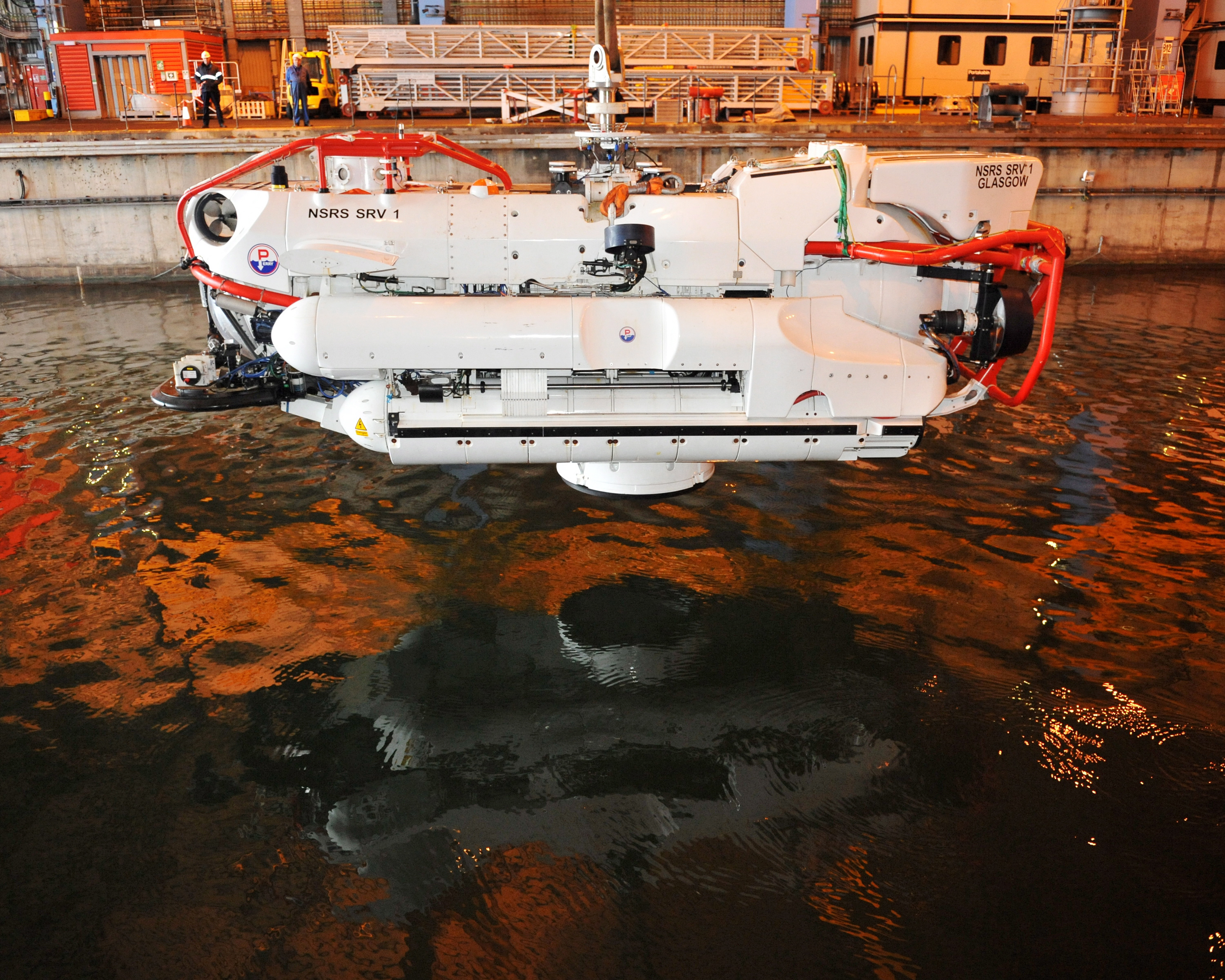
NSRS in 2011.

Other navies followed this example and developed their own portable rescue capabilities. The Royal Navy’s LR5 Submarine Rescue Vehicle uses a surface vessel of opportunity as the base of operations, and operates in conjunction with the Submarine Parachute Assistance Group and the Scorpio ROV. The SPAG team are set up to parachute into the water at the location of the incident along with air-dropped equipment pods containing rigid-hulled inflatable boats, life rafts, food, water and medical supplies to support survivors evacuating the sunken submarine.

The LR5 and DSRV were due to be replaced the end of 2008. The USN developing the Submarine Rescue Diving Recompression System and the LR5 replaced by the similar NATO Submarine Rescue System, a joint project of Britain, France and Norway. These systems are similar in concept to the Royal Australian Navy's Australian Submarine Rescue Vehicle Remora, and carry out rescue operations in three phases: reconnaissance and possibly site preparation or delivery of emergency supplies by ROV, rescue by deep-submergence rescue vehicle, and crew decompression when needed after transfer under pressure to a surface decompression chamber. There is a trend towards larger capacity rescue vehicles, which will reduce the number of locking on operations and recoveries from the water necessary.

After the Kursk submarine disaster of 2000, the International Submarine Escape and Rescue Liaison Office (ISMERLO) was formed in 2003 to help coordinate international submarine rescue operations.

During the 2023 Titan incident, discussions surrounding the possible salvaging of the submersible were raised by maritime entities; officials forwarded proposals for the transportation of the DSV Limiting Factor towards the last known location before diving down in search and discovery attempts, an approach that would have costed millions. Some however disputed the suggestion, since the time quantity for the Limiting Factor to arrive, transportation logistics of the submersible to the location along with the length to rescue as well as recover Titan led some to doubt its overall feasibility. Others recommended the consideration of the remaining oxygen on board the Titan. Despite the efforts to locate and rescue the Titan, it was later discovered to have imploded, killing all five occupants.

=== Timeline of successful submarine rescues ===
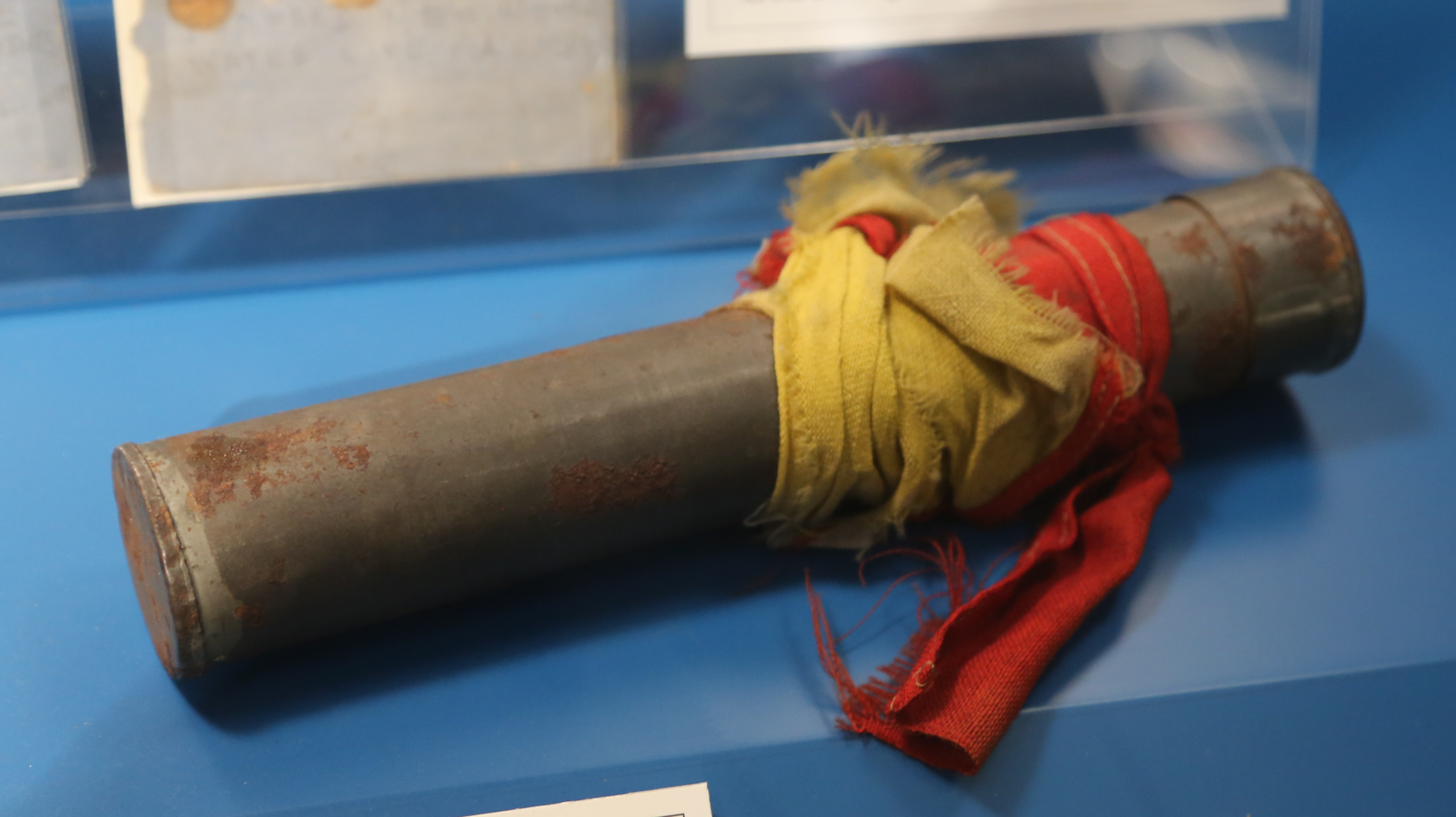
- Mayday capsules sent from HMS K13 when it sank on 29 January 1917
  1917: On 29 January 1917, the submarine HMS K13 sank in the Gareloch in Argyll and Bute, Scotland, during sea trials with 80 people on board. About 10 hours later a vessel deployed divers who were able to communicate with the survivors. Later an airline was attached to the vessel and the ballast tanks were blown. By midday on the 31st the bows were hauled to the surface and supported by a pair of barges while a hole was cut to let the 48 survivors out.
- 1939: On 23 May the Sargo-class submarine USS Squalus sank in 240 feet (73 m) during trials at Portsmouth, New Hampshire. The sister ship USS Sculpin, which was also on site, located the disabled submarine and established that there were survivors. The McCann Rescue Chamber was used to successfully rescue thirty-three survivors from Squalus. At the time of the Squalus accident, Lieutenant Commander Momsen was serving as head of the Experimental Diving Unit at the Washington Navy Yard. The submarine rescue ship USS Falcon (ASR-2), commanded by Lieutenant George A. Sharp, was on site within twenty-four hours. It lowered the Rescue Chamber — a revised version of a diving bell invented by Momsen — and in four dives over the next 13 hours recovered all 33 survivors in the first deep submarine rescue ever. McCann was in charge of Chamber operations, with Momsen commanding the divers. The submarine was eventually raised and renamed USS Sailfish.
- 1973: Pisces III, a Canadian deep-sea submersible, was trapped on the seabed at nearly 1,600 feet (490 m) in the Irish Sea on 27 August with a crew of two during a dive to lay telecommunications cable after losing buoyancy and sinking. Two similar submersibles and a remotely operated underwater vehicle eventually found the Pisces III and connected two cables which were then used to lift it back to the surface. Both crew survived.
- 2005: On 7 August 2005, the Russian Priz-class AS-28 mini-submarine was rescued from Beryozovaya Bay off the Kamchatka Peninsula after being trapped at a depth of 190 meters for a duration of over 3 days. The sub got stuck on 4 August at a depth of 190m, in cables of the Russian coastal monitoring system. The Russian navy first tried to lift the submarine and then drag it to shallower water where it could be reached by divers, but the cables which had fouled the propellers prevented this from working. On 7 August the British Scorpio-45 ROV arrived and managed to cut AS-28 loose. All seven people on board AS-28, survived.

== Methods ==
Several methods have been used to rescue submariners from a disabled submarine lying on the bottom. Some of the methods involve a submarine rescue ship, a surface support ship for submarine rescue and deep-sea salvage operations. Methods employed include raising the submarine, a rescue in situ using the McCann Rescue Chamber, deep-submergence rescue vehicles (DSRV's) and diving operations.

Emergency position-indicating radiobeacon (EPIRB) is a device used by submarines to signal distress and broadcast their location to rescuers. EPIRBs are typically designed to deploy automatically if the submarine reaches a certain depth, helping rescuers locate the vessel quickly, even if it’s submerged.

The US Navy defines their rescue mission sequence to involve identifying a 'Vessel of Opportunity'; being a vessel capable of transporting a rescue system, and transporting the rescue system to the vessel via aircraft before dispatching the vessel to the location of the distressed submarine.

=== Escape Immersion Equipment ===
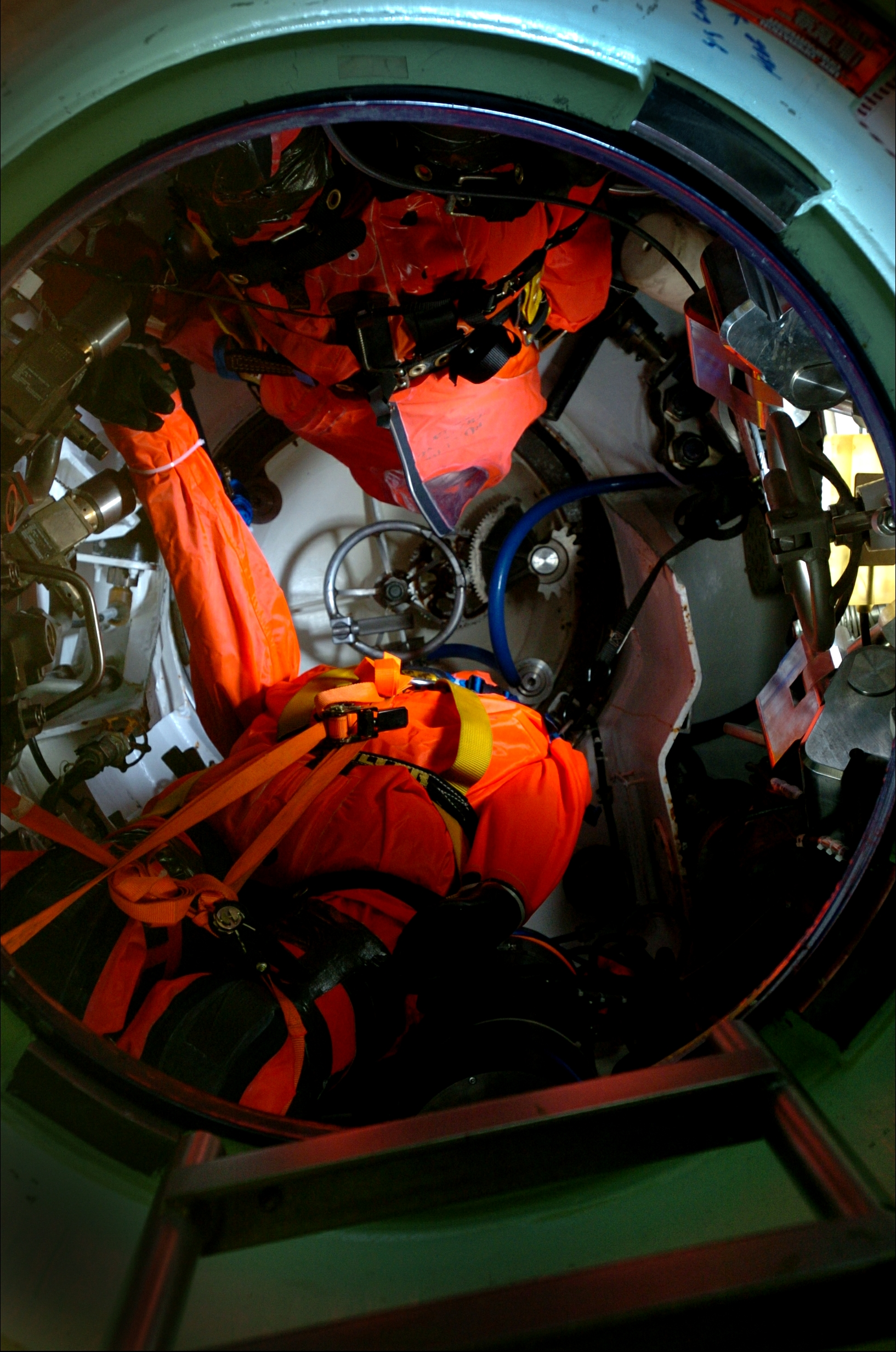
Submarine escape trunk containing Escape Immersion Equipment (orange suits)

Submarine Escape Immersion Equipment (SEIE) allows individual escape from a distressed submarine. It is a waterproof, insulated suit with a breathing system and buoyancy control to safely bring crew to the surface, protecting against cold and decompression risks.

=== Refloating the vessel ===
A conceptually obvious way to rescue the submariners is to recover the whole submarine to the surface, at which point the survivors can either leave through a hatch, or a hole can be cut in the hull to allow egress. In practice this is not often feasible, as it depends on availability of suitable equipment, good weather, and moderate depth.

Refloating Submarines has been done in salvage operations, and strategic missions such as Project Azorian where a Soviet Submarine was lifted to the surface by the Glomar Explorer.

Typically however, when the goal is to rescue the sailors onboard, salvaging the entire submarine is considered a secondary priority, with quicker and easier methods of rescuing the crew taking precedence.

=== Rescue chamber ===
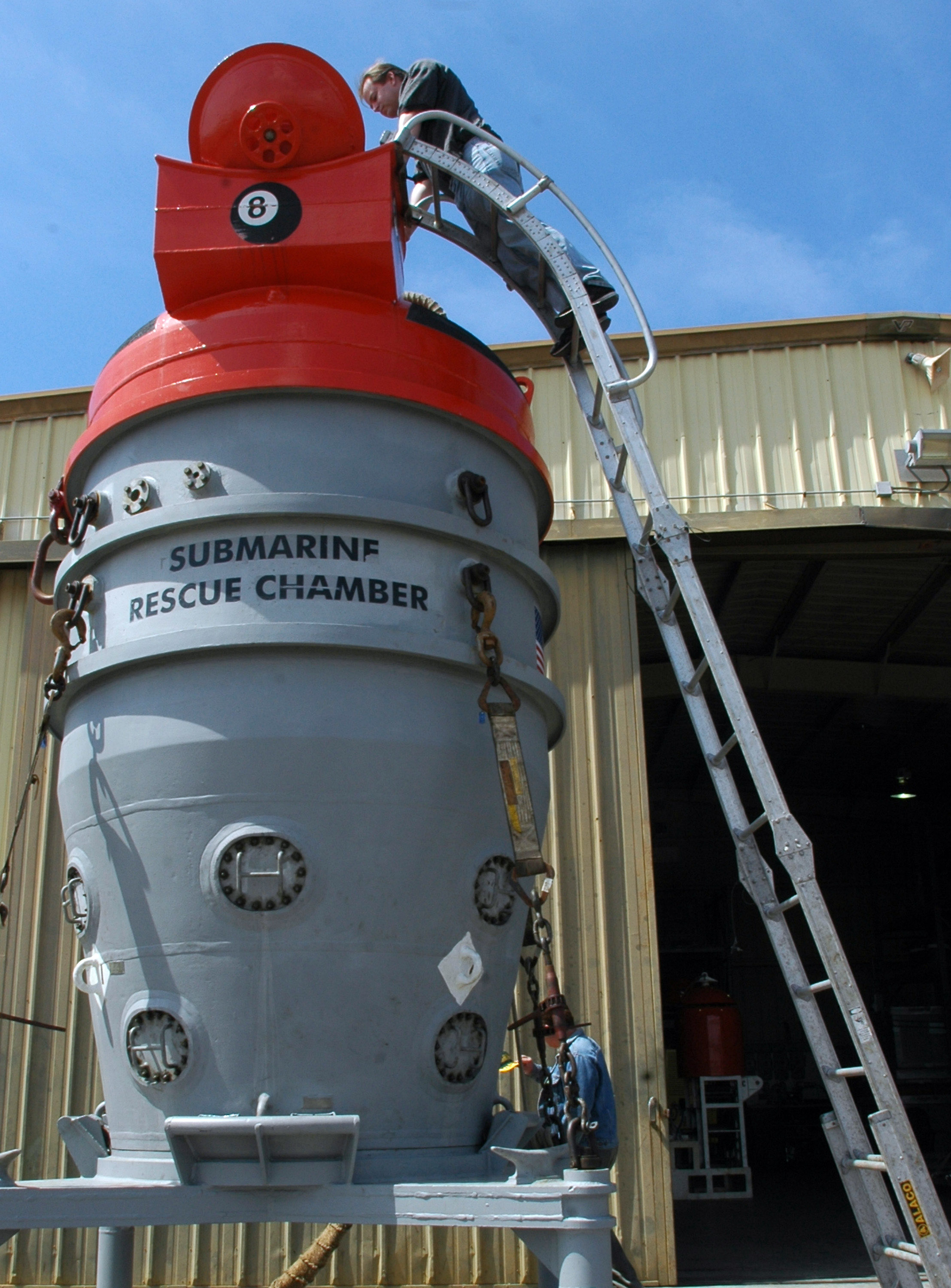
USN Submarine rescue chamber

Diving bells have been used for submarine rescue. The closed dry bell is designed to seal against the deck of the submarine above an escape hatch. Water in the space between the bell and the submarine is pumped out and the hatches can be opened to allow occupants to leave the submarine and enter the bell. The hatches are then closed, the bell skirt flooded to release it from the submarine, and the bell with its load of survivors is hoisted back to the surface, where the survivors exit and the bell may return for the next group. The internal pressure in the bell is usually kept as close as possible to atmospheric pressure to minimise run time by reducing or eliminating the need for decompression, so the seal between the bell skirt and the submarine deck is critical to the safety of the operation. This seal is provided by using a flexible sealing material, usually a type of rubber, which is pressed firmly against the smooth hatch surround by the pressure differential when the skirt is pumped out.

The McCann Submarine Rescue Chamber uses a cable attached to a bail on the submarine's escape hatch by a diver or ROV to guide the bell into place and hold it steady while the space between bell and hatch is pumped clear of water, after which hydrostatic pressure holds the bell in place and a rubber seal keeps the water out while the transfer is done. As of 2008 the McCann Rescue Chamber System was still in service in several navies, including the USN, as a reserve system, along with the deep submergence rescue vehicles, and the Turkish Navy. The original system relied on a diver connecting the cable to the hatch, but this could also be done by a ROV.

=== Crewed deep-submergence rescue vehicles ===
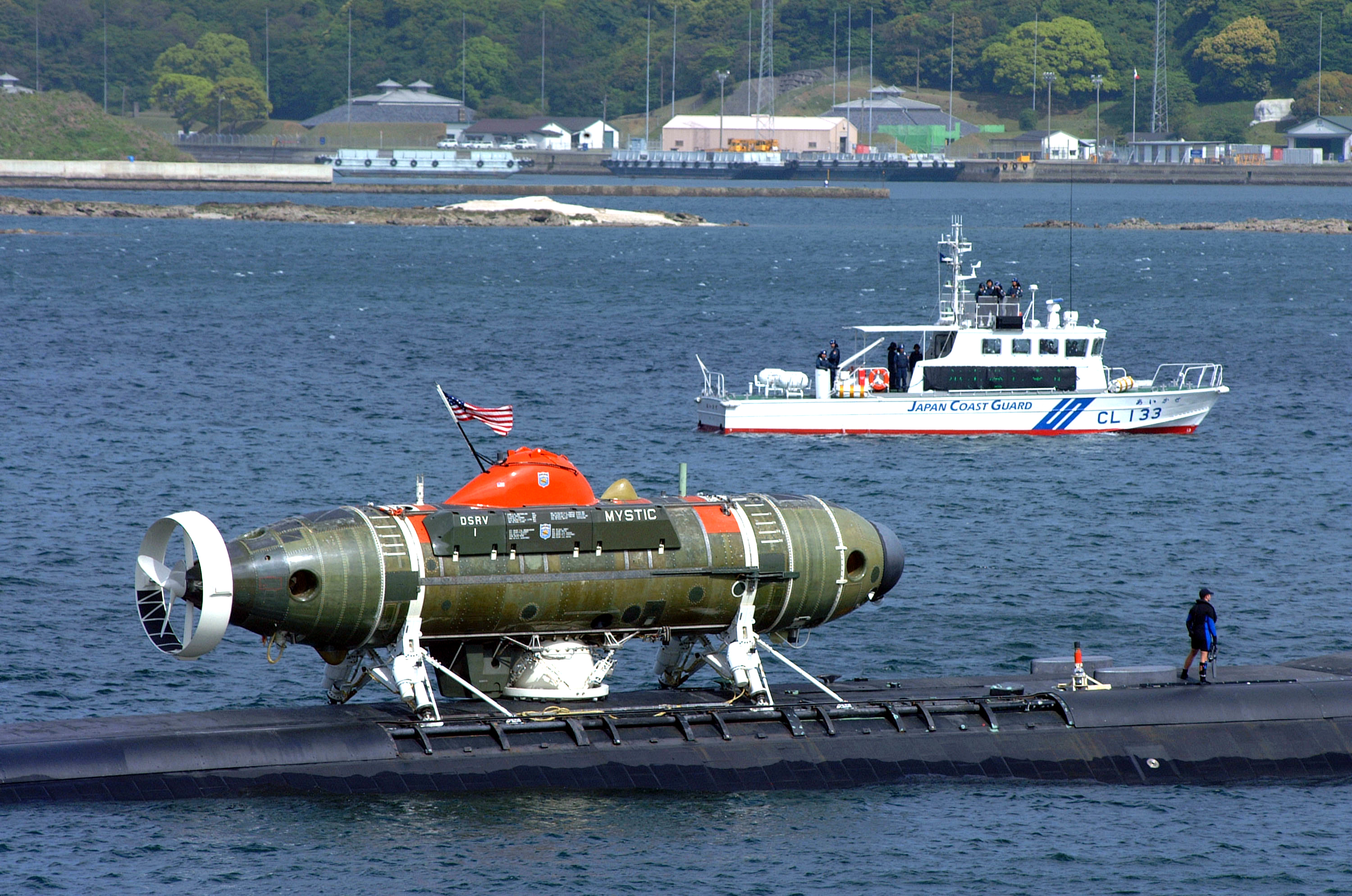
The US Navy's DSRV-1 Mystic docked to a Los Angeles-class attack submarine

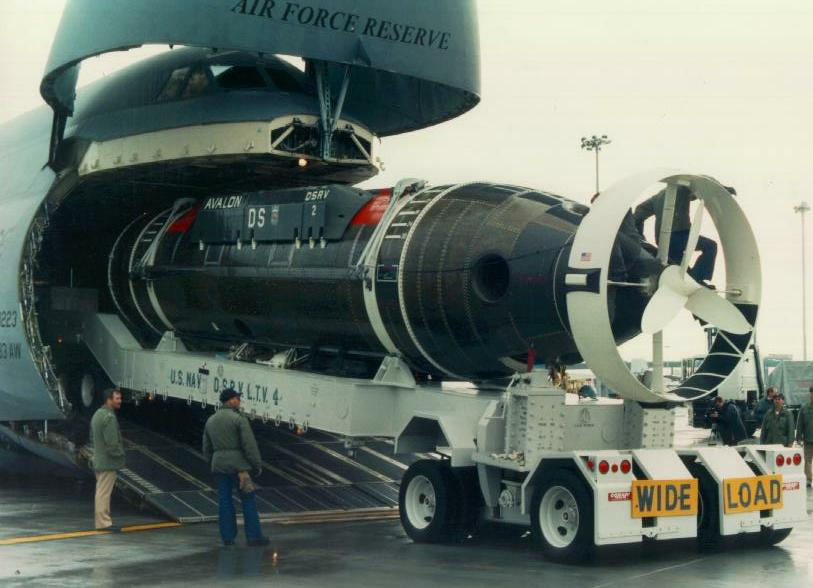
DSRV 2 Avalon on D.S.R.V.L.T.V. 4 (... land transport vehicle 4) being loaded onto a C-5 freight plane for air transport.

A deep-submergence rescue vehicle (DSRV) is a type of deep-submergence vehicle used for rescue of downed submarines. While DSRV is the term most often used by the United States Navy, other nations have different designations for their equivalent vehicles.

A deep-submergence rescue vehicle has a pressure hull with internal space to carry several survivors, and the capacity to lock onto a disabled submarine's escape hatch surrounds, pump out the water from the space between its hatch and that of the submarine at a maximum operating depth which depends on the model, after which the pressure is equalised between the interiors of submarine and DSRV, the hatches are opened and survivors climb into the rescue vehicle. After transfer the hatches are sealed, the trunking is vented to the sea, and the connection released. The DSRV returns to the mother sub to repeat the locking procedure and discharge its passengers, after which it can repeat the procedure until the survivors have all been rescued. Large batteries power the electrical, hydraulic and life support systems. The vehicle has movable ballast for trim control to allow mating with the submarine at angle up to about 60 degrees from the horizontal. Most DRSVs are air transportable by large cargo aircraft, allowing rapid deployment worldwide, using a vessel of opportunity as the support ship.

Some DSRVs can be transported to the rescue site on a submarine, allowing deployment underwater where sea surface conditions are not a limitation. Several trips may be necessary to recover all personnel. Rescue is usually accomplished by ferrying survivors to the mother submarine, but they can also be taken to a suitably equipped surface support ship.

=== Remotely operated underwater vehicles ===
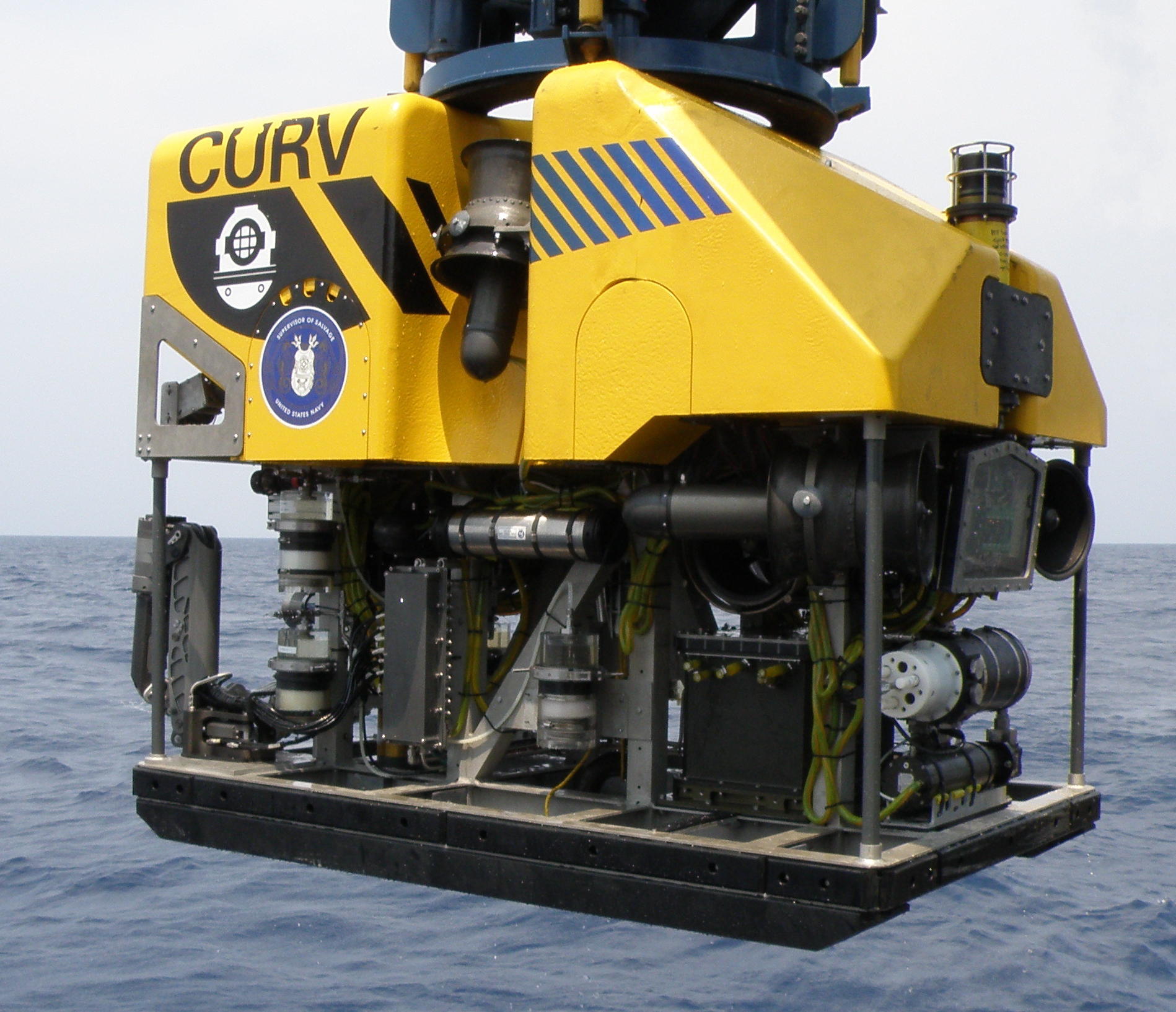
CURV-21 — remotely operated underwater vehicle of the United States Navy

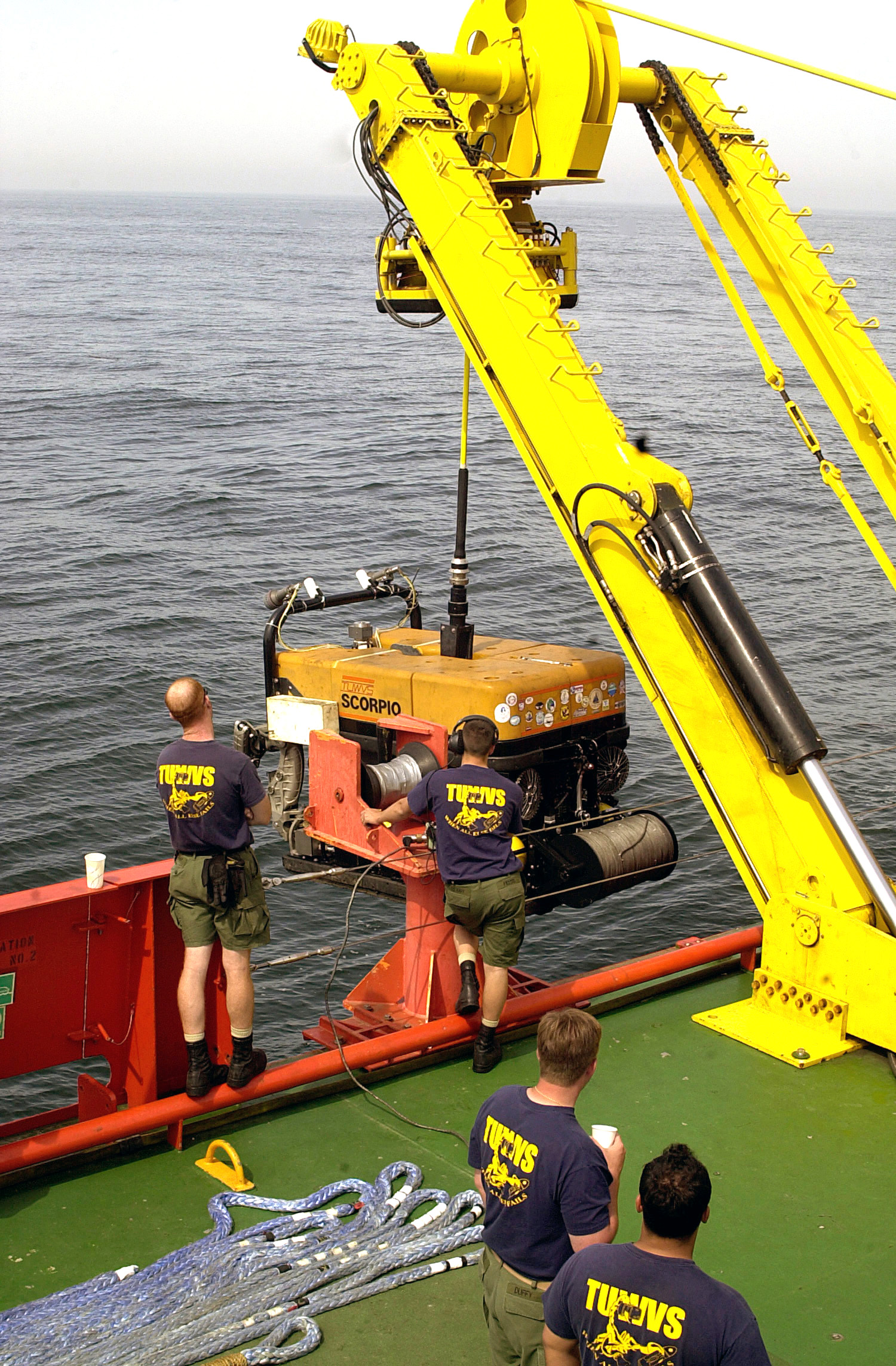
US Navy Deep Submergence Unit (DSU) Unmanned Vehicle Detachment (UMA Det) personnel guide the Super Scorpio remote operated vehicle (ROV) to a safe recovery

Remotely operated underwater vehicles (ROVs) are unmanned, tethered submersibles controlled from the surface. In submarine rescues, they are used to assess the submarine's condition, deliver supplies, and prepare for rescue operations. Equipped with cameras, sonar, robotic arms, and cutting tools, ROVs can attach communication lines, clear obstructions, and connect rescue equipment to the submarine's escape hatches. ROVs operate at depths beyond human divers' limits, making them essential for locating and stabilizing distressed submarines in challenging underwater conditions.

Examples of ROVs include:

- ASRV Remora
- Submarine Rescue Diving Recompression System

== International co-operation ==
The International Submarine Escape and Rescue Liaison Office ("ISMERLO") is an organization that coordinates international submarine search and rescue operations. It was established in 2003 by NATO and the Submarine Escape and Rescue Working Group (SMERWG) following the disaster of the Russian submarine K-141 Kursk, to provide an international liaison service to prevent peacetime submarine accidents, and to quickly respond on a global basis if they do occur. ISMERLO has an international team of submarine escape and rescue experts based at Northwood, UK.

In modern times NATO and ISMERLO continue to work with allies across the world to better the work on submarine rescues. As of late 2024, these organizations completed "Exercise Dynamic Monarch," which is a joint exercise held with 10 nations, including Canada, France, Germany, the Netherlands, Norway, Poland, Sweden, Turkey, the United Kingdom, and the United States. This exercise allowed these nations to demonstrate their own rescue systems, such as the NSRS, which is a life saving system developed by France, Norway, and the UK and which can save up to 15 patients at a time including those confined to stretchers. This vessel has the operational goal of being able to be anywhere in the world in 96 hours. The continuous combined effort of nations will further grow submarine survival rates.

== See also ==
- Escape trunk – Ambient pressure escape system for submarines
- Submarine rescue ship – Support ship for submarine rescue and deep-sea salvage operations
- Submarine Escape and Rescue system (Royal Swedish Navy)
- Submarine escape training facility – Facility used for training submariners in methods of escape from a sunken submarine
- Decompression chambers-used aboard rescue ships to help acclimate survivors
