= Submarine escape training facility =

Facility used for training submariners in methods of escape from a sunken submarine

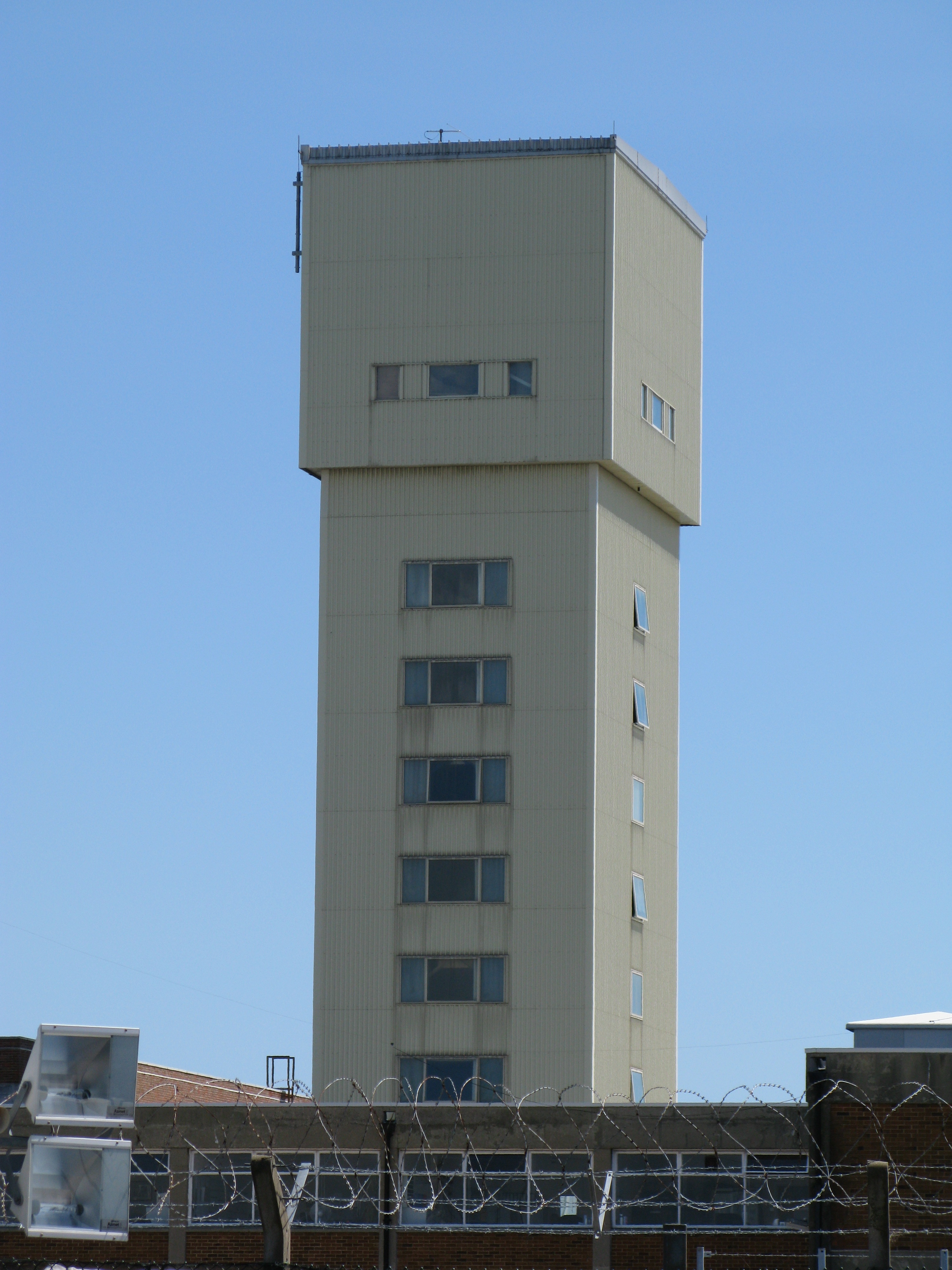
The outside of the Royal Navy SETT at Fort Blockhouse

A Submarine Escape Training Tower is a facility used for training submariners in methods of emergency escape from a disabled submarine underwater. It is a deep tank filled with water with at least one underwater entrance at depth simulating an airlock in a submarine. Since the 1930s, towers have been built for use by the Royal Navy, US Navy, Royal Australian Navy and in several other countries.

== Royal Navy SETT ==
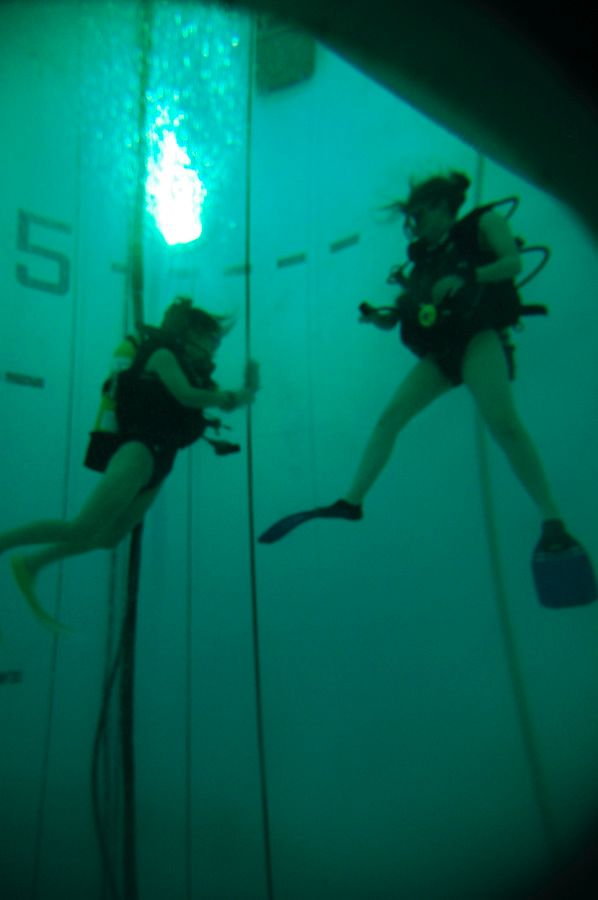
Divers in the SETT

The Submarine Escape Training Tank (SETT) is a 100-foot (30 m) deep facility primarily operated to conduct training with submarine escape equipment, operated by the Royal Navy. The facility, located at Fort Blockhouse, Gosport opposite HMNB Portsmouth, includes a fresh, chlorinated water column with a single escape chamber (as fitted to some classes of RN submarines) mounted at the base, through which students can conduct a fully representative escape cycle from 100 feet (30 m), closely replicating actions which would be required if forced to abandon a distressed submarine from depth. The SETT has its own dedicated boiler house to maintain its water temperature at 34 °C (94 °F). The SETT was commissioned in 1954, with the first students trained in July of that year. Since that time completion of ‘the Tank’ has been a rite of passage for all RN Submariners. Training includes ascents from increasing depths as a major element, but in addition is underpinned by lectures and practical training in how to survive within a disabled submarine, operation of emergency equipment and survival techniques on reaching the surface – a package of potentially life saving skills. Over the years, the SETT has been used to train submariners from Italy, USA, Greece, Canada, Israel, Russia, Venezuela, Turkey, Australia and the Netherlands – with the staff and facility enjoying a worldwide reputation for excellence and good practice. Owing to a combination of increased safety associated with modern submarine design, submarines operating in areas where escape would be impossible with current equipment and the risks associated with the conduct of training, the RN discontinued pressurised submarine escape training in March 2009.

The staff at SETT are drawn from the ranks of the UK Submarine Service. All members of SETT staff form part of the SMERAT (Submarine Escape and Rescue Advisory Team), some members form the UK SPAG (Submarine Parachute Assistance Group), and some form part of the UK contribution to the NSRS (LR5) Team. All staff are trained in advanced life-saving techniques and diving medicine.

=== Other uses ===
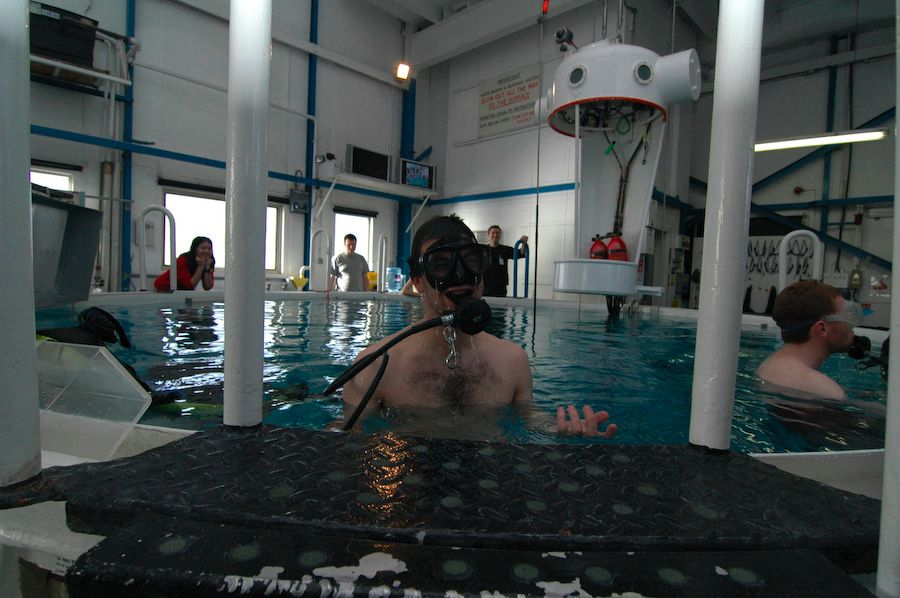
Top of the SETT pool

The tower was also privately hired to civilian diving clubs for the purpose of recreational diving and dive training. It was a popular 'novelty' dive amongst UK scuba divers since it allowed new trainees to extend their depth experience in a safe, controlled environment with good visibility and warm water temperature – two conditions that are in short supply in the UK. For similar reasons it was also used for freediving training, with participants including women's world record-holder Tanya Streeter. In addition, the SETT has been used frequently for both underwater equipment testing, and to support media activity – notably hosting Blue Peter on a number of occasions, with some presenters completing ascent training. It has also been used frequently as a situation assessment trials tank (SATT) for technical divers.

== US Navy ==
US Navy escape towers were known as Escape Training Tanks. From the 1930s through the 1990s, they were used for training in buoyant ascent, the Momsen lung, and the Steinke hood.

The ETT at Pearl Harbor, Hawaii

The tower on Sub-Base Pearl Harbor was used between 1932 and 1983. The U.S. escape tower in Hawaii is not in use. The tower was also used to train scuba equipped divers (SEALs) or Underwater Demolition Teams to access or egress the submarine during special operations. The tower once located on Naval Submarine Base New London was in use between 1930 and 1994 and has since been razed. The Submarine Escape Trainer, a 40-foot (12 m) high, 84,000-gallon pool with two escape trunks was constructed at New London in 2007.

== Other facilities ==
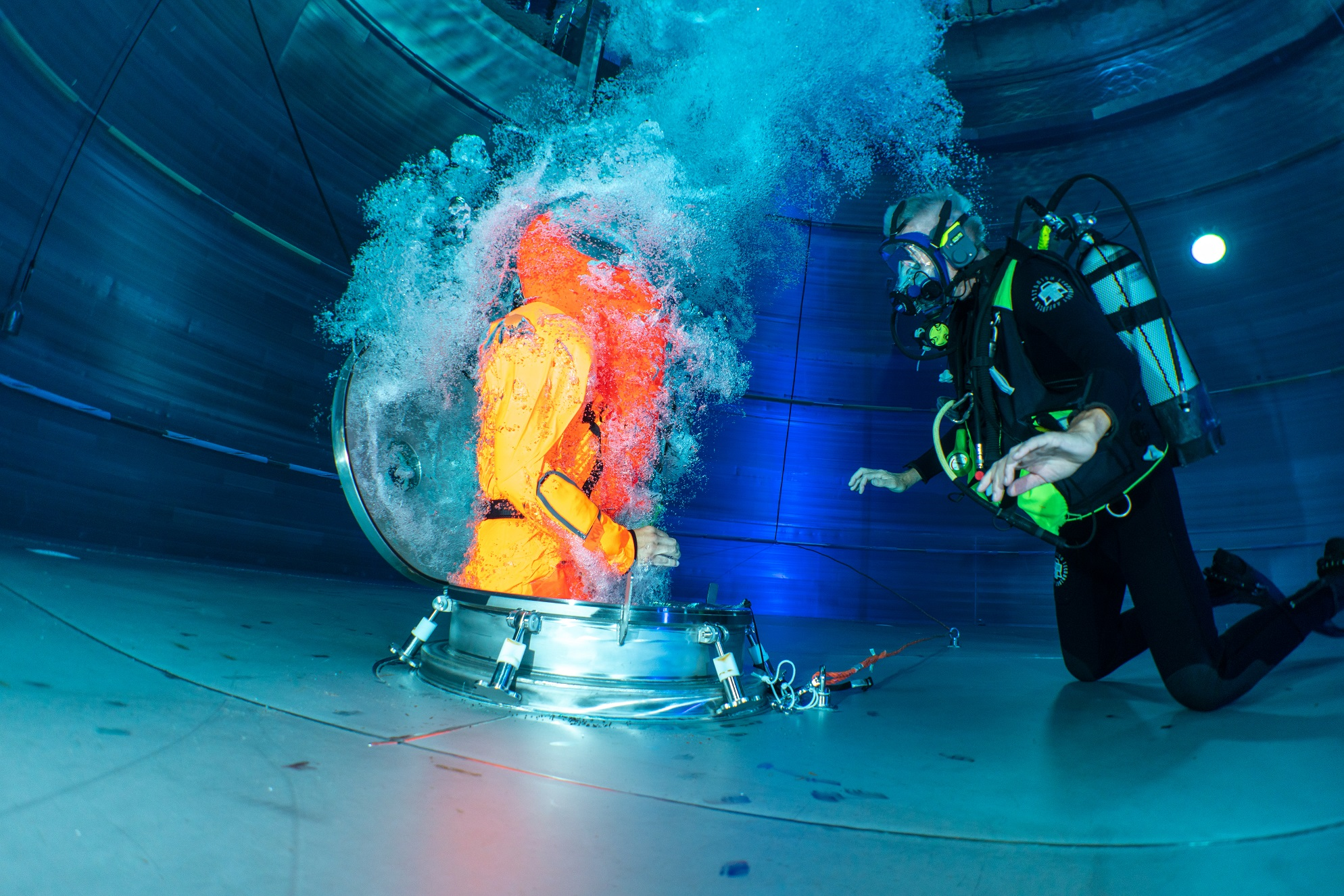
Submarine Escape Training at Triton 12 in the Netherlands.

Similar facilities are operated by the Royal Australian Navy at the Submarine Escape Training Facility at HMAS Stirling, in Norway and Sweden, and in Turkey at Gölcük Naval Base. The German Navy operates a 36-metre-deep escape training pool, built in 1977, at Einsatzausbildungszentrum Schadensabwehr Marine (Damage Control Training Centre) in Neustadt in Holstein.

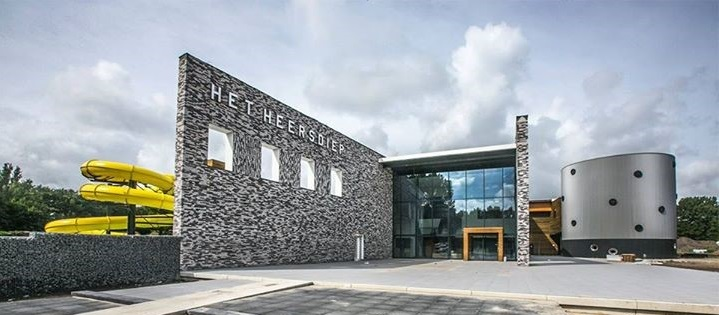
Triton 12, The Netherlands

Since 2013 there is a submarine escape training tank situated next to non-profit swimming pool Het Heersdiep in Den Helder, The Netherlands. This tank is used by the Royal Netherlands Navy and also by other navies from all over the world. The tower at Aquacentrum Den Helder can also be used by civilian diving clubs for recreational diving and dive training. It is also used for freediving training and for fire brigade diving training.

The South African Navy has a submarine escape training tank at the navy diving school at the SAS Simonsberg training unit in Simon's Town on the Cape Peninsula.
