= Smer =

Smer could refer to:

- Direction – Social Democracy, a political party in Slovakia
- Óscar Almaraz Smer (1968–2025), Mexican politician and businessman
- Submarine Escape and Rescue system (Royal Swedish Navy), a system for rescuing submarines in the Swedish Navy
