= Survitec Group =

British manufacturer of personal survival equipment

- Industry: Survival equipment for marine, defence and aerospace
- Founded: 1920
- Founder: Reginald Foster Dagnall
- Headquarters: 1-5 Beaufort Road, Birkenhead, Merseyside, England, CH41 1HQ
- Area served: Global
- Key people: Ron Krisanda; Executive Chairman
- Products: G-suits, inflatable liferafts, lifejackets, immersion suits, Chemical, biological, radiological, and nuclear suits (CBRN), Fire retardant suits, liquid cooling vests, marine evacuation systems
- Website: Survitec

Survitec Group is a British manufacturer of personal survival equipment for usage after ejecting from aircraft or when at sea.

== History ==
=== RFD ===
Reginald Foster Dagnall formed RFD in 1920 in Surrey. Beaufort had been founded in 1852.

RFD liferafts and dinghies were used extensively in World War II for allied aircrew.

RFD Beaufort pioneered submarine escape technology in the 1950s, known as Submarine Escape Immersion Equipment (SEIE).

=== Survitec ===
The Survitec Group was actually formed in 2000. In 2001 it bought DSB (Deutsche Schlauchboot GmbH). In 2009, The Shark Group (founded in 1975) closed its Northumberland site and production was moved to Birkenhead.

In 2004, it was bought by Montagu Private Equity for £146 million.

In January 2010, Survitec was bought by the private equity firm Warburg Pincus from Montagu Private Equity for £280 million.

In December 2010, it bought Revere Supply Inc of Florida, to become SSPI.

In May 2011, Survitec began the process of acquiring two further companies; Grimsby-based Cosalt Marine, for £31 million. and the commercial liferaft and MES business of Bordeaux-based Zodiac. Cosalt Marine, employed over 450 people at 21 worldwide sites, with a turnover of £57 million.

== Structure ==
Its headquarters and registered office is on Beaufort Road in Birkenhead. The RFD Beaufort factory in Birkenhead is on the A5030 between Poulton and Claughton, next to the Great Float. The RFD Beaufort factory in Dunmurry is on the A1.

It has servicing plants around the world:

- Sharon Center, Ohio, USA - RFD Beaufort Inc
- Grimsby, United Kingdom
- Grosseto, Tuscany, Italy - Eurovinil
- Plymouth, England
- Eschershausen, Niedersachsen, Germany - DSB (Deutsche Schlauchboot GmbH)
- Les Attaques, Pas-de-Calais, France - RFD France
- Belgium - Antwerp, Ostend
- Netherlands - Grou, Rotterdam
- Spain - Algeciras, Barcelona
- Birkenhead - RFD Beaufort
- Dunmurry - RFD Beaufort
- Dyce, Aberdeen - SurvivalOne and Shark Group (formerly in Broomhill, Northumberland)
- Aberdeen - - Survitec Survival Craft
- Yokohama, Kanagawa Prefecture, Japan - RFD Japan
- Shanghai, China - WH Brennan
- Hong Kong - WH Brennan WH Brennan
- Singapore - WH Brennan WH Brennan
- Australia Auburn, New South Wales, Sydney, Australia - RFD Australia, Freemantle, Melbourne, Slacks Creek
- New Zealand - Auckland, Christchurch, Nelson, Wellington
- Gosport, UK ("Crewsaver")
- Canada - Dartmouth, Mount Pearl, Vancouver ("DBC")
- Norway - Aalesund, Bergen, Stokmarnes, Kristiansand
- Sweden - Gothenburg

=== Customers ===
Customers include

- Ministry of Defence
- US Navy
- US Air Force
- Royal Australian Air Force
- Royal Australian Navy
- Shell
- Lockheed Martin
- BAE Systems
- Carnival Cruise Lines
- Royal Caribbean Cruises
- Princess Cruises
