= Momsen lung =

Rebreather system for escaping sunken submarines

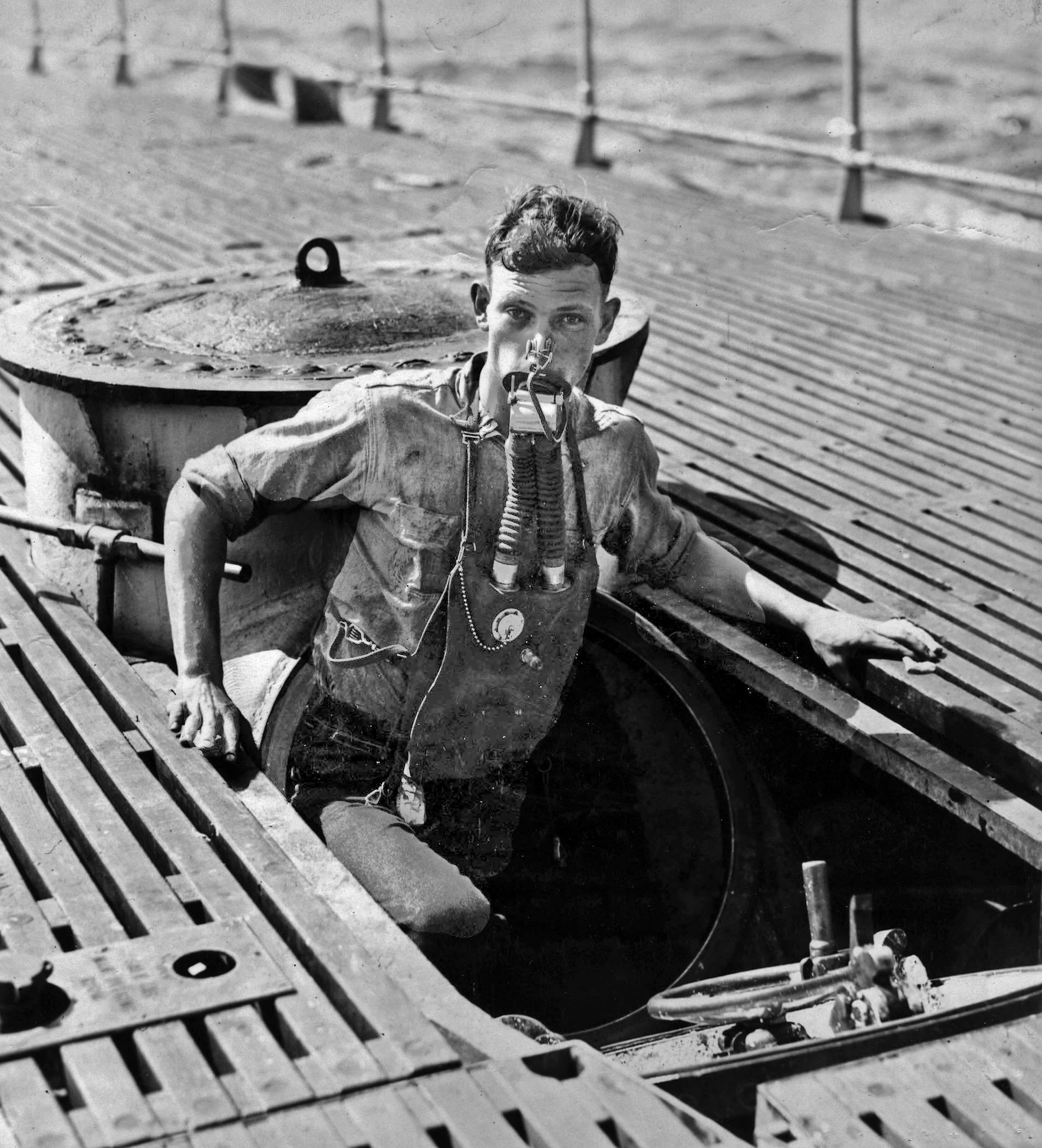
A Momsen lung in use during training

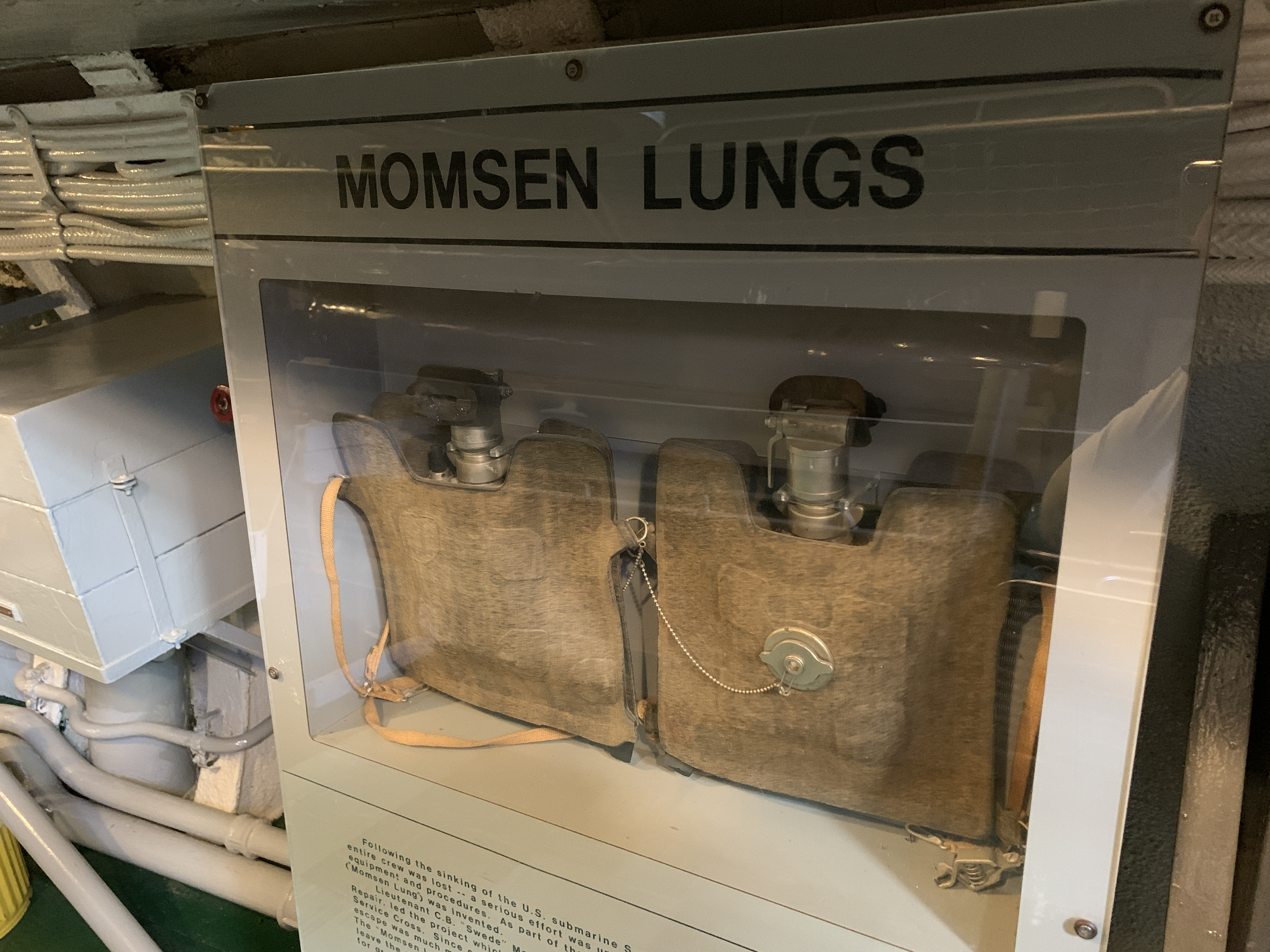
Momsen lungs on display on USS Drum

The Momsen lung was a primitive underwater rebreather used before and during World War II by American submariners as emergency escape gear. It was invented by Charles Momsen, who worked on it from 1929 to 1932. Submariners trained with this apparatus in an 80 ft (24 m) deep Escape Training Tank at New London, Mare Island, or Pearl Harbor. It was introduced as standard equipment on Porpoise (P)-class and Salmon-class boats.

The device recycled the breathing gas by using a counterlung containing soda lime to remove the carbon dioxide. The lung was initially filled with oxygen and connected to a mouthpiece by twin hoses containing one-way valves, one for breathing in and the other for breathing out.

The only known emergency use of the Momsen lung was during the escape from USS Tang on October 25, 1944. Thirteen men (of thirty survivors) left the forward escape trunk: five were picked up by the Japanese; three more reached the surface "but were unable to hang on or breathe and floated off and drowned"; the fate of the other five is unknown. Not all the escapees from the trunk used the Momsen lung. An officer had his mouthpiece knocked out shortly after leaving the submarine. One of the trunk ascents was made without a Momsen lung. Many were unable to leave the trunk or did not attempt to escape after being discouraged by the difficulties faced by those who attempted to escape before them. Most of the crew perished.

The Momsen lung was replaced by the Steinke hood beginning in 1962.

German submarines had such a escape breathing apparatus as standard equipment since 1912.

The British Royal Navy had used the similar Davis Submerged Escape Apparatus since 1927. They adopted the practice of "blow and go" in which the sailor would exhale before ascent to avoid air over-expanding the lungs, which could cause them to rupture. This has since been found to be higher risk than a constant relaxed exhalation during ascent. Walter F. Schlech, Jr. and others examined submerged escape without breathing devices and discovered that ascent was possible from as deep as 300 ft (91 m). One writer suggested that "the Momsen Lung concept may have killed far more submariners than it rescued".

== See also ==
- Steinke hood – Submarine escape breathing apparatus
- Submarine Escape Immersion Equipment – Whole-body exposure suit that allows submariners to escape from a sunken submarine
- Escape set – Self contained breathing apparatus providing gas to escape from a hazardous environment
