= Submarine Escape and Rescue system (Royal Swedish Navy) =

The Royal Swedish Navy's Submarine Escape and Rescue system (SMER) is a set of equipment used by the Swedish Navy to provide rescue facilities for the crews of disabled submarines. The submarine rescue ship, the submarine rescue vessel, and the escape system on the submarines, which consists of an escape trunk and an escape suit, are its three main parts.

== Components ==
1. The Submarine Rescue Vessel named URF (a Swedish acronym for UbåtsRäddningsFarkost – Submarine Rescue Vessel)
2. The diving and submarine rescue ship HSwMS Belos (A214)
3. The escape system (which includes all Swedish submarines being fitted with a single person escape trunk, personal escape equipment on board the submarines such as escape suits, and an escape training tank ashore at Karlskrona Naval base) (link to new wikipage on dyktanken).

== Early development ==
From the very beginning of the Royal Swedish Navy's submarine era, the issue of Submarine Escape and Rescue has been an integrated part of the submarine system.

The first submarine of the Royal Swedish Navy (Hajen, which was delivered in 1904), could be equipped with prefabricated pontoons that were constructed for fulfilling two goals. First, they reduce draft when needed e.g. for passing through the Göta Canal, a channel through Sweden between the east and west coast. Secondly, they could also be used for surfacing the entire submarine in case of an accident. At this time, the only methods available for rescuing a submarine crew were either lifting the entire submarine (a method unlikely to succeed due to the long time it takes to carry out) or individual escape from the submarine.

In the 1920s, equipment to assist the submariner to perform free escape like the Davis Submerged Escape Apparatus (Davis, 1995) was tested by the Royal Swedish Navy. In 1926, the Dräger (in Sweden denominated Dräger M/25) was issued as the navy's first escape apparatus, followed by several other models by Davis, Dräger, Momsen and AGA (Lindemark, 1996). In the early days, these tests were performed in swimming pools and at beaches in open water. The first trials at sea from a submarine were performed in 1928 (Det Svenska Ubåtsvapnet 1904-2004). However, escape training for the submariners was risky from submarines, and did not provide realistic training in open water.

A 6 m deep Submarine Escape Training Tank for diving and escape-training was built at Galärvarvet in Stockholm in 1934. Later, two other diving tanks were constructed: a first one measuring 6 m depth in Göteborg, built in 1943, and a second one measuring 21 m depth (including a 2 m deep escape chamber) in Karlskrona.

The 6 m deep diving tanks are now decommissioned but the 20 m tank in Karlskrona is still in active service. The diving tank at Galärvarvet is now used as a museum open for public access, displaying history and equipment for diving and submarine rescue.

== Lessons learned from USS Squalus and HMS Thetis ==
In 1939, the successful rescue of the crew from USS Squalus combined with the unsuccessful individual escape from HMS Thetis changed the view of how to rescue submariners from a distressed submarine. The favoured method would from now on be collective rescue (link SMER).

In 1940, a used salvage ship built in 1885 was purchased for the navy. In order to function as a rescue ship, she was equipped with a McCann-type rescue chamber (one of the two original McCann-type rescue chambers is on display at the escape training tank museum at Galärvarvet, Stockholm). The ship was commissioned in 1942 with the new name Belos. One of her first missions was to search for the missing Swedish submarine Ulven in 1943. Divers from Belos eventually identified Ulven which was later recovered and declared lost with all hands sunk by a stray mine.

== Post-WWII development ==
In 1963, the new ship (II) took over the duties of her predecessor, still using the McCann-type rescue chamber system. Belos (II) had greater capacity for mooring and diving. The diving system was improved over the years and could be used for diving to a maximum depth of approximately 300 meters.

In the early seventies, there was a need for a new rescue vessel, driven by the ageing rescue chambers, desired Transfer Under Pressure (TUP) ability, and greater capacity regarding depth and number of rescuees.

These operational requirements resulted in the development of the Swedish Submarine Rescue Vessel URF. Designed and built by Kockums shipyard in Malmö, she was laid down in 1974, ready for trials in 1978, and was fully operational in 1980.

In parallel with designing and construction of URF, a new diving complex was built as a home base for URF at Berga Naval Base, just south of Stockholm. It comprised a personnel transport chamber for personnel transporting between the URF and the chambers, as well as research and education facilities with indoor Transfer Under Pressure facilities to a decompression chamber system. The facility also included storage and maintenance areas as well as a launching site with easy access to a training area close by. The complex was operational in 1979 and decommissioned in 2005 when the rescue system was moved to Karlskrona.

In the last 25 years, the Swedish Submarine Escape and Rescue system has developed from single units and capabilities operating in the Baltic, into an integrated rescue system with world-wide capacity. In the process of creating and improving the Royal Swedish Navy's Submarine Escape and Rescue system, other assets, exercises, and equipment have developed. These include improved escape suits, single person escape trunks, containerised decompression chambers and other equipment.

== Notes ==
- Lindemark, Claes (1996). Dykhuset på Galärvarvet. Sjöhistoriska museets rapport, 1400-2582; 33 (in Swedish). Stockholm: Sjöhistoriska museet. p. 37. ISBN 91-85268-66-6. SELIBR 7747433.
- Klintebo, Roderick, ed. (2004). Det svenska ubåtsvapnet 1904-2004. Forum navales skriftserie, 1650-1837; 9 (in Swedish). Stockholm: Literatim. pp. 175–194. ISBN 91-973075-3-X. SELIBR 9421249.
- Davis, R.H., Deep Diving and Submarine Operations: A Manual For Deep Sea Divers and Compressed Air Workers : Parts 1 and 2, Siebe, Gorman & Company LTD, Cwmbran, Ninth ed, 1995
