= Submarine Parachute Assistance Group =

Royal Navy rescue support team

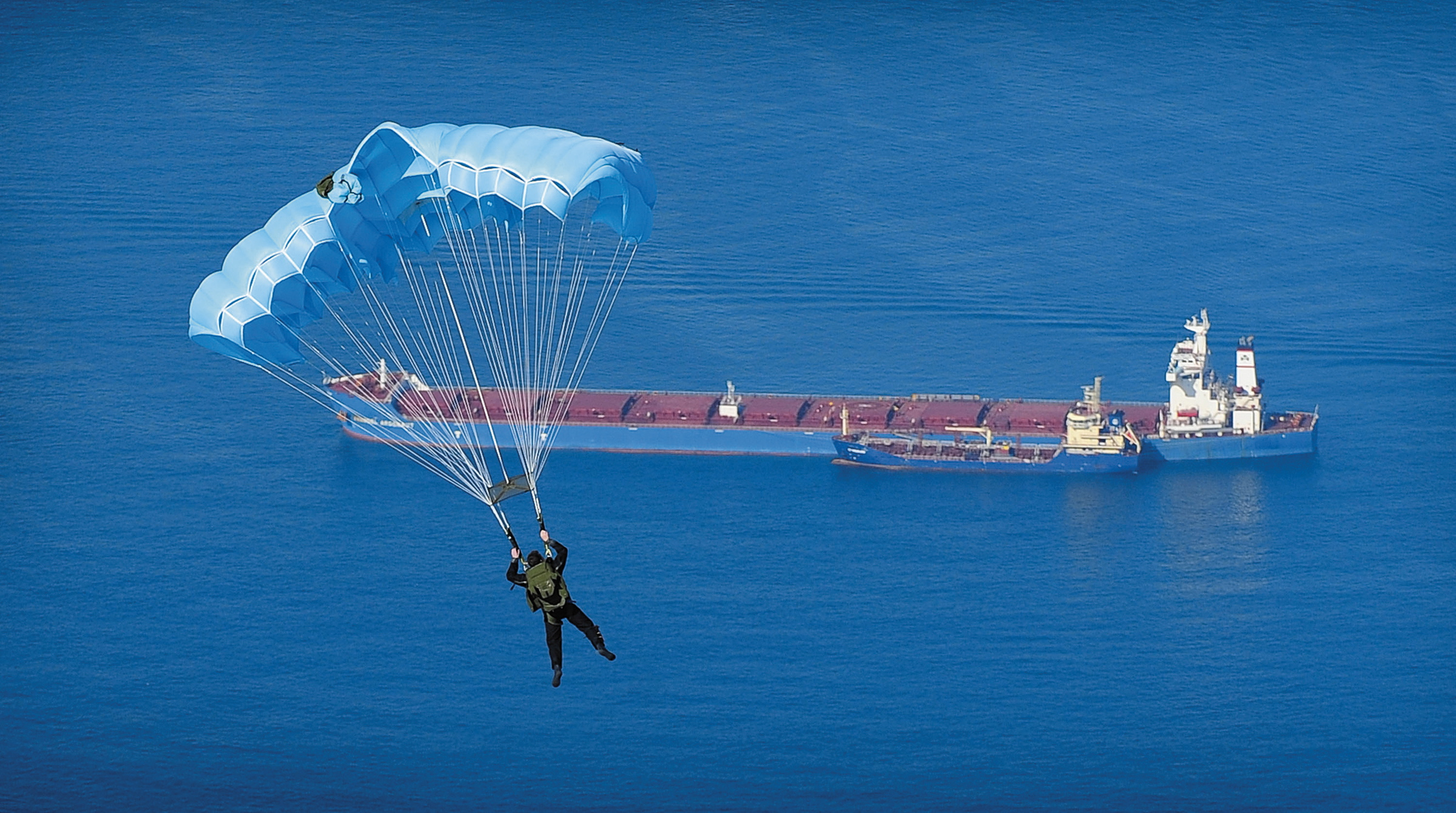
A member of the Submarine Parachute Assistance Group during a practice jump into the bay of Gibraltar in 2011

The Royal Navy's Submarine Parachute Assistance Group (SPAG) is a team who provide a rescue support capability to submarine sinking incidents worldwide, available at short notice.

== History ==
The Submarine Parachute Assistance Group was originally formed from staff of the RN Submarine Escape Training Tank (SETT) at HMS Dolphin in Gosport, Hampshire. The SETT was part of the RN Submarine School, providing wet training in submarine escape drills for both new submariners and those requiring periodic requalification. With the move of the school to HMS Raleigh in Cornwall, in 1999, the SPAG remained at the SETT until the cessation of wet training in 2009. At that point the SPAG was moved to HMS Raleigh.

On 19 November 2017, the SPAG were deployed to HMS Protector in aid of international search efforts for the missing Argentinian submarine San Juan.

== Personnel ==
The team is made up of instructor personnel from the Royal Navy Submarine School. Members of the group are trained submariners or medical staff posted to the school, subsequently trained in water entry parachute skills. While the SETT was still active, some members of SPAG were trained in diving skills.

== Deployment and role ==
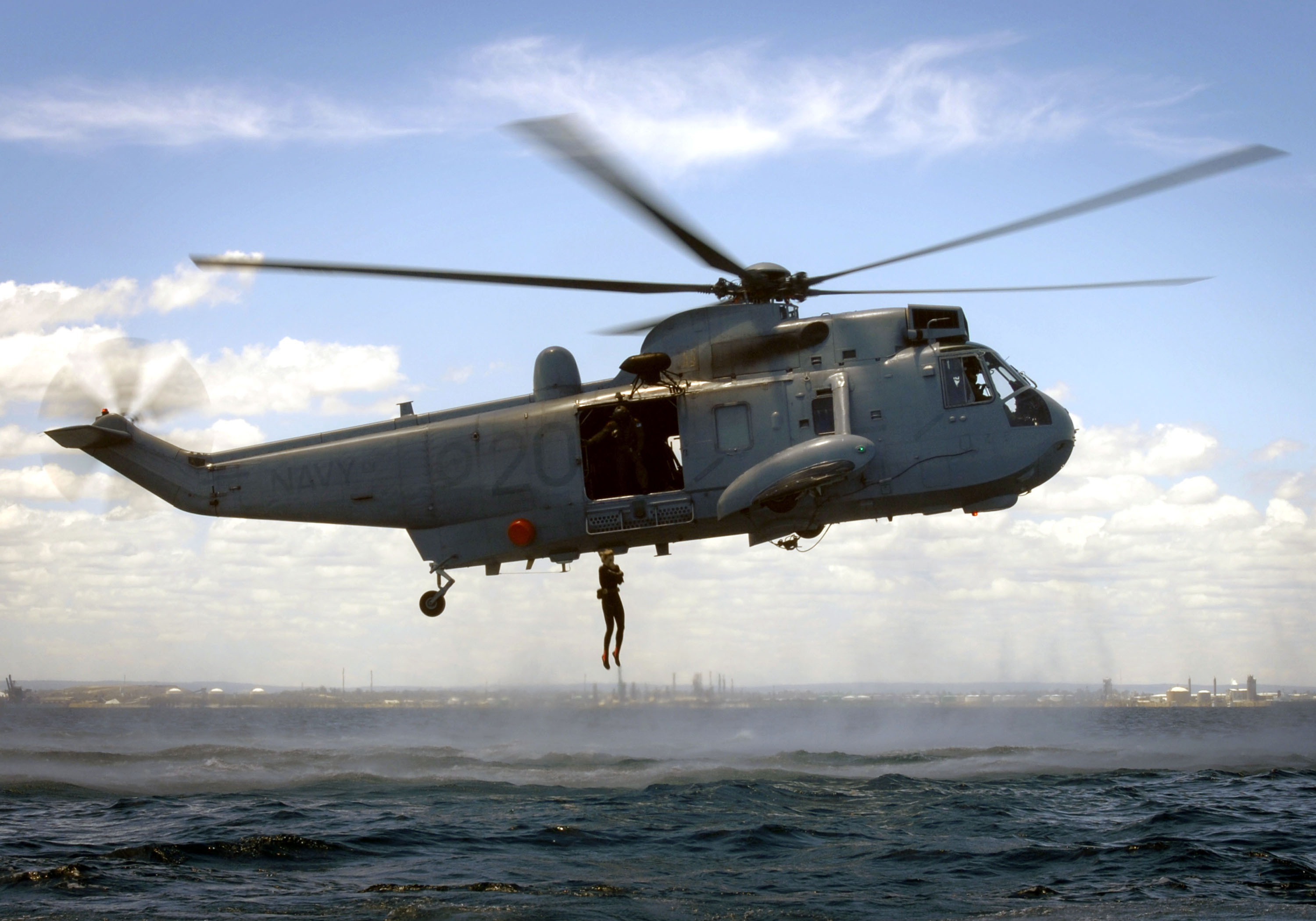
A member of the SPAG jumping from a Royal Australian Navy helicopter in 2007

The SPAG can be activated at 6 hours notice, to fly to a submarine sinking incident, regardless of the operator of the vessel. The team may work in conjunction with the NATO Submarine Rescue System.

The team is configured to enter the water at the location of the incident, using a static line from the rear ramp of the aircraft. Equipment pods dropped with the team contain Rigid-hulled inflatable boats, life rafts, food, water and medical supplies. This equipment allows the team to establish an afloat reception package for submariners evacuating the sunken vessel, in order to provide medical and life support.

== Regalia ==
Members of the SPAG are trained in basic parachuting and entitled to wear the Parachute Badge, although, due to a lack of "an arduous training course", they must wear the un-winged variant .

== See also ==
- Comando Raggruppamento Subacquei e Incursori Teseo Tesei - Italy
- Fuerza de Guerra Naval Especial - Spain
