= Steinke hood =

Submarine escape breathing apparatus

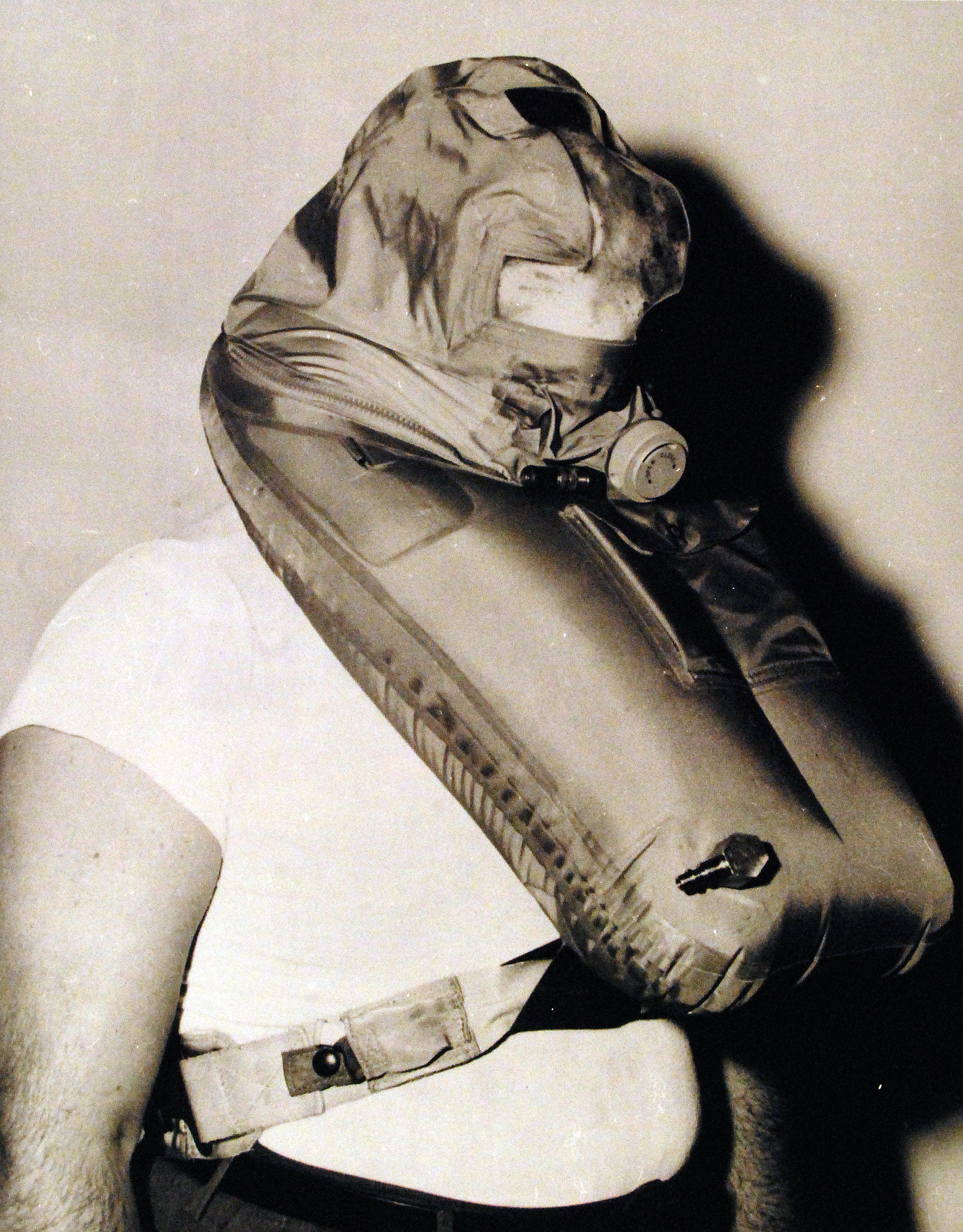
Steinke hood

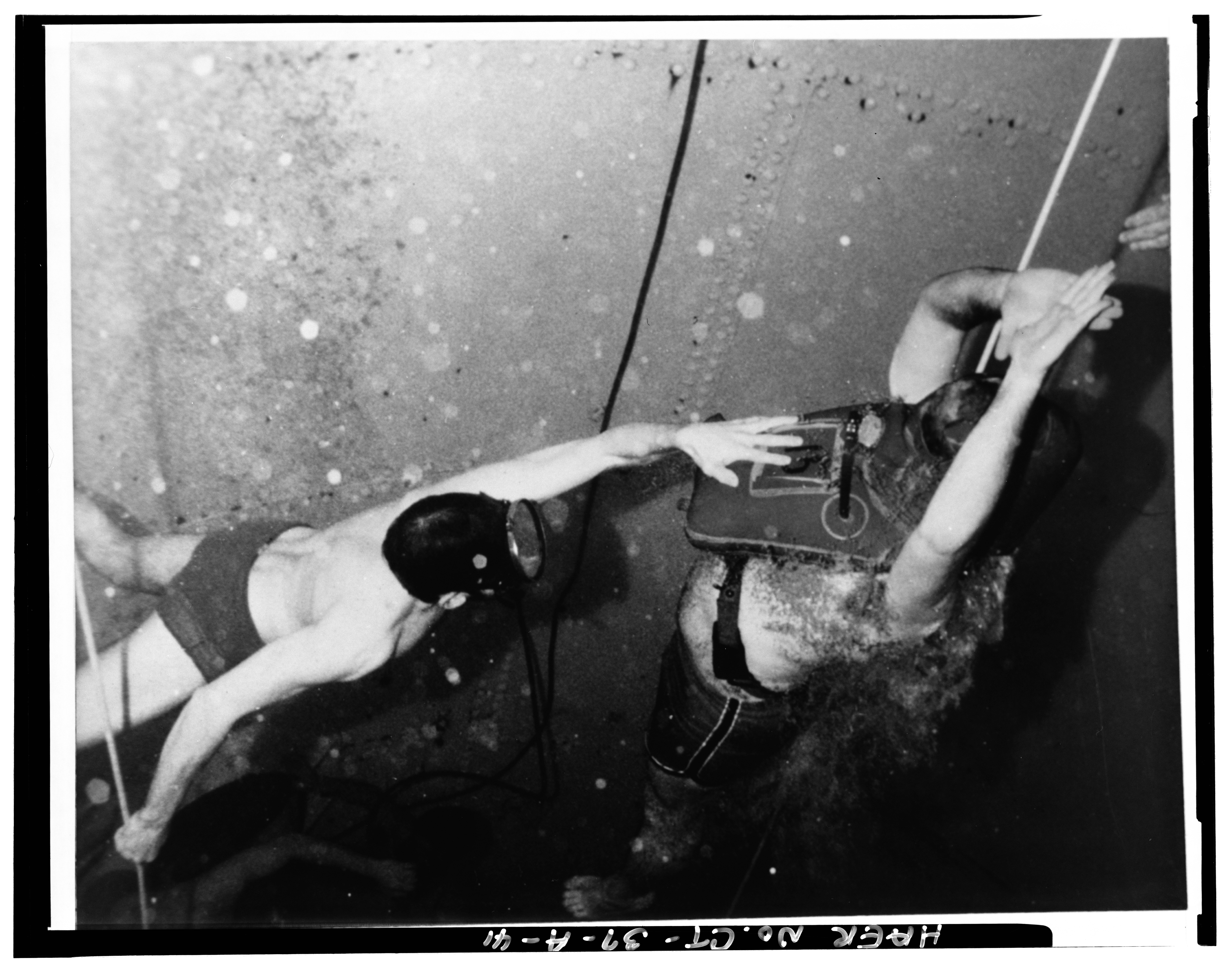
Trainee during ascent wearing a Steinke hood

A Steinke hood, named for its inventor, Lieutenant Harris Steinke, is a device designed to aid escape from a sunken submarine. In essence, it is an inflatable life jacket with a hood that completely encloses the wearer's head, trapping a bubble of breathable air. It is designed to assist buoyant ascent. An advancement over its predecessor, the Momsen lung, Steinke invented and tested it in 1961 by escaping from the USS Balao at a depth of 318 ft (97 m); it became standard equipment in all submarines of the United States Navy throughout the Cold War period. The U.S. Navy replaced Steinke hoods on U.S. submarines with escape suits called Submarine Escape Immersion Equipment in the late 2000s.

== See also ==
- Escape trunk – Ambient pressure escape system for submarines
- Momsen lung – Rebreather system for escaping sunken submarines
- Submarine Escape Immersion Equipment – Whole-body exposure suit that allows submariners to escape from a sunken submarine
