= Submarine Escape Immersion Equipment =

Whole-body exposure suit that allows submariners to escape from a sunken submarine

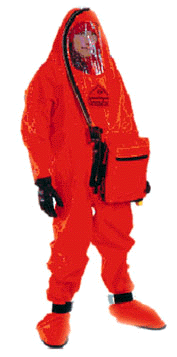
Submarine Escape Immersion Equipment suit Mk 10

Submarine Escape Immersion Equipment (SEIE), also known as Submarine Escape and Immersion Equipment, is a whole-body suit and one-person life raft that was first produced in 1952. It was designed by British company RFD Beaufort Limited and allows submariners to escape from a sunken submarine. The suit also provides protection against hypothermia and (since the Mk 10 version) has replaced the Steinke hood rescue device. The suit allows survivors to escape a disabled submarine at depths down to 600 feet (183 m), with an ascent speed of 2–3 meters/second, at a rate of eight or more sailors per hour. Submarine Escape Immersion Equipment can be a method used in submarine rescue operations.

== Design and capabilities ==
The latest generation RFD Beaufort SEIE MK11 enables free ascent from a stricken submarine and provides extensive protection for the submariner on reaching the surface until rescued. A typical assembly comprises a submarine escape and immersion suit, an inner thermal liner, and a gas-inflated single-seat life raft, all contained in a protective stowage compartment. The intention of the suit is to keep the escapee dry and protected from cold shock during ascent, and to provide buoyancy, freeboard, and thermal insulation at the surface.

== Training and operational use ==
Following a nearly 30-year hiatus, the U.S. Navy reinstituted pressurized submarine escape training (PSET) for submarine sailors in 2009, using the Beaufort Mk 10 Submarine Escape and Immersion Equipment (SEIE) suit.

In an Undersea & Hyperbaric Medicine review of training, O'Donnell and Horn report that "During the first 39 months of training, 7,025 students screened for PSET with 32% completing all phases, including two pressurized ascents. The most common reason for screening disqualification was presence of upper respiratory congestion. During training, middle ear barotrauma was responsible for 53% of attrition, primarily during the test of pressure."

The SEIE Mk-10 has been used in Royal Navy Submarines for a number of years and is scheduled to replace all Steinke hoods aboard U.S. Navy submarines as well. Crew training, and reconfiguration of escape trunks, are prerequisites to installing the new system. Several submarines have already installed the new system.

== Comparisons ==
The Steinke hood was designed for the same purpose as the SEIE, but did not include thermal insulation or a life raft. It could not protect submariners from hypothermia and weather exposure, or provide crew visibility at the surface, as the SEIE can.

The SEIE is designed to be a last resort in the event of a submarine emergency at sea. Rescue with a submarine rescue vehicle, which connects directly to a submarine's escape hatch, is still the preferred option, as it allows crew members to avoid direct exposure to cold water and high pressure at depth. If a rescue vehicle is not available or cannot connect to a sunken submarine, the crew can escape using the SEIE.

Another benefit of vehicle rescue as compared to escape with the SEIE is that there would likely be additional critical on-site resources available, such as a recompression chamber, that could be urgently needed by the rescued crew members.

Reduced risk of decompression sickness, oxygen toxicity, carbon dioxide toxicity and nitrogen narcosis is dependent on a relatively high rate of pressurization and ejection from the escape lock, as all of these hazards are time-dependent. Use of a dedicated air supply further reduces risk of carbon dioxide toxicity.

== Gallery ==
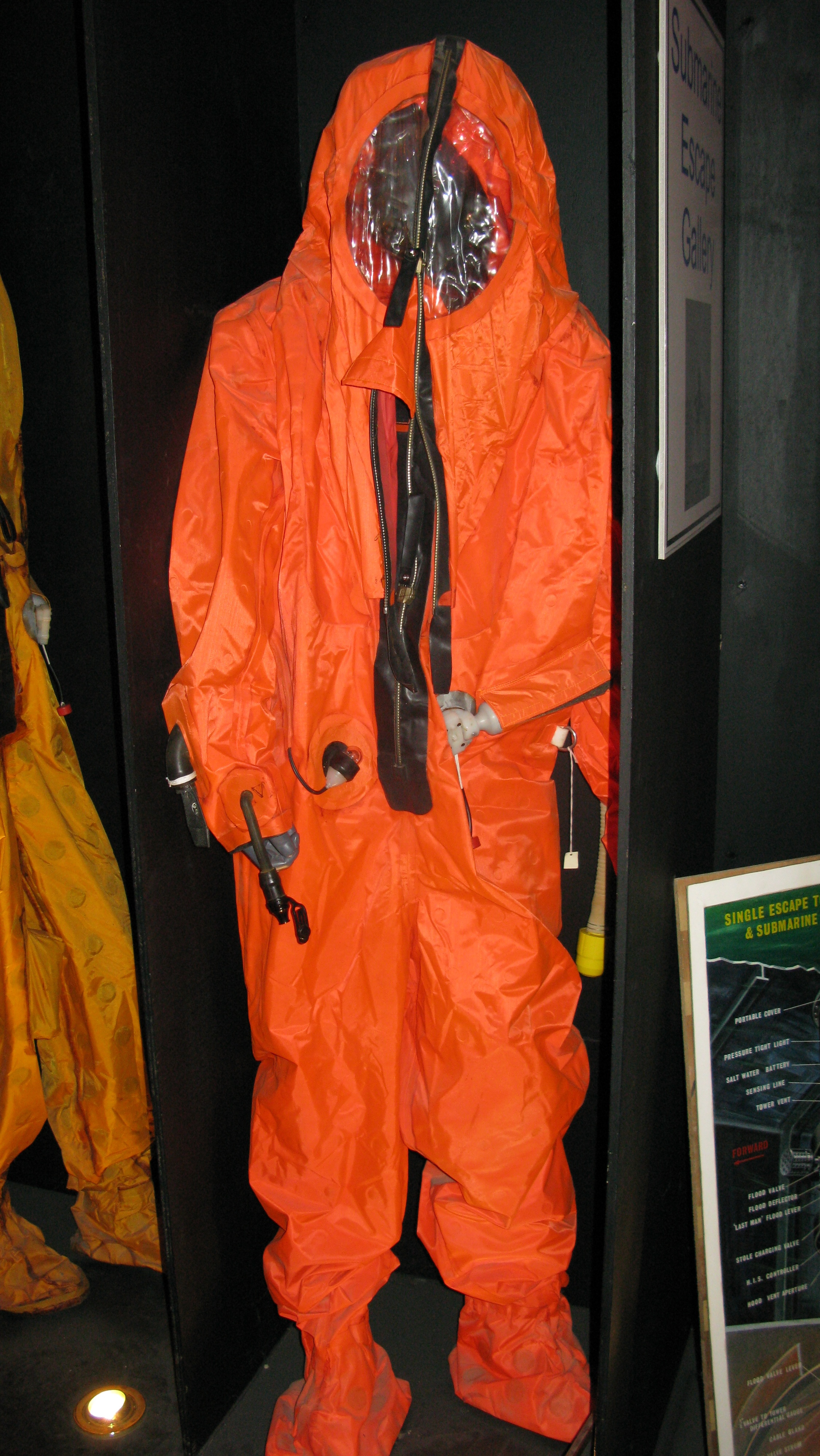
The Submarine Escape Immersion Equipment suit Mk 7

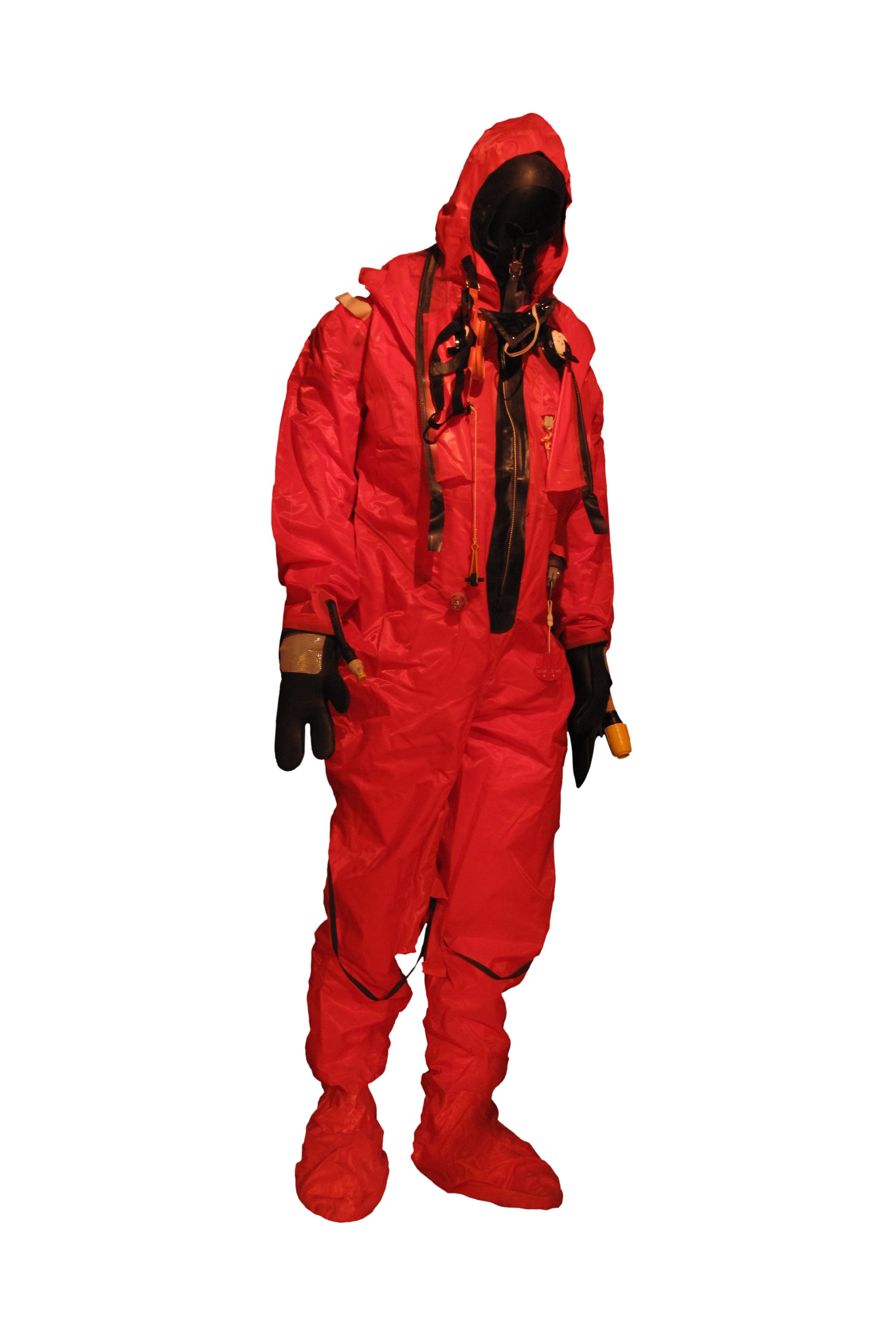
The Submarine Escape Immersion Equipment suit Mk 8F

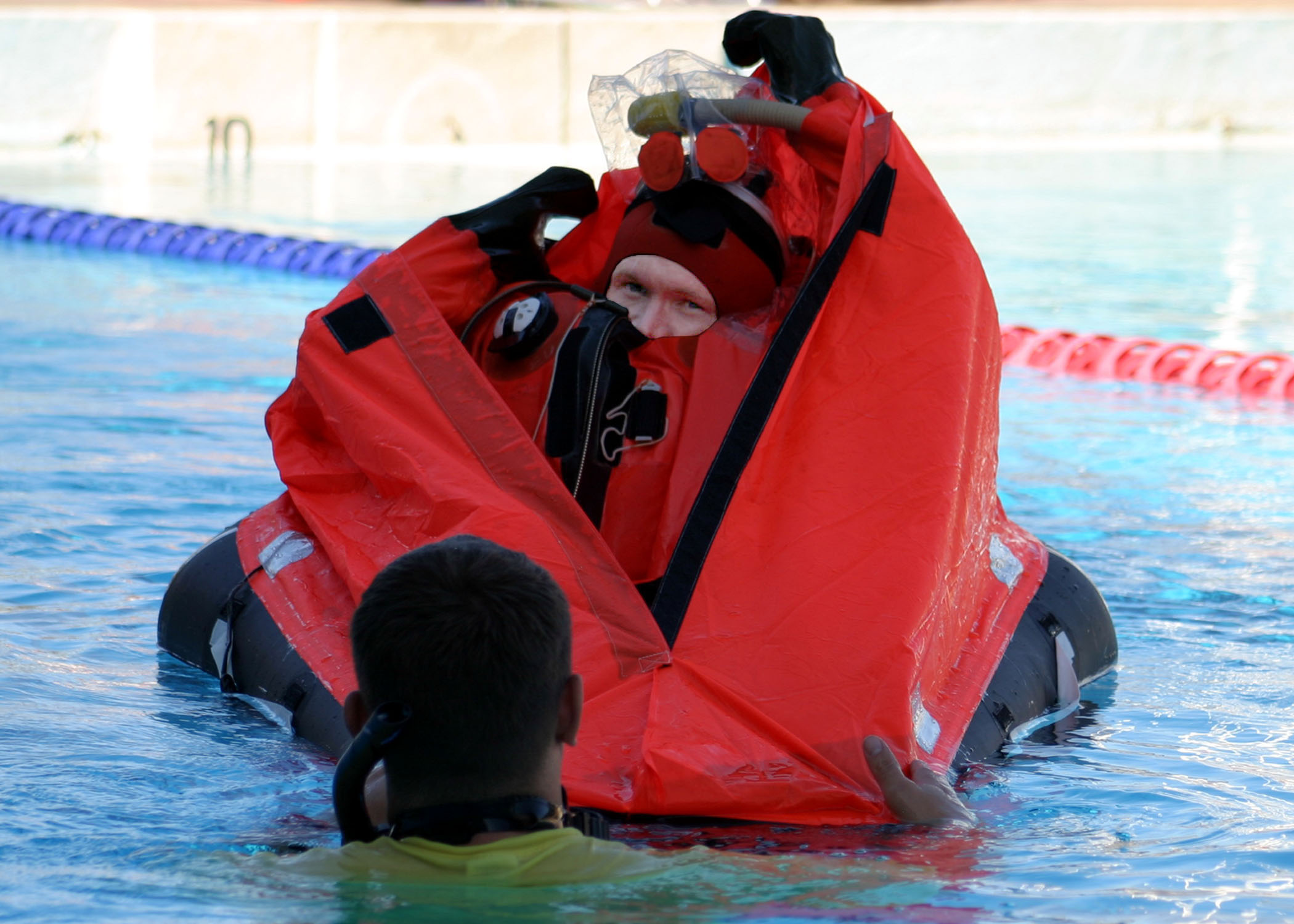
The SEIE MK-10 on the surface after escape.

== See also ==
- Davis Submerged Escape Apparatus – Oxygen rebreather
- Steinke hood – Submarine escape breathing apparatus
- Momsen lung – Rebreather system for escaping sunken submarines
- Escape set – Self contained breathing apparatus providing gas to escape from a hazardous environment
