= Escape trunk =

Ambient pressure escape system for submarines

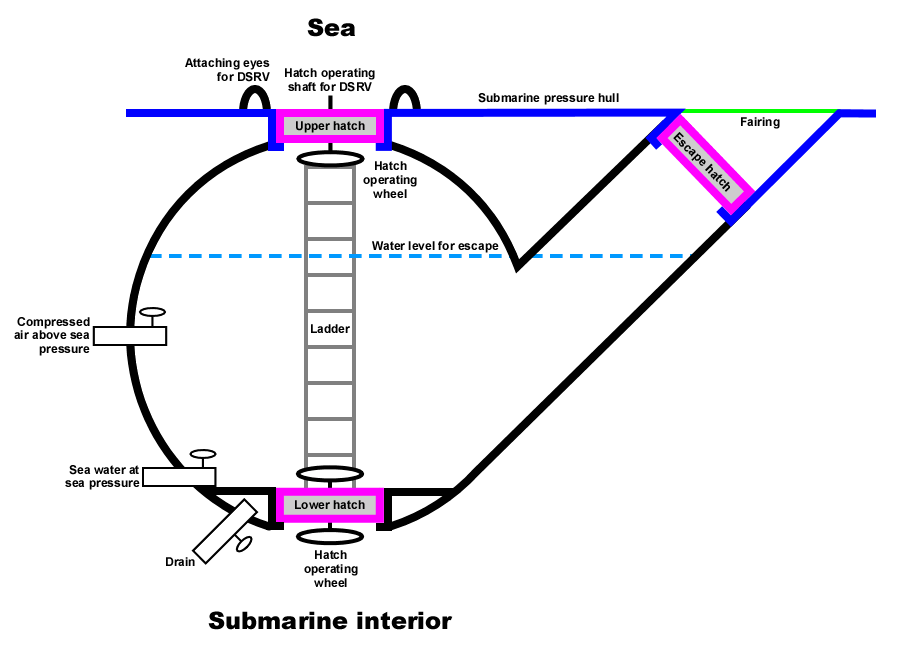
Submarine escape trunk

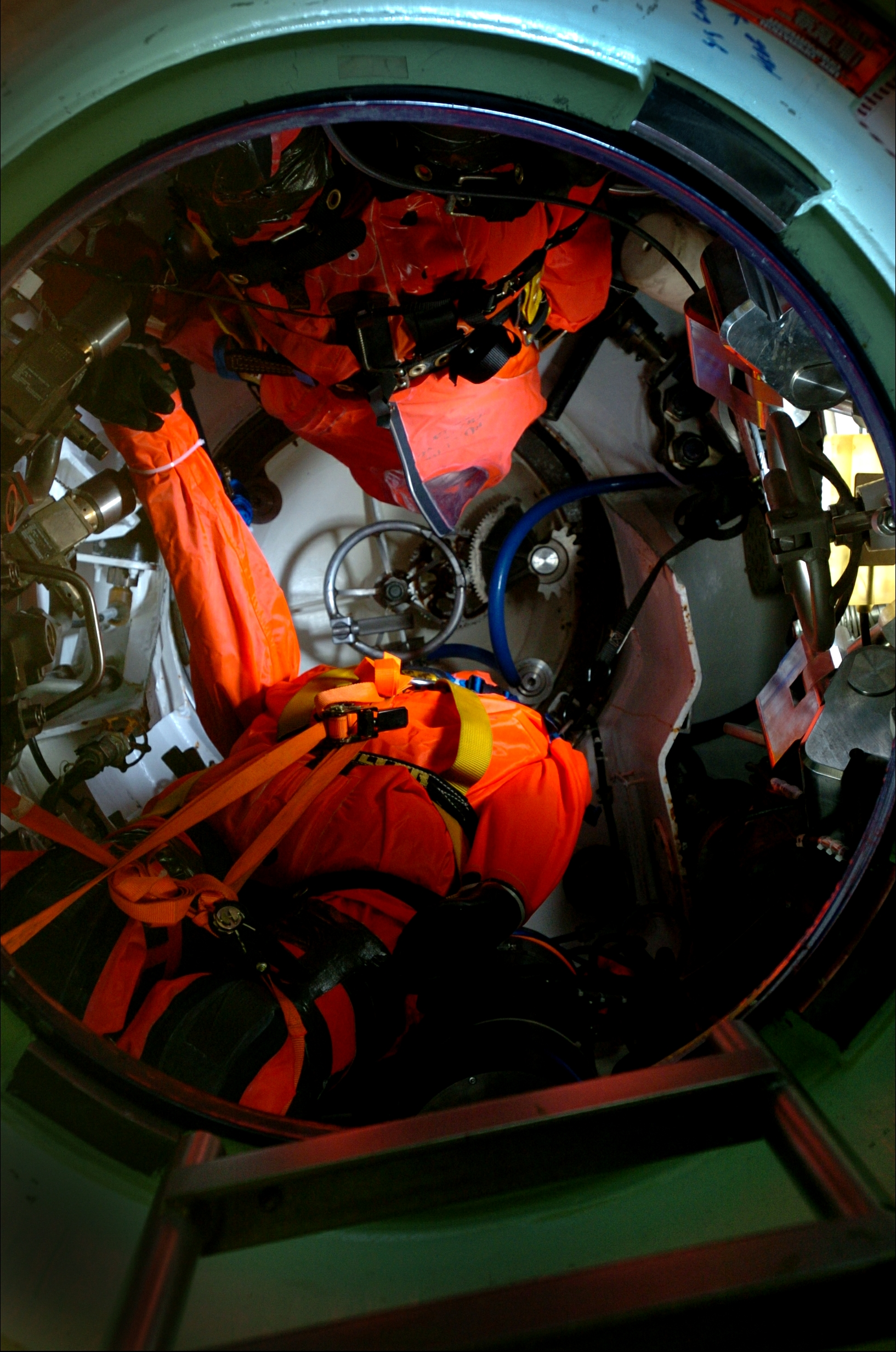
View inside a submarine escape trunk, looking up from below the lower hatch

An escape trunk is a small compartment on a submarine which provides a means for crew to escape from a downed submarine; it operates on a principle similar to an airlock, in that it allows the transfer of persons or objects between two areas of different pressure.

== Principle of operation ==
The water pressure on the outer hatch is always greater than the air pressure inside the submarine, which prevents opening the hatch. Only when the pressure inside the escape chamber is equal to the sea pressure can the hatch be opened. Thus the compartment must be sealed off from the interior of the submarine and the pressure inside the chamber must be raised to sea pressure in order to make it possible to open the escape hatch.

== Operation ==
1. The drain valve is opened to ensure any residual water is drained from the compartment, and the pressure between the interior of the submarine and the escape trunk is equalized.
2. The drain valve is closed, 6–8 people climb up through the lower hatch into the escape chamber, and the lower hatch is shut. Before climbing into the chamber, the escapees don a Steinke hood or Submarine Escape Immersion Equipment, which will provide an air supply during the ascent to the surface.
3. The seawater valve is opened to flood the chamber. As the chamber floods, the air in the chamber is compressed until its pressure is equal to the sea pressure. When the pressure in the chamber is equalized with the sea pressure, the flooding of the chamber will stop. The water level must rise above the level of the escape tube (see diagram). Additional air is vented into the chamber from the high pressure air supply to raise the air pressure. A bubble of air at the top of the chamber remains for the persons inside to breathe while awaiting their turns to exit the chamber.
4. The first escapee's Steinke hood is filled with air from a hose attached to the high pressure air line before departing. Pressure in the hood must be equalized with ambient air/water pressure. The first escapee climbs up through the escape tube and pushes the hatch open. The hatch could not have been opened until the interior pressure of the chamber was equalized with sea pressure. Once outside the chamber, the buoyancy of the air inside the Steinke hood will quickly carry the escapee to the surface. As the person rises to the surface, the ambient water pressure decreases and thus the air in the person's lungs and in hood expands. The hood contains enough air for the escapee to breathe normally through the ascent.
5. One by one, each escapee's Steinke hood is filled with air and the person climbs out the escape tube and rises to the surface. The last person out must push the outer hatch shut before departing.
6. Inside the submarine, the drain valve is opened to drain the water from the chamber and equalize the pressure to that within the submarine. The pressure inside the chamber will quickly force all water from the chamber out the drain valve. Lowering the pressure inside the chamber will also force the outer hatch shut again because of greater sea pressure outside the submarine. Then the cycle begins again until everyone has left the submarine.

== DSRV rescue ==
The escape trunk can also be used for the rescue of a crew inside a disabled submarine using a Deep Submergence Rescue Vehicle (DSRV). The crew of the DSRV will maneuver the vessel above the upper hatch of the escape trunk and then latch on to the submarine using the built-in eyes on the outer hull of the submarine. Most submarines do not have the built-in eyes and rely on the DSRV establishing a watertight seal on the area surrounding the hatch. Once the sub has settled on the correct location the skirt is pumped out and the hydrostatic pressure on the exterior of the skirt is enough to maintain the seal when the hatches are opened and the transfer undertaken. The crew can then quickly equalize the pressure in the small chamber between the DSRV and the submarine and open their own lower hatch.

On the outside of the upper hatch of the escape trunk is often a shaft connected to the wheel that operates the locking mechanism. The crew of the DSRV can attach a wheel to the shaft and turn the shaft to unlock the hatch, thus providing access to the interior of the submarine. This is a risky operation, as when a submarine has been damaged enough to sink, it is possible there was an ingress of water into the pressure hull raising the internal pressure above the normal 1 bar.

== See also ==
- USS Tang (SS-306)
- USS Archerfish (SS-311)
- BAP Pacocha (SS-48)
