= Cousteau =

Cousteau may refer to:

- Cousteau (band), a British band
- Jacques Cousteau Island or Cerralvo Island, a Mexican Island of the Baja California Sur
- Cousteau Rules, an escarpment on Pluto
- Cousteau, the fictional captain's yacht on the USS Enterprise-E in Star Trek

== People with the surname ==
- Alexandra Cousteau (born 1976), daughter of Philippe Cousteau Sr.
- Ashlan Gorse Cousteau, Philippe Cousteau Jr.'s wife
- Céline Cousteau (born 1972), daughter of Jean-Michel Cousteau
- Desireé Cousteau, pornographic actress
- Fabien Cousteau (born 1967), son of Jean-Michel Cousteau
- Jacques-Yves Cousteau (1910–1997), French marine explorer who invented the aqua-lung and pioneered marine conservation
- Jan Cousteau, Philippe Cousteau's wife
- Jean-Michel Cousteau (born 1938), eldest son of Jacques-Yves Cousteau
- Philippe Cousteau (a.k.a. Philippe Cousteau Sr.) (1940–1979), second son of Jacques-Yves Cousteau
- Philippe Cousteau Jr. (born 1980), son of Philippe Cousteau Sr.
- Pierre-Antoine Cousteau (1906–1958), French far-right polemicist and journalist, and brother of Jacques-Yves Cousteau
- Simone Melchior Cousteau, Jacques-Yves Cousteau's wife
