= Mission 31 =

Undersea expedition organized by Fabien Cousteau

Mission 31 was an undersea expedition organized by Fabien Cousteau. It was originally scheduled for November 2013, but was delayed to June 2014. On June 1, Cousteau and six crew members descended to the undersea laboratory Aquarius in the Florida Keys. Halfway through the expedition, three of crew were replaced, as had been planned. After 31 days, Cousteau and the crew ascended on July 2.

Throughout Mission 31, Cousteau's team conducted extended scuba diving expeditions to collect scientific data and IMAX footage. They hosted various one-day guests, conversed live with classrooms, and kept in touch with the outside world via social media. Cousteau estimated that his team collected the equivalent of two years' worth of surface dive data, enough for 10 scientific papers. Mission 31 was envisioned as a tribute to Cousteau's grandfather, Jacques Cousteau, who spent 30 days living underwater in 1963. Fabien Cousteau thus beat his grandfather's record for time spent underwater by a film crew by one day.

== Background ==
In 1963, French oceanographer and filmmaker Jacques Cousteau spent 30 days living underwater in Conshelf Two, in the Red Sea. The footage was turned into the Academy Award-winning film World Without Sun. Subsequently, his television show, The Undersea World of Jacques Cousteau, was seen by audiences around the world. Cousteau was one of the world's first advocates for governmental action in environmental protection and, by the time of his death in 1997, was one of the world's most famous television personalities.

Jacques Cousteau's grandson, Fabien Cousteau, organized Mission 31 as a tribute to his late grandfather. The mission had two goals — to gather scientific data and to raise funds for Aquarius, an underwater laboratory located at a depth of 63 feet (19 m) below the surface, about 9 miles (14 km) south of Key Largo. Aquarius is the world's only operating undersea laboratory. Measuring 43 feet (13 m) by 9 feet (2.7 m), it holds up to six people. It is pressurized, air conditioned, and has wireless Internet access. A typical mission lasts 10 days, with the longest previous mission lasting 18 days. Aquarius is owned by the United States government's National Oceanic and Atmospheric Administration and run by Florida International University.

Fabien Cousteau also hoped to break his grandfather's record for longest time spent underwater by a film crew, and draw the public's attention to environmental issues. According to Guinness World Records, the longest time anyone has spent underwater in a fixed environment at the time was 73 days 2 hours 34 minutes. This record was later broken in 2023 by Joseph Dituri.

== Mission ==
Fabien Cousteau got the idea for Mission 31 when visiting Aquarius during a fundraiser aiming to keep the laboratory operating in the wake of federal budget cuts. It was originally scheduled to take place in November 2013, fifty years after Jacques Cousteau's original mission. When the United States federal government shutdown in October 2013, Fabien Cousteau elected to postpone the mission until the spring of 2014.

On June 1, 2014, Cousteau and five team members dived down to Aquarius. Joining Cousteau for the entire 31-day expedition were habitat technicians Mark "Otter" Hulsbeck and Ryan LaPete. The other three crew members — Kip Evans, Andy Shantz, and Adam Zenone — were replaced according to plan midway through the mission by Matt Ferraro, Liz Magee, and Grace C. Young. The crew included researchers from Florida International University, Northeastern University, and Massachusetts Institute of Technology. For most of the crew, including Cousteau, it was their first saturation diving experience. Periodically, they were joined by "VIP guests" for a day, including Cousteau's father, Jean-Michel and sister Céline, actor Ian Somerhalder, and marine biologist Sylvia Earle. Rapper will.i.am and businessman-explorer Richard Branson were tentatively scheduled to visit had the expedition taking place in October 2013 as originally planned.

Days were spent diving to conduct experiments and gather data to study the effects of climate change and pollution on coral reefs, while the evenings were spent in Aquarius on lab work, relaxation and stress tests: Cousteau and his crew made themselves available for physiological and psychological tests to determine the effects of long-term living under the sea and without sunlight. The crew also appeared on Weather Channel broadcasts periodically. They used a sonar device that records a wide range of frequencies and a slow-motion camera to capture more thorough data and installed tiny probes, less than the width of a human hair, into the coral reef. Among the animals seen during the expedition were eels, mantis shrimp, octopus, plankton, porkfish, snook, sponges, spotted eagle rays, starfish, tarpon, and various reef sharks. The crew also observed an Atlantic goliath grouper attack a barracuda, a scene which Shantz described as "something I never imagined happening".

Mission 31 was broadcast live 24 hours a day via the Internet, although the cameras were occasionally turned off to give the divers some privacy. Filming was done with sonar cameras to avoid disturbing the underwater life with artificial light. Team members were able to conduct live lectures for students and interact with the public through social media. The team primarily ate "astronaut-type food", as the limited space did not allow for ordinary food. Early in the expedition, the air conditioning in Aquarius broke, leading to 95 °F (35 °C) temperatures at 95% humidity until it could be fixed.

As they were undergoing 16 hours of decompression before resurfacing, the Mission 31 crew watched World Without Sun.

== Funding ==
Mission 31 cost an estimated US$1.8 million. It was paid for through corporate sponsorship and private donations, including a crowdfunding campaign on Indiegogo. Swiss watchmaker Doxa sold a Mission-31 dive watch for $2,890, with 25% of the funds going to the expedition. Aquarius cost $15,000 a day to operate; the rest of the funds went to pay for equipment.

== Impact ==
By working out of Aquarius instead of diving from the surface, Mission 31 crew members were able to scuba dive up to nine hours without surfacing or undergoing decompression. They were thus able to collect substantially more data in the time frame than otherwise would have been possible. Additionally, they were able to observe creatures at night, which would not be possible ordinarily. Cousteau estimated his team had collected the equivalent of two years' worth of data during the mission, enough for ten scientific papers. Shantz said during his two weeks, 12 terabytes of data were collected. Additionally, equipment was installed to monitor ocean acidification.

According to Cousteau's PR team, around 330 million people heard about Mission 31 while it was taking place. Florida International dean Michael Heithaus remarked "Fabian has helped us reach out to millions of people that we wouldn't have been able to otherwise" and added "This is launching the age of Aquarius at FIU". An IMAX documentary film on the expedition is expected to be released within 18 months.
