= Shark: Mind of a Demon =

Shark: Mind of a Demon With Fabien Cousteau was a 2006 documentary/reality television special. The film was the result of an attempt by Fabien Cousteau to study the great white shark in its natural surroundings using a submarine shaped like a shark called Troy.

== Background ==
Typically, filmmakers throw large amounts of bait into the water to attract sharks for filming purposes, in a practicing knowing as chumming. Photographers are housed in protective shark cages while filming. The chum leads to aggressive behavior, and to enhance the footage, bait is pulled toward the cameraman in the cage. The result is captivating footage of open-mouthed sharks, but such footage does not represent typical shark behavior.

In an attempt to get more natural shark footage, Fabien Cousteau, grandson of famous oceanographer Jacques Cousteau, contracted with engineer Eddie Paul to build a shark-shape submarine named Troy. "I wanted to go beyond the cage," Fabien Cousteau explained, "go beyond that blind and intermingle with these animals as one of them." Sharks appeared to view Troy as another shark, allowing Cousteau to observe the animal in a more natural way.

== Film ==
Using Troy, Cousteau filmed about 170 hours of footage which was used to make a documentary called Shark: Mind of a Demon. Originally titled Demon of the Deep, the film was produced by Deep Blue Productions and aired on CBS on June 28, 2006. Susan Zirinsky was the executive producer.

Underwater footage was drawn primarily from Guadalupe Island, Mexico. Cousteau had originally planned to film in Australia as well, but budget constraints prevented it. The raw footage was also made available for scientific study.

=== Synopsis ===
Shark: Mind of a Demon has been described as "more reality show than documentary". It tracks the "problem-plagued" development and deployment of Troy, spanning two years of Cousteau's life. On multiple occasions the vessel stops functioning, leaving Cousteau stuck at the bottom of the sea. On one such occasion, he is cut off from his support staff and forced to swim to safety in the dark. On another occasion, Troy crashed and got pinned at the bottom of the sea. After some tense moments, Cousteau's dive team was eventually able to free it. The frequent problems lead to tensions between Cousteau and his support team, which included his sister Céline Cousteau. "I began thinking of Fabian pretty derogatory", says one crew member. "I didn't know whether he was trying to ride the laurels of his name."

== Reception ==
National Public Radio critic Andrew Wallenstein said he rarely enjoys watching shark footage, but found Mind of a Demon "absorbing" but "not quite for the reasons intended". He said he found the tensions between Cousteau and his crew to be "far more compelling" than the shark footage, and said he did not learn anything about sharks. "I'm not even sure what Cousteau's innovative approach actually yielded in terms of footage", Wallenstein concluded. "There's nothing in Mind of a Demon that uncovers the secret world of sharks."

Writing for The New York Post, Linda Stasi said Mind of a Demon started out promising, but ended up "as a self-indulgent vanity project." She called it a "dopey, if well-intentioned journey" and said the only interesting part was the dynamic between Cousteau and the support ship's captain. In contrast, Alex Strachan of Canwest News Service called Mind of a Demon "fun, entertaining and informative". Writing for USA Today, Robert Bianco called the show "impressive and frightening, if a bit odd".
