= Wonders of the Sea 3D =

2019 film directed by Jean-Michel Cousteau and Jean-Jacques Mantello

- Official release poster
- Directed by: Jean-Michel Cousteau; Jean-Jacques Mantello
- Written by: David Chocron
- Screenplay by: Francois Mantello; Jean-Jacques Mantello
- Produced by: François Mantello; Arnold Schwarzenegger
- Narrated by: Arnold Schwarzenegger
- Cinematography: Jean-Jacques Mantello; Gavin McKinney
- Edited by: Enzo Mantello
- Music by: Christophe Jacquelin
- Production companies: Myriad Pictures; 3D Entertainment
- Distributed by: Fathom Events
- Release dates: September 2017 (San Sebastian Film Festival); 17 January 2019 (US)
- Running time: 82 minutes
- Countries: United Kingdom; France
- Language: English

Wonders of the Sea 3D is a 2017 American documentary film co-directed by Jean-Michel Cousteau and narrated by Arnold Schwarzenegger.

== Background ==
Schwarzenegger expressed the hope that the film would do for marine conservation what the film Saturday Night Fever (1977) did for disco dancing, and what the film Pumping Iron (1977), in which Schwarzenegger starred, did for gym memberships. When the film was screened at the 2017 San Sebastián International Film Festival, Schwarzenegger argued

"Don’t ever ever buy into the idea that the environment ought to be a political issue.... there is no democrat or republican air, there is no democrat or republican water. We breath the same air and we drink the same water."

== Filming and casting ==
The documentary was filmed over three years in locations ranging from Fiji to the Bahamas.

The cast includes Céline Cousteau, Fabien Cousteau, and Jean-Michel Cousteau.

== Critical reviews ==
The film has been reviewed in US media that include Variety and The Hollywood Reporter. The film has also been reviewed in Canada by the Toronto Star, the National Post, The Globe and Mail, The Georgia Straight, Now Magazine, Original Cin, and What She Said, in Spain by El País, in the Philippines by the Philippine Daily Inquirer, and in Italy by Mymovies.it and Comingsoon.it.
