= Alexandra Cousteau =

French environmentalist and filmmaker

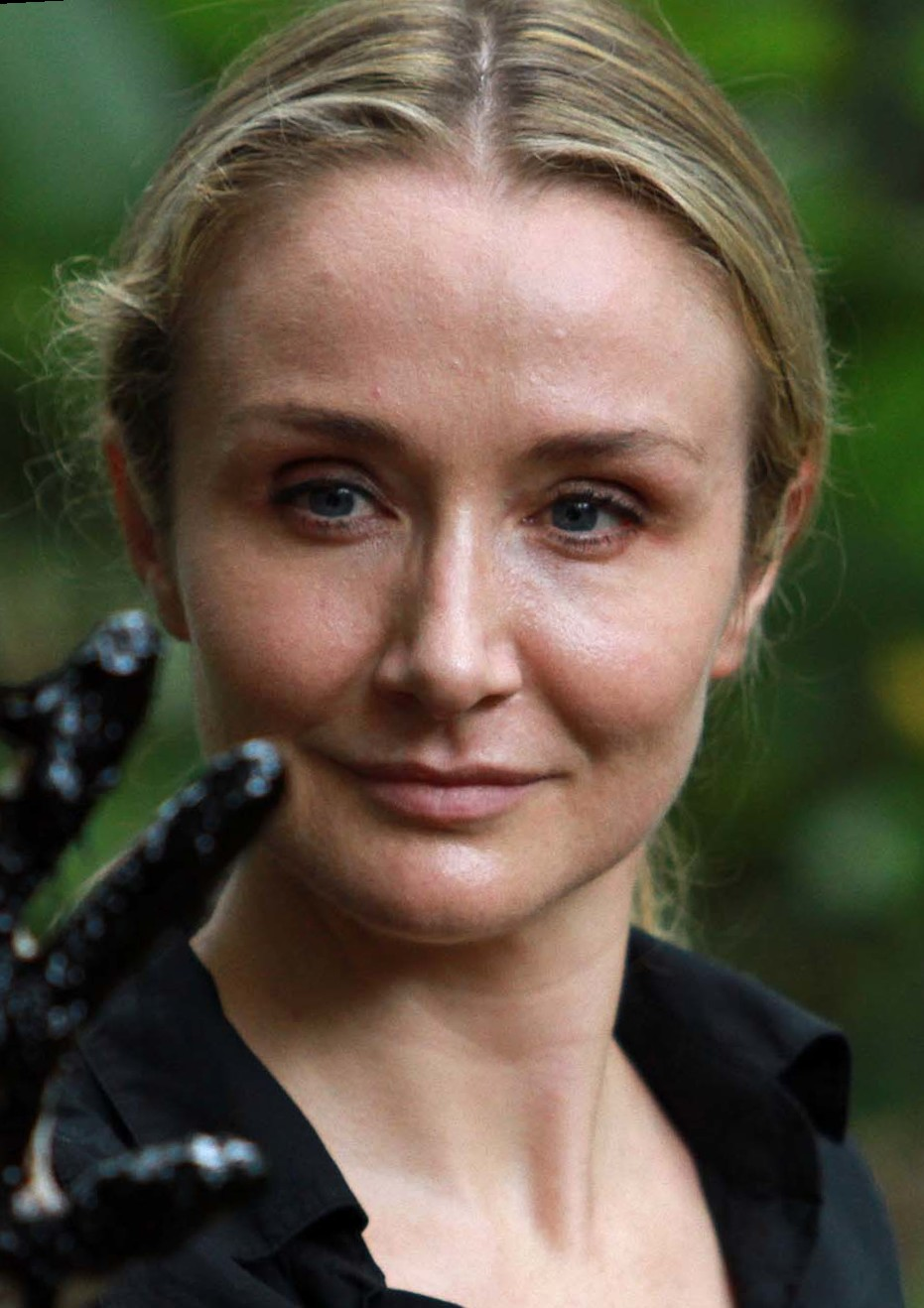
- Cousteau in 2013
- Born: Alexandra Marguerite Clémentine Cousteau; March 21, 1976 (age 50); Los Angeles County, California, U.S.
- Education: Georgetown University
- Known for: Environmental conservation
- Spouse: Fritz Neumeyer
- Children: 2
- Parent(s): Philippe Cousteau; Jan Cousteau
- Relatives: Philippe Cousteau Jr. (brother); Jacques-Yves Cousteau (grandfather); Simone Cousteau (grandmother); Jean-Michel Cousteau (uncle); Fabien Cousteau (cousin); Céline Cousteau (cousin); Pierre-Antoine Cousteau (great-uncle)

Alexandra Marguerite Clémentine Cousteau (born March 21, 1976) is a filmmaker, sustainability keynote speaker and an environmental activist. Cousteau continues the work of her grandfather Jacques-Yves Cousteau and father Philippe Cousteau. Cousteau advocates the importance of conservation, restoration and sustainable management of ocean and water resources for a healthy planet and productive societies.

== Personal life ==
Cousteau is the daughter of Philippe Cousteau and Jan Cousteau and the granddaughter of French explorer and filmmaker Jacques-Yves Cousteau and Simone Cousteau. She is a member of the third generation Cousteau family who explore and explain the natural world. At the age of four months, Cousteau first went on expedition with her father, Philippe Cousteau and learned to scuba dive with her grandfather, Jacques-Yves Cousteau, when she was seven.

== Education ==
Cousteau earned a bachelor's degree in political science (International Relations) from Georgetown College in 1998. In May 2016, she received an honorary degree of Doctor of Humane Letters from Georgetown University, her alma mater.

== Career ==
In 2000, Cousteau co-founded EarthEcho International with her mother Jan Cousteau and her brother Philippe Cousteau Jr.

From 2005 to 2007, Cousteau worked on ocean conservation issues in Central America as an advisor for MarViva.

In 2010, Cousteau led the Expedition Blue Planet: North America, across the U.S., Canada, and Mexico.

In 2014, she led an expedition to Canada in partnership with the Ottawa Riverkeeper and Aqua Hacking 2015, a conference focused on protecting the river. It's a joint initiative between Ottawa Riverkeeper, Alexandra Cousteau's Blue Legacy, and the de Gaspe Beaubien Foundation.

In 2018, Cousteau became a member of the advisory board of Neom, a planned cross-border city in northwestern Saudi Arabia developed by Saudi Crown Prince Mohammad bin Salman.

In 2019, she co-founded Oceans2050, where she currently serves as president. Oceans2050 is a project that advocates restoring ocean abundance by the year 2050.

Cousteau is an international speaker on sustainability, conservation and resilience to climate change.

== Advisory Board of Neom ==
In 2018, Cousteau became a member of the advisory board of Neom, a planned cross-border city in northwestern Saudi Arabia developed by Saudi Crown Prince Mohammad bin Salman.

In 2022, when asked about the city's planned nature reserves, Cousteau said, "I was fortunate enough to watch during the past five years on the board of Neom this principle of putting nature first [...] an extraordinary piece of leadership and an example to the rest of the world."

As of February 2026, Neom remains under construction, following significant reductions in scope.
