= The Undersea World of Jacques Cousteau =

Documentary television series about underwater marine life

The Undersea World of Jacques Cousteau is an American documentary television series about underwater marine life, directed by Alan Landsburg and hosted by French filmmaker, researcher, and marine explorer Jacques Cousteau. The first episodes of the series aired from 1968 until 1976. The English-language narration was by Richard Johnson (BBC version) and Rod Serling (ABC edition). It also featured his sons Jean‑Michel and Philippe, and his grandson Fabien. Jacques' wife, Simone Melchior, worked on board ship, and dived too, but she did not appear on-screen.

== Episodes ==
No.	Title	Original release date
Special	"Conshelf Adventure"	15 September 1966
Captain Cousteau introduces his first made-for-TV documentary, commissioned by ABC in 1966. The programme charts the ground-breaking Conshelf III project, an experimental underwater habitat based over 100m deep in the Mediterranean Sea. Six divers lived in the specially constructed base for three weeks, paving the way for the future development of saturation diving. The programme was so successful that a series was commissioned: the epic, decade-spanning odyssey of 'The Undersea World of Jacques Cousteau'.
1	"Sharks"	8 January 1968
Captain Cousteau and his ship the Calypso visit the Red Sea, the Indian Ocean and the Gulf of Aden in order to study shark behavior and to test methods of protecting shipwreck and air crash victims from shark attacks. Ichthyologist Dr. Eugenie Clark joins the Calypso crew to study shark behavior and test shark repellents.
2	"Savage World of the Coral Jungle"	6 March 1968
The team travels to the coral reefs of the Indian Ocean, an area teeming with animal and plant life, and where numerous complex relationships between different species are played out on a daily basis. Cousteau and his men find a well-ordered universe housing a highly complex community on the coral reef.
3	"Search in the Deep"	15 April 1968
The island of Europa, in the Mozambique Channel between Africa and Madagascar, is the foremost breeding ground of the mysterious sea turtle. The crew's cameras follow the turtles' mating rituals, the females' labored journey up the beach to lay their eggs, and the fight for the survival of the newly-hatched babies. The Calypso crew films the undersea mating dance and subsequent egg-laying of the sea turtle.
4	"Whales"	15 November 1968
The Calypso divers study finback, sperm and killer whales, monitoring their migratory habits by planting small tags in their skin. Captain Cousteau also recounts the romance and legend of the great whales. Cousteau and his crew implant tracking devices into whales off the coasts of Madagascar and California.
5	"The Unexpected Voyage of Pepito and Cristobal"	13 January 1969
Captain Cousteau and the crew of the Calypso take two young wild fur seals aboard off the Cape of Good Hope. During an Atlantic crossing, the men begin to establish a relationship of trust and friendship with the mammals.
6	"Sunken Treasure"	3 March 1969
The crew sets out on a treasure hunt to the Caribbean in search of the wreck of La Nuestra Senora de la Concepcion, a Spanish ship that sank over 300 years ago carrying more than $2m in silver and gold.
7	"The Legend of Lake Titicaca"	24 April 1969
The divers travel inland to Peru's Lake Titicaca, testing experimental techniques for diving at high altitude for the first time. Deep in the lake, they discover a unique species of frog whose lungs have atrophied like fish, they die when removed from the water. Cousteau's divers investigate the lake's legend of Inca treasure. The treasure proves to be illusory, but ancient pottery and a unique species of aquatic frog are found.
8	"The Desert Whales"	28 October 1969
The Calypso crew follows 35-ton California gray whales on their annual breeding migration. The crew of the Calypso studies the little-known California gray whale, as this once-endangered species embarks on its 5,000-mile annual breeding migration. The team observes the intimate relationships between these creatures, including mating and the feeding of a baby gray.
9	"The Night of the Squid"	16 January 1970
The crew observes as 20 million squids amass in coastal waters to mate, spawn and die. In the waters off southern California the Calypso happens upon the savage, yet touching, spawning ritual of the sea arrow squids of the Pacific. From their exotic mating dance to the microscopic battle for survival of the newly-hatched young, the entire cycle is captured on film by the crew.
10	"Return of the Sea Elephant"	8 February 1970
Cousteau and his team study the life and death of the sea elephant, a massive sea mammal which returns each year to the small island of Guadalupe for ritual combat, mating, and breeding. Finally, the divers discover the sea elephants' secret graveyard, 25 fathoms below the waves. The crew studies the massive creatures as they mate and nurse on Guadalupe.
11	"Those Incredible Diving Machines"	10 March 1970
The history of underwater exploration is traced from the days of Alexander the Great to the development of the aqualung in 1942, the first bathyscaphe in 1948, the diving saucer in 1959, through to a new fleet of modern deep sea submersibles. A photographic essay traces man's endeavors and advances in undersea exploration.
12	"The Water Planet"	28 March 1970
After more than 140,000 nautical miles traveled aboard the Calypso, and having shot around two million feet of film, Cousteau shares his personal thoughts on the challenges they face filming the infinite phenomena of the water planet. Cousteau presents a behind-the-scenes look at the motivations and challenges driving his crew.
13	"Tragedy of the Red Salmon"	24 November 1970
The Cousteau team follows the spawning migration of the red sockeye salmon from the open sea to the Alaskan waters of their birth, up the Salmon River to remote Fraser Lake.
14	"Lagoon of Lost Ships"	14 May 1971
Truk lagoon in the South Pacific, the site of a fierce battle during WWII, is now home to around 50 sunken Japanese vessels. The crew explores the Pacific lagoon to learn how marine life adapts to foreign matter. The divers discover an uncharted sunken freighter, complete with the skeletons of its long-dead crew.
15	"The Dragons of Galapagos"	24 February 1971
The crew journey to the Galapagos Islands to study the marine iguana, a mysterious dragon-like creature that has reversed the course of evolution and returned to the sea for food and survival.
16	"Secrets of the Sunken Caves"	19 March 1971
The strange geological phenomenon of 'blue holes' is investigated by Captain Cousteau and his team, as they discover an undersea 'cathedral' one hundred feet below the surface.
17	"The Unsinkable Sea Otter"	26 September 1971
In the North Aleutian Islands, Cousteau and his crew observe the rough courtship and tender mating of the sea otter, before continuing to Monterey where the otter's existence is being threatened by man-made hazards such as pollution and illegal hunting.
18	"The Forgotten Mermaids"	21 December 1971
The crew travels to the cypress glades of East Florida to film the manatee, a vegetarian creature of the sea whose closest living relative is the elephant. Learning of the plight of 'Sewer Sam', a manatee trapped in the sewers of Miami, the team attempts to help return Sam to the river.
19	"Octopus, Octopus"	24 January 1972
The crew studies the eight-armed octopus's life cycle and ongoing evolutionary process.
20	"A Sound of Dolphins"	25 February 1972
The crew isolates a pair of dolphins to study the species' remarkable sonar system.
21	"500 Million Years Beneath the Sea"	11 January 1973
The crew dives at night to observe the Nautilus — a living marine fossil.
22	"The Smile of the Walrus"	5 November 1972
The crew films the walrus lolling on Arctic ice floes and swimming in the frigid sea.
23	"Hippo!"	16 February 1973
The crew swims among crocodiles to capture the quick-tempered hippo in action beneath the water.
24	"The Singing Whale"	12 March 1973
The Calypso crew records the plaintive, melodious songs of migrating humpback whales.
25	"South to Fire and Ice"	29 November 1973
The crew climbs glaciers, examines whale bones and watches a volcano.
26	"The Flight of Penguins"	21 January 1974
The crew observes penguins feeding, mating and raising young.
27	"Beneath the Frozen World"	3 March 1974
The crew dives below the ice, and sails above in a hot-air balloon.
28	"Blizzard at Hope Bay"	22 March 1974
The disabled Calypso becomes trapped during a three-day blizzard.
29	"Life at the End of the World"	14 November 1974
The Calypso sails to Tierra del Fuego to film the disappearing Qawashqar Indians.
30	"Beavers of the North Country"	6 January 1975
Underwater cameras capture beavers at work and resting in their dams during winter.
31	"The Coral Divers of Corsica"	21 February 1975
Cousteau studies the rapidly disappearing red-coral forests of the Mediterranean Sea.
32	"The Sleeping Sharks of Yucatan"	6 April 1975
Cousteau investigates reports of sharks seen resting in underwater caves.
33	"The Sea Birds of Isabela"	8 December 1975
The crew journeys off the coast of Mexico to Isla Isabela to study tropical birds.
34	"Mysteries of the Hidden Reefs"	5 April 1976
Cousteau explores the beauty and life of an ancient and complex ecosystem.
35	"The Fish That Swallowed Jonah"	23 May 1976
Calypso's divers search Mexico's Yucatan Peninsula for different species of groupers.
36	"The Incredible March of the Spiny Lobsters"	30 May 1976
Lobsters gather annually at Mexico's Yucatan Peninsula for a migratory journey.
