= Philippe Cousteau Jr. =

American environmental conservationist

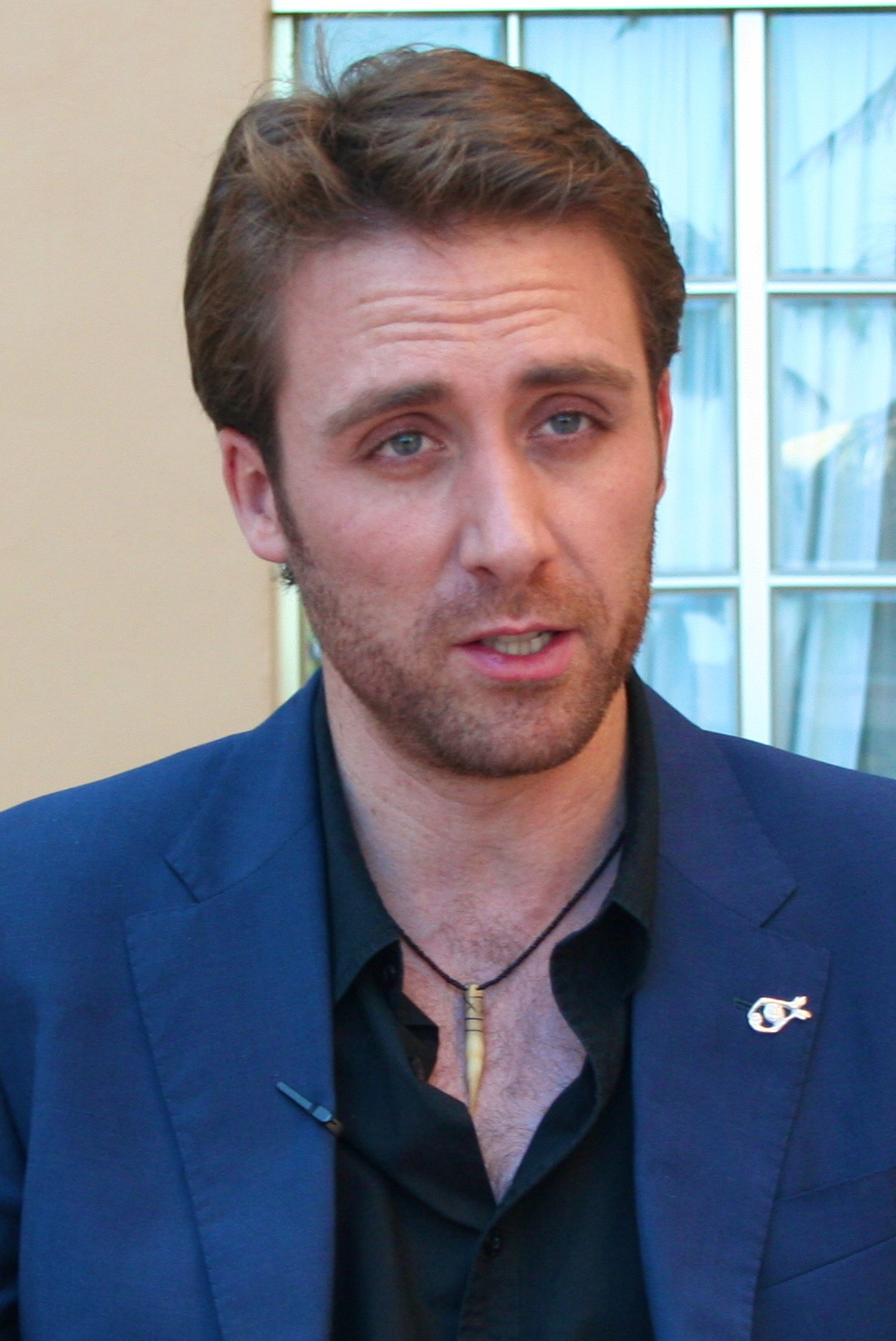
- Cousteau in 2010
- Born: Philippe-Pierre Jacques-Yves Arnault Cousteau Jr. January 20, 1980 (age 46); Santa Monica, California, U.S.
- Citizenship: France • United States
- Education: University of St Andrews (M.A.)
- Occupations: Environmental advocate, author, speaker, TV host
- Spouse: Ashlan Gorse Cousteau (m. 2013)
- Children: 2
- Parent(s): Philippe Cousteau; Jan Cousteau
- Relatives: Alexandra Cousteau (sister); Jacques Cousteau (grandfather); Simone Melchior (grandmother); Jean-Michel Cousteau (uncle); Fabien Cousteau (cousin); Céline Cousteau (cousin); Pierre-Antoine Cousteau (great-uncle)

Philippe-Pierre Jacques-Yves Arnault Cousteau Jr. (born January 20, 1980) is a French-American oceanographer and environmental activist, the son of Philippe Cousteau and the grandson of Jacques Cousteau. Cousteau has continued the work of his father and grandfather by educating the public about environmental and conservation issues. In 2017, he received an Emmy nomination for hosting the syndicated science series Awesome Planet.

== Early life ==
Philippe Cousteau Jr. was born in Santa Monica, California, in 1980 to Jan Cousteau, the widow of Philippe Cousteau, who was killed in a plane crash six months before the birth; he is the grandson of Jacques-Yves Cousteau. Cousteau grew up in France and the United States. He attended high school at St. George's School in Middletown, Rhode Island, and later graduated from St. Andrews University in the United Kingdom where he earned a Master of Arts in history.

== Career ==
In 2000, he co-founded EarthEcho International (originally called the Philippe Cousteau Foundation in honor of his father) with his mother Jan Cousteau and his sister Alexandra Cousteau. EarthEcho International is based in Washington, D.C., and its mission is to "empower youth to take action that protects and restores our water planet." His role within EarthEcho involves meeting young people who act for the protection of nature by cleaning up rivers, or organizing conferences, protecting species in the Sea of Cortes, or any positive action in favor of biodiversity, giving them the means to continue their actions.

In order to drive youth engagement, the organization is driven by their Youth Leadership Council, equipping 10-20 young members from around the world to get involved with the operations of EarthEcho and drive conservation efforts within their communities. EarthEcho collaborates with youth around the world to provide knowledge and develop tools that drive meaningful environmental action to protect and restore the ocean planet. Reaching more than 2 million people in 146 countries, the organization supports the next generation to become environmental leaders who will transform the future.

On September 4, 2006, he and Steve Irwin were filming for Ocean's Deadliest when a stingray barb pierced Irwin's chest, killing him. He later filmed the remainder of the series.

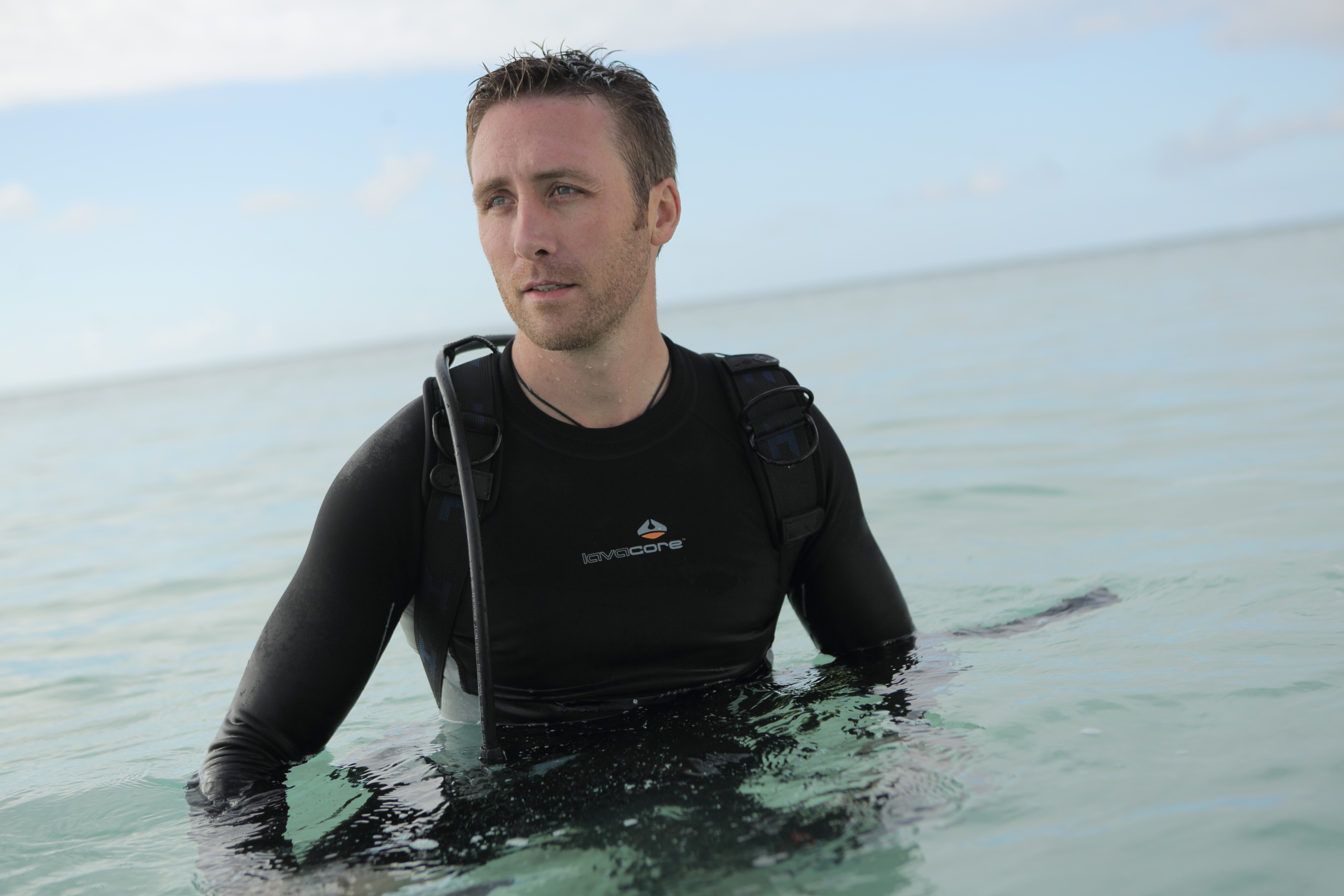
Cousteau on the Great Barrier Reef in 2012

In 2007, he co-founded Azure Worldwide, an environmental consulting, development, marketing and media company which was the successor to his earlier for-profit venture, Thalassa Ventures Corporation.

In May 2012, Cousteau and AdvisorShares launched an exchange-traded fund (ETF) called the AdvisorShares Global Echo ETF Exchange, focused on sustainable investing; the fund said it would donate a portion of its fund management fees to philanthropic projects around the world, including the Panzi Hospital in Eastern Congo (which focuses on the treatment and empowerment of women).

He has lectured at the UN, Harvard University and other institutions on environmental issues, and has served on the board of directors of the Ocean Conservancy, National Environmental Education Foundation and the Marine Conservation Institute. In January 2017, he gave a TED Talk at TEDx Pennsylvania Ave in Washington, DC.

== Television and media ==
From 2007 to 2009, Cousteau served as Chief Ocean Correspondent for Animal Planet, and appeared on Ocean's Deadliest and Springwatch. He has co-hosted a series called Oceans on BBC Two, and has served a correspondent on CNN and for the public radio show, Living on Earth.

In 2010, he spent a great deal of time covering the BP Oil Spill with ABC's Good Morning America and Sam Champion and later CNN. Cousteau was the first person to scuba dive on television into the spill.

From 2010 through 2014 Cousteau was a Special Correspondent for CNN International and the host of Going Green, a series that explored critical conservation issues around the world. In addition, Cousteau hosted Expedition Sumatra for CNN in 2013, an 8-part series exploring the deforestation crisis in Sumatra, Indonesia.

Since 2014, Cousteau has been the host and executive producer of Xploration Awesome Planet, a series syndicated on FOX and Hulu. In 2015 he was nominated for a Daytime Emmy Award in the "Outstanding Lifestyle/ Travel/ Children's Series Host" category.

In 2015, Cousteau and his wife Ashlan traveled to Nepal to film wild Bengal tigers in partnership with the World Wildlife Fund and the Leonardo DiCaprio Foundation; this led to a series about the expedition entitled Treasures of the Terai which aired online at Takepart.com and KTLA.

In 2016, Ashlan and Philippe produced and co-starred in an hour-long documentary for Discovery Channel's Shark Week called Nuclear Sharks, which looked at how grey reef sharks in Bikini Atoll were able to recover from nuclear testing in the 1940s and 50s.

Philippe and his wife Ashlan Gorse Cousteau co-starred in the Travel Channel series Caribbean Pirate Treasure. The show won the Cynopsis TV Award for the best adventure reality series after its first season.

== Personal life ==
Cousteau married entertainment journalist Ashlan Gorse on September 25, 2013, in a civil ceremony at the City Hall of the 8th arrondissement in Paris, and had a second ceremony on September 28, 2013, at the Château d'Esclimont in Saint-Symphorien-le-Château. They have two daughters born in 2019 and 2021.

== Books ==
- Going Blue: A Teen Guide to Saving Our Oceans, Lakes, Rivers, & Wetlands (2010). Minneapolis: Free Spirit. ISBN 1-575-42348-0
- Making A Splash: A Kid's Guide to Protecting Our Oceans, Lakes, Rivers & Wetlands (2013). Minneapolis: Free Spirit. ISBN 1-575-42417-7
- Really? Ocean (2016). New York: Scholastic Books. ISBN 0-545-80650-X
- Follow the Moon Home: A Tale of One Idea, Twenty Kids, and A Hundred Sea Turtles (2016). San Francisco: Chronicle Books. ISBN 1-452-11241-X
- The Endangereds 1 (2020). New York: Harper. ISBN 0-062-89416-1
- The Endangereds 2: Melting Point (2021). New York: Harper. ISBN 0-062-89419-6
- Oceans For Dummies (2021). Hoboken: John Wiley & Sons. ISBN 1-119-65443-2
