= Exploring the Reef with Jean-Michel Cousteau =

- Directed by: Roger Gould
- Written by: Roger Gould; Bob Peterson; Jeff Pidgeon
- Produced by: Osnat Shurer
- Starring: Jean-Michel Cousteau; Albert Brooks (voice); Ellen DeGeneres (voice); Alexander Gould (voice)
- Edited by: Steve Bloom; Katherine Ringgold
- Music by: Todd Boekelheide; Joshua Hollander
- Production companies: Walt Disney Pictures; Ocean Futures Society
- Distributed by: Buena Vista Home Entertainment
- Release date: November 4, 2003
- Running time: 7 minutes
- Country: United States
- Language: English

Exploring the Reef with Jean-Michel Cousteau (also simply referred to as Exploring the Reef) is a live-action/animated short documentary film included on the fullscreen version of disc 2 of the Finding Nemo 2-Disc Collector's Edition DVD, which was released on November 4, 2003. It features Jean-Michel Cousteau in a documentary film he is trying to make about coral reefs, but Marlin (Albert Brooks), Dory (Ellen DeGeneres) and Nemo (Alexander Gould) interrupt him.

== Plot ==
Jean-Michel Cousteau, Jacques Cousteau's son, is narrating about coral reefs. While he is talking, the regal blue tang fish, Dory, starts bothering him by entering the frame. The scene then cuts to an anemone that the two clownfishes, Nemo and his father, Marlin, come out of and Mr. Cousteau sighs for not being able to do his documentary. The scene cuts to real cuttlefishes, which Dory tries to speak to. When Mr. Cousteau tells Dory to stop, the scene cuts to a live Spanish dancer. This makes Marlin think of dancing and soon all three animated fish are dancing to some music. This infuriates Mr. Cousteau so much that he screams "STOP!" and proceeds to make a quick rant about the water cycle, concluding that "Everyone, everywhere, affects the ocean!". Dory expresses amazement and at first, Mr. Cousteau is satisfied, but when it is revealed that she was hearing the echo inside a conch shell, Mr. Cousteau loses his temper and starts screaming at Dory to stop disturbing him in French, causing Dory to drop her conch, but she catches it. For about six seconds, a cartoon still image of Mr. Cousteau shrugging in a swimming suit appears while Musak-style music plays on a title card which reads "Please Stand By".

When Mr. Cousteau comes back, however, he has calmed down and talks with the three fish about coral that have suffered from coral bleaching, while the whitened coral appears on screen. The next topic is coral reproduction. Dory frantically swims to every new egg to say "Happy Birthday", Marlin paternally covers Nemo's eyes and Mr. Cousteau talks about how there are so many eggs, that even the hungriest fish cannot possibly eat all of them. He concludes by talking all about how we must all work hard in order to preserve the beauty of the coral reef. Suddenly, Nemo and the other two fish interrupt him again, inadvertently summarizing the message of the entire film during their talk. After they're done talking, Mr. Cousteau gets mad again and the camera cuts to him aboard his boat by night. Humiliated that he has been "Upstaged by fish", Mr. Cousteau mutters that "This would have never happened to Papa." In a before-credits scene, Nemo tells the viewers about Mr. Cousteau's website: oceanfutures.org.

== Cast ==
- Jean-Michel Cousteau — Himself
- Voice of Marlin — Albert Brooks
- Voice of Dory — Ellen DeGeneres
- Voice of Nemo — Alexander Gould
