= Ashlan Gorse Cousteau =

American conservationist (born 1980)

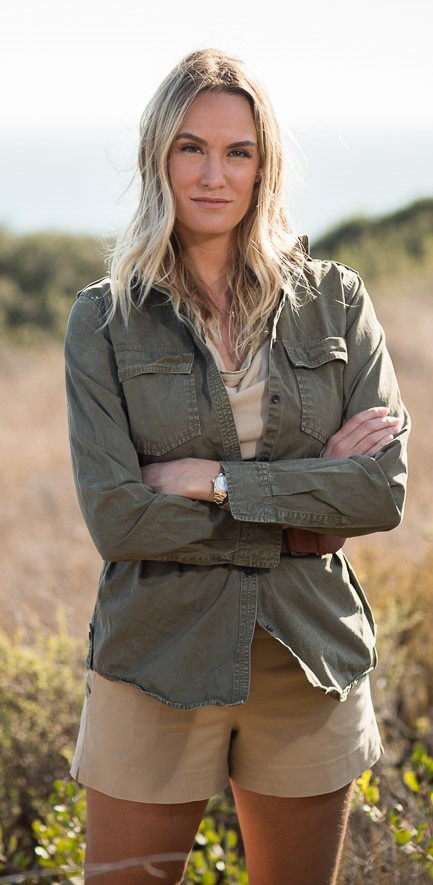
- Born: Ashlan McKain Gorse; December 14, 1980 (age 45); North Carolina, U.S.
- Occupations: Conservationist; entertainment journalist
- Spouse: Philippe Cousteau, Jr. (m. 2013)
- Children: 2

Ashlan Gorse Cousteau (born Ashlan McKain Gorse; December 14, 1980) is an American conservationist and former entertainment journalist. Throughout her journalism career, she worked for E! News, Discovery Channel, and Travel Channel.

With her husband Philippe Cousteau Jr., she has since produced and appeared in several educational and environmental television programs.

== Biography ==
When Gorse was seven, the 1988 Raleigh tornado destroyed her home.

Gorse graduated from the University of North Carolina at Chapel Hill's School of Journalism with a BA in broadcasting and a minor in music.

She began her professional career in the exclusive NBC page program in New York City. She has worked on shows such as Saturday Night Live, The Today Show and Late Night with Conan O'Brien. She worked for Access Hollywood in Manhattan, going from production assistant to field producer before continuing on to MSNBC as a reporter and segment producer for its weekend entertainment shows, Hot List and At the Movies. She was a coach for MTV's Made.

In 2006, she moved to Los Angeles as the editor at large for Life & Style magazine and has since appeared on The O'Reilly Factor, The Today Show, the CBS Early Show, CNN, TV Guide and The Insider as a pop-culture and gossip guru. She was hired as a main anchor for E! News Now in 2007, was promoted to correspondent and fill-in anchor for E News in 2008, and left the network in June 2013. She has covered the Oscars, Emmys, Golden Globes and Grammys, and has interviewed Meryl Streep, Brad Pitt, Jennifer Aniston, Robert Downey Jr. and many others.

In 2014, Gorse and her husband Philippe Cousteau Jr. led an expedition to the San Juan Islands to film and raise awareness for the Southern Resident Orca Pod. The following year, they traveled to Nepal to film wild Bengal tigers in partnership with the World Wildlife Fund and the Leonardo DiCaprio Foundation; this led to a series about the expedition entitled Treasures of the Terai which aired online at Takepart.com and KTLA.

Beginning in 2015, billed as Ashlan Cousteau, she served as a correspondent for CBS's Entertainment Tonight, a role she continued in until 2017.

In 2016, the Cousteaus produced and co-starred in an hour-long documentary for Discovery Channel's Shark Week called Nuclear Sharks, which looked at how grey reef sharks in Bikini Atoll were able to recover from nuclear testing in the 1940s and 50s.

In January 2017, Cousteau gave a TEDx Talk in Antarctica titled Laugh, Cry, Connect: How Entertainment Can Save Our Planet from New Zealand's Antarctica research station, Scott Base. Also in 2017, she and Philippe Cousteau began co-starring in a series on Travel Channel called Caribbean Pirate Treasure, which won the Cynopsis TV Award for the best adventure reality series. The show's second season will air Summer 2018.

== Personal life ==
Gorse got engaged to Philippe Cousteau Jr., her boyfriend of two years, in Paris in October 2012. The couple met in 2010 at an environmental event where Cousteau was giving a speech. They married on September 25, 2013, in a civil ceremony at the City Hall of the 8th arrondissement in Paris and had a second ceremony on September 28, 2013, at the Château d'Esclimont in Saint-Symphorien-le-Château.

Cousteau gave birth to their first child, a daughter, in May 2019. Their second daughter was born in 2021.
