= Troy (submarine) =

Troy was a submarine designed by oceanographer Fabien Cousteau and engineer Eddie Paul to look like a great white shark.

== Submarine ==
Troy was a 14-foot-long (4.3 m), 1,200-pound (540 kg) submarine designed to look like a great white shark. It was created by oceanographer Fabien Cousteau and engineer Eddie Paul's E.P. Industries so that Cousteau could observe and film sharks in their natural habitat without chumming the water. The submarine had space for one person, Cousteau, who piloted the vehicle while lying on his stomach, propped up on his elbows. A wet sub, Troy was filled with water while operating. To breathe, Cousteau carried full diving gear weighing about 80 pounds (36 kg), providing about 6.5 hours of air. To prevent air bubbles leaving the vessel, spent air was redirected into two empty tanks.

Troy was covered in SkinFlex fabric combined with glass and sand to make it look and feel like shark skin. The "skin" was sewn together on the top and held together with Velcro on the bottom. Under that was a layer of bullet-proof Lexan and 2-inch-thick (5.1 cm) steel "ribs" to allow the submarine to survive a shark attack. The spine was made out of flexible plastic. Scars and epoxy teeth were added for realism.

Troy was designed to move in a shark-like manner using a series of joysticks to control speed, direction, and pitch. The eyes could roll, the gills puffed, and the mouth opened and closed to enable shark-like communication. Its tail functioned as a rudder and was powered by compressed air. The submarine could move forward at up to 5 knots, but was unable to react quickly. Depth was controlled by three inflatable buoyancy bags. Unlike real sharks, Troy was odorless.

Troy had three cameras to film its surroundings. Originally, cameras were positioned in the shark's eyes but the resulting images were too "disconcerting to try to make sense of" in real time, so the camera was moved to the top of the shark's head, disguised as a fish. An infrared camera was hidden in a suckerfish attached to the shark's body. The pilot had a video monitor showing him what was going on outside the shark.

Originally Troy had a $100,000 budget and two-month time frame. After a year of trial and error in Paul's workshop and pool, the submarine was finally ready for open water testing. Due, in part, to simultaneous documentary filming, overtime payments accumulated and the vessel ended up costing $200,000. It was originally named "Sushi".

Normally, sharks' behavior is affected by the attempts to observe them, with chumming and shark cages leading to footage of aggressive, open mouthed sharks that does not represent their natural behavior. Troy thus allowed Cousteau to observe the animal in more natural way. "You must 'become' one of them ... to witness what sharks do amongst themselves naturally", Cousteau remarked. "By better understanding them we can take one more step towards eliminating the demon image we have created in our minds."

After some initial apprehension, sharks appeared to view Troy as another shark. They stayed about 23 to 29 feet (7.0 to 8.8 m) away from it, the length of an adult shark, and rolled their eyes, puffed their gills, and changed directions in response to it. These behaviors were observed only in the presence of the shark, not with free divers. Based on the behavior, Cousteau said it appeared Troy was accepted as a dominant female by other great white sharks, but added that he was hesitant to say the behavior proved the sharks saw the submarine as a shark.

== Inspiration ==
Troy was inspired by The Adventures of Tintin comic Red Rackham's Treasure (French: Le Trésor de Rackham le Rouge) in which Tintin uses a shark-like submarine as part of his search for the titular treasure. Unlike in Troy, Professor Calculus' design from the comic has the driver sit upright. Cousteau first read the comic at age seven.

Troy, whose name derived from the idea of a "Trojan horse", was often described as the "Trojan shark".

== Impact ==
Troy attracted a great deal of international media attention. It was featured in Australia's Sunday Telegraph and Sun Herald, and the United Kingdom's Daily Telegraph and The Independent, among other publications. In the United States, National Geographic and The New York Times were among dozens of publications with lengthy articles about the submarine.

According to Cousteau, his crew was able to get good data on great white territorial boundaries using Troy.

=== Shark: Mind of a Demon ===
Troy was used to make a documentary to demonstrate that great white sharks were not mindless and dangerous animals. The documentary, named Shark: Mind of a Demon, was produced by Deep Blue Productions and aired on CBS. In total, Cousteau filmed about 170 hours of footage, which were also made available for scientific study.

The film tracked both Troy's development and its use in action. In the film, tensions run high between Cousteau and his crew as the vehicle frequently malfunctions. Film critic Andrew Wallenstein said the human drama of the film is compelling, but found it did not teach him much about sharks. Television critic Linda Stasi called it "a self-indulgent vanity project."
