= Philippe Cousteau =

French diver and cinematographer (1940–1979)

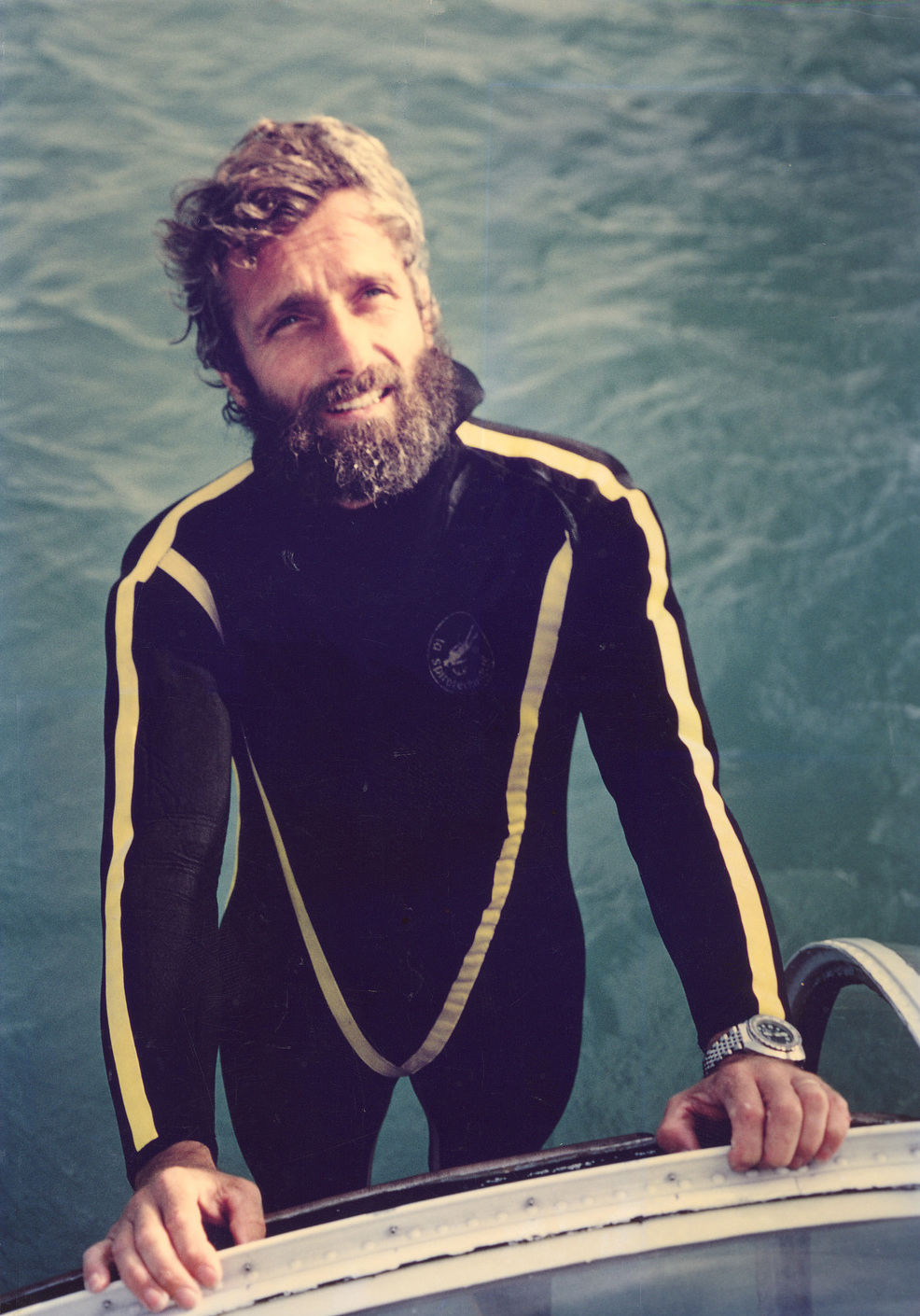
- Cousteau after a dive off the island of Isabella, near Mazatlán, Mexico, in 1975
- Born: Philippe-Pierre Cousteau; 30 December 1940; Toulon, France
- Died: 28 June 1979 (aged 38); Tagus River, Alverca, Portugal
- Spouse: Jan Cousteau (née Sullivan) (m. 1967)
- Children: Alexandra Cousteau; Philippe Cousteau Jr.
- Parent(s): Jacques Cousteau; Simone Melchior
- Relatives: Jean-Michel Cousteau (brother); Pierre-Antoine Cousteau (uncle); Fabien Cousteau (nephew); Céline Cousteau (niece)

Philippe Pierre Cousteau (30 December 1940 – 28 June 1979) was a French diver, sailor, pilot, photographer, author, director and cinematographer specializing in environmental issues, with a background in oceanography. He was the second son of Jacques Cousteau and Simone Melchior.

Cousteau was proficient filming from the air, on land and underwater. He was the lead cinematographer for most of the Cousteau films during his lifetime; he was nominated for and won several awards.

== Early life and education ==
Born in Toulon, Philippe Cousteau first dived with an aqua-lung in 1945 when he was 4 years old. His father brought home a miniature version of the aqua-lung he had co-invented a few years before. Though Philippe had not yet learned to swim, he followed his father into the water. Growing up, he spent each school vacation aboard his father's ship, RV Calypso.

As a teenager, he began to feel the drive to explore. While his father had pursued the horizon on the sea, Philippe Cousteau dreamed of pursuing horizons in the sky and began to study aerodynamics at the age of 16, flying first as a glider pilot, and then earning his airplane pilot license at a young age.

Cousteau spent two years in the French Navy during the Algerian war as a sonar operator and member of the landing party of the Le Normand ship, later earning his degree in science, spent another year at MIT, and then went to Paris to train in cinematography, graduating from I'École technique de photographie et de cinéma (now called École nationale supérieure Louis-Lumière) in Paris.

== Career ==
"Our goal was to serve as eyes for those who could not travel. We would be like knights errant who would travel the world, bringing their King tales of the Middle East. Except in our case, we would not be reporting to just one person but to millions."

— Philippe Cousteau

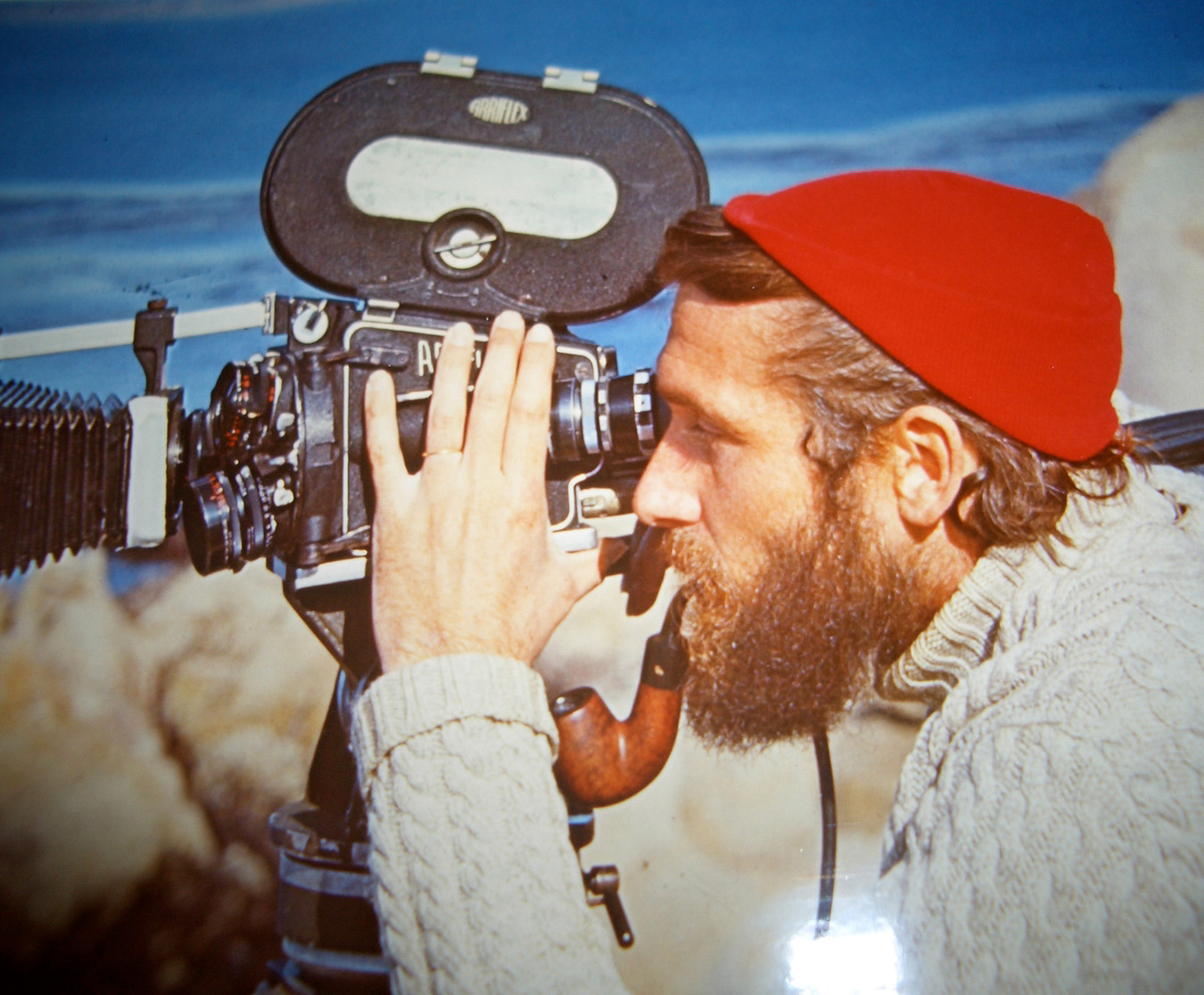
Cousteau filming during an expedition

In 1965, Cousteau was an Oceanaut on the Conshelf III, an undersea habitat for saturated diving down to 325 feet near Ile Levant in the Mediterranean Sea. In addition to his duties as Oceanaut, Cousteau was an underwater photographer and did all of the underwater filming, which became a National Geographic documentary film that aired in 1966.

Cousteau appeared as himself on the 28 March 1966 episode of the CBS game show To Tell the Truth. He received three of the four possible votes from the panel.

In February 1967, Cousteau accompanied his father on the RV Calypso for an expedition to film the sharks of the Red Sea and the Indian Ocean. As well as being the lead photographer for the expedition, Cousteau also chronicled his experiences in the 1970 publication The Shark: Splendid Savage of the Sea.

In 1969, Cousteau lent his technical expertise to the U.S. Navy's SEALAB program. In the aftermath of aquanaut Berry L. Cannon's death while attempting to repair a leak in SEALAB III, Cousteau volunteered to dive down to SEALAB and help return it to the surface, although SEALAB was ultimately salvaged in a less hazardous way.

Until his death in 1979, he co-produced numerous documentaries with his father, including Voyage to the Edge of the World (1976) for the cinema and his own PBS television series, Oasis in Space (1977), concerning environmental issues.

== Piloting ==
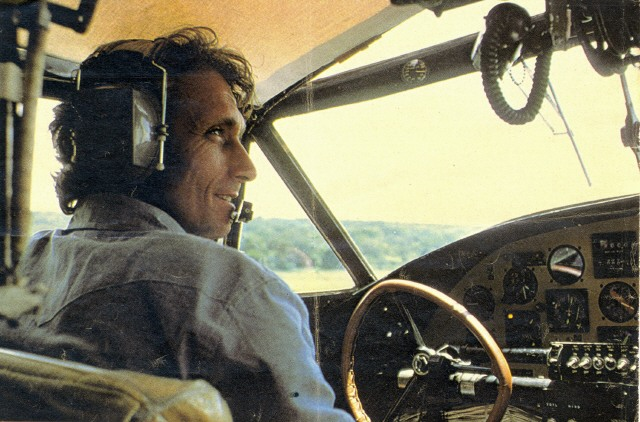
Cousteau piloting PBY, Lake Victoria, Uganda, July 1978

Cousteau was a highly experienced pilot. He earned his glider pilot license at the age of 16 and went on to obtain pilot credentials to fly balloons, hang gliders, single- and multi-engine airplanes and seaplanes, gyrocopters and helicopters.

He acquired a PBY Catalina seaplane in 1974. The amphibious aircraft was a converted U.S. Navy Catalina flying boat. Christened the Flying Calypso, the aircraft was in many of the Cousteau films and the home base for Cousteau's team.

== Personal life ==
Cousteau met Janice Sullivan in the crowded ballroom of St. Regis Hotel in New York City in February 1966. She was a fashion model originally from Los Angeles and more recently from New York. On 10 February 1967, they were married in Paris. Sullivan joined Cousteau on most of his father's expeditions (20 of 26 filming expeditions that spanned 13 years). They had two children, Alexandra Cousteau and Philippe Cousteau Jr.

== Death and legacy ==
Cousteau died in 1979, aged 38, when his PBY Catalina flying boat crashed in the Tagus river near Lisbon. The investigation of the accident was not thorough, and competing theories exist to the present day. One theory is that the aircraft simply touched down on the river too fast, causing it to flip on the water; another is that the aircraft nosed over during a high-speed taxi run undertaken to check the hull for leakage and the left wing broke free, sending its engine toward the cockpit and killing Cousteau instantly. Still another theory is that the aircraft, an amphibian with fully retractable landing gear, landed on the river with the landing gear extended. All others on board survived. His son Philippe Cousteau Jr. was born six months later.

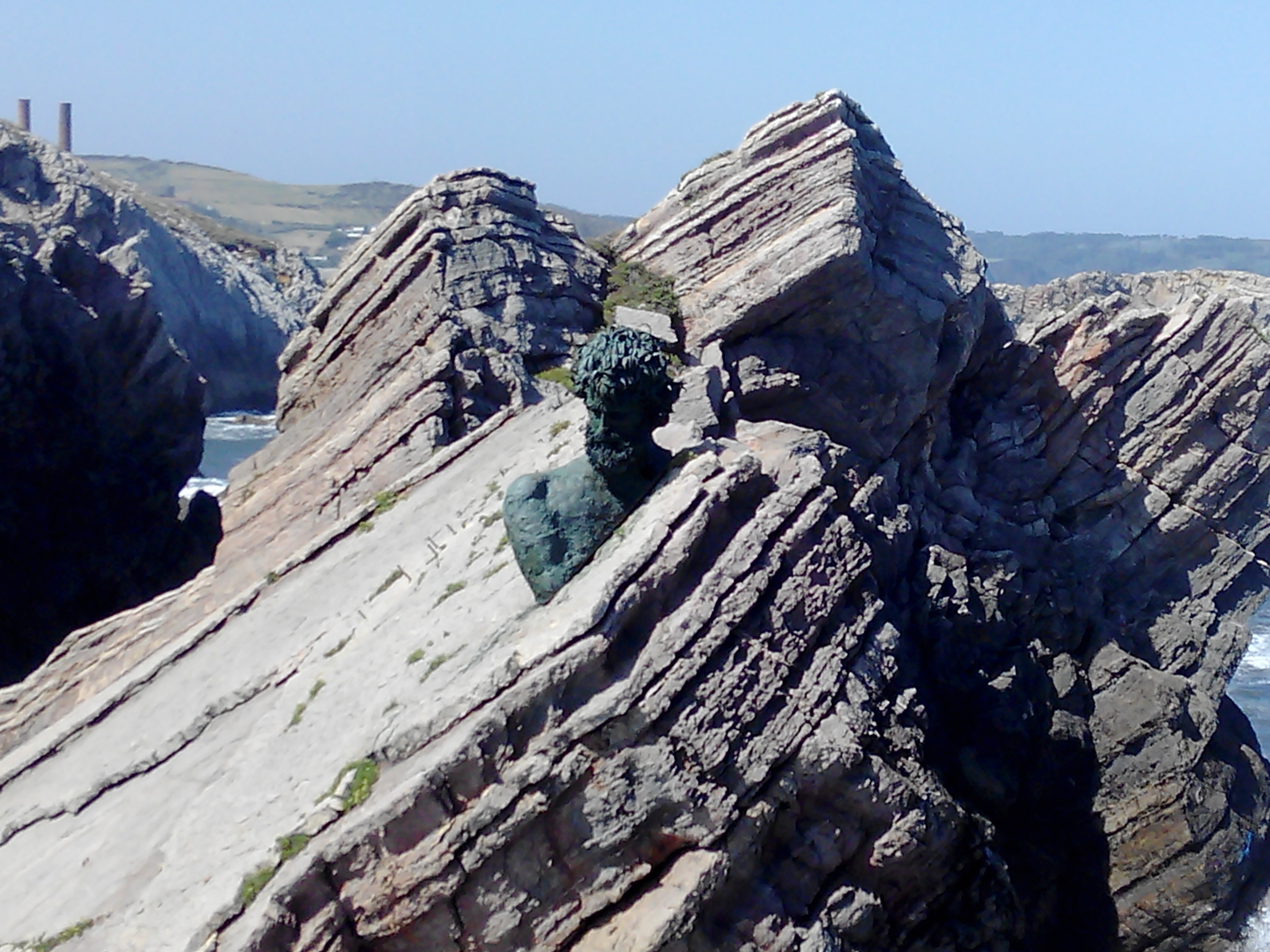
Bust of Cousteau in Salinas, Spain, close to the Philippe Cousteau Anchor Museum

The Philippe Cousteau Anchor Museum in Asturias, Spain, and The Lycée Philippe Cousteau in Saint-André-de-Cubzac, France, honor Cousteau's work.

His children Alexandra Cousteau and Philippe Cousteau Jr. continue the family work in oceanography as the co-founders of EarthEcho International.

== Awards ==
Cousteau received many awards and honors for his contribution to diving and underwater photography: He was nominated for four Emmy's, NOGI Award for Arts from the Underwater Society of America (now presented by The Academy of Underwater Arts and Sciences) (1977), World Wildlife Award and many others. His children's book Follow the Moon Home won the Green Book Award for picture books in 2017.
