= Joseph Dituri =

American biomedical researcher (born 1967)

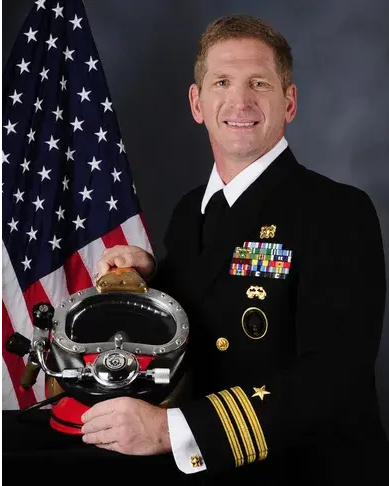
- CDR Dituri in 2013

Clinical Researcher Seeking the Truth

Personal details
- Born: December 8, 1967 (age 58) Oceanside, New York, U.S.
- Education: University of South Carolina (BS); Naval Postgraduate School (MS); University of South Florida (PhD)

Military service
- Branch/service: United States Navy
- Years of service: August 12, 1985 - May 1, 2013
- Rank: Commander (O5)

Joseph Dituri (born 8 December 1967) is an American biomedical researcher, and former Naval Commander. Also known as Dr. Deep Sea., his research includes life support equipment design, high carbon dioxide environments, hypobaric medicine, hyperbaric medicine, and traumatic brain injury. He has made contributions in the field as a researcher, speaker, lecturer, and writer, including Exploration and Mixed Gas Diving Encyclopedia: The Tao of Survival Underwater. He served as the Assistant Vice President for Veterans Clinical Research at the University of South Florida.

== Early life and education ==
In 1967, Dituri was born in Long Island, New York. After graduating from Lindenhurst Senior High School, he went on to obtain his B.S. in Computer Science at the University of South Carolina in 1995. He obtained his M.S. in Aeronautical Engineering from the Naval Postgraduate School in 2006. In 2018, he received his Ph.D. in Biomedical Engineering from the University of South Florida.

== Career ==
=== United States Navy ===
In 1985, Dituri enlisted in the United States Navy. He consistently served aboard naval vessels and at shore stations, engaging in tasks such as hyperbaric system maintenance, saturation diving, search and rescue operations, and ship repair. In 1995, he was commissioned into the Special Operations Officer pipeline and after serving three diving tours, he became the Engineering Duty Officer.

Upon completing his M.S. in 2006, he assumed the role of Officer-in-Charge at the Deep Submergence Unit (DSU) Diving Systems Detachment (DSD). Under his leadership, DSD certified the 2,000 feet sea water Atmospheric Diving System for deployment across the fleet. Following the implementation and initial testing phase, Commander Dituri's team introduced the Submarine Rescue Diving and Recompression System into Naval service, deploying it on two international engagements.

His final position in the United States Navy was in the Research Development and Acquisition Center – Maritime Systems at Special Operations Command. He served as the Chief Engineer, Program Manager for Undersea Systems Technical and Certification Program, as well as Deputy Program Manager for Combat Craft. After 28 years of active service, Dituri retired in 2013.

=== Researcher ===
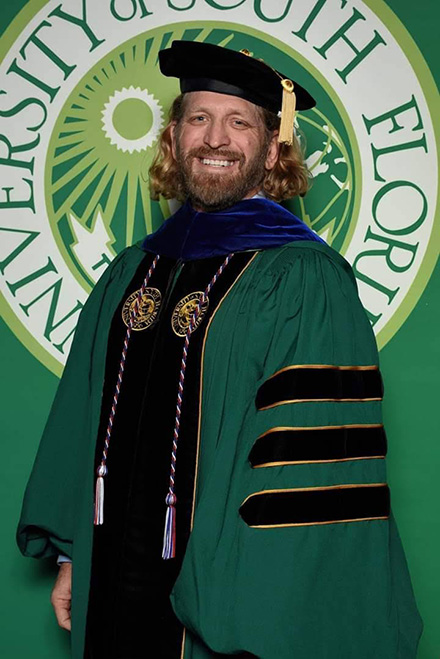
Joseph_Dituri

Dituri is a biomedical researcher in the field of life support equipment design, high carbon dioxide environments, hypobaric medicine, and traumatic brain injury. During his career, he has been a contributing author, co-author, and author in publications, books, and articles including: Secrets in Depth, Hyperbaric Medicine Practice, "Over The Counter" Remedy For DCIs, My Daddy Wears a Different Kind of Suit to Work, and more.

Dituri is a biomedical engineering lecturer at the University of South Florida and instructor of hyperbaric medicine. He serves as a Director of the International Board of Undersea Medicine (IBUM).

== Accomplishments ==
=== Guinness World Record ===
Dituri spent 100 days living underwater at the Jules' Undersea Lodge in Key Largo, Florida. During his stay, Dituri earned a spot in the Guinness World Records for the longest time spent living underwater in a fixed habitat.

=== United States Patent ===
Dituri was granted a United States Patent for a device and system he designed during his Ph.D. dissertation on systems and methods for monitoring heart rate variability. The processing device monitors heart beat data, and executes a heart rate variability program to detect physiological distress, essential in the prevention of hypercapnia, hyperoxia, and decompressive stress

=== U.S. Navy One Atmosphere Suit Pilot ===
Dituri is a certified pilot of the U.S. Navy ADS2000 (Atmospheric Diving System), also known as the One Atmosphere Suit.

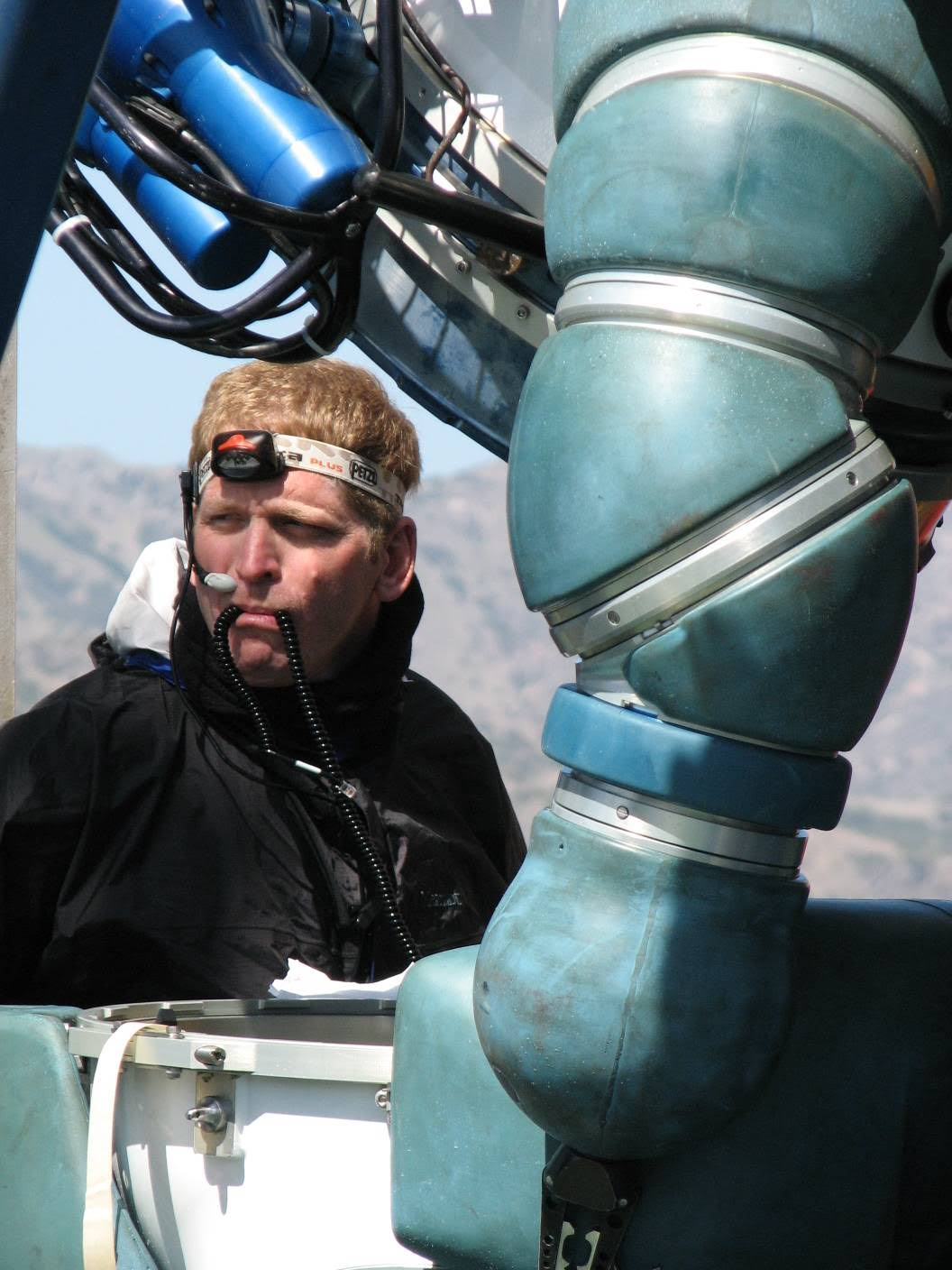
CDR Dituri in a One Atmosphere Suit

=== James Cameron Deepsea Challenger mission ===
Dituri was invited to inspect the Deepsea Challenger that James Cameron piloted to the bottom of the Mariana Trench, at a depth of 10,908 metres (35,787 ft)

== Awards and decorations ==
=== Award ribbons and badges ===
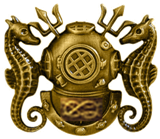

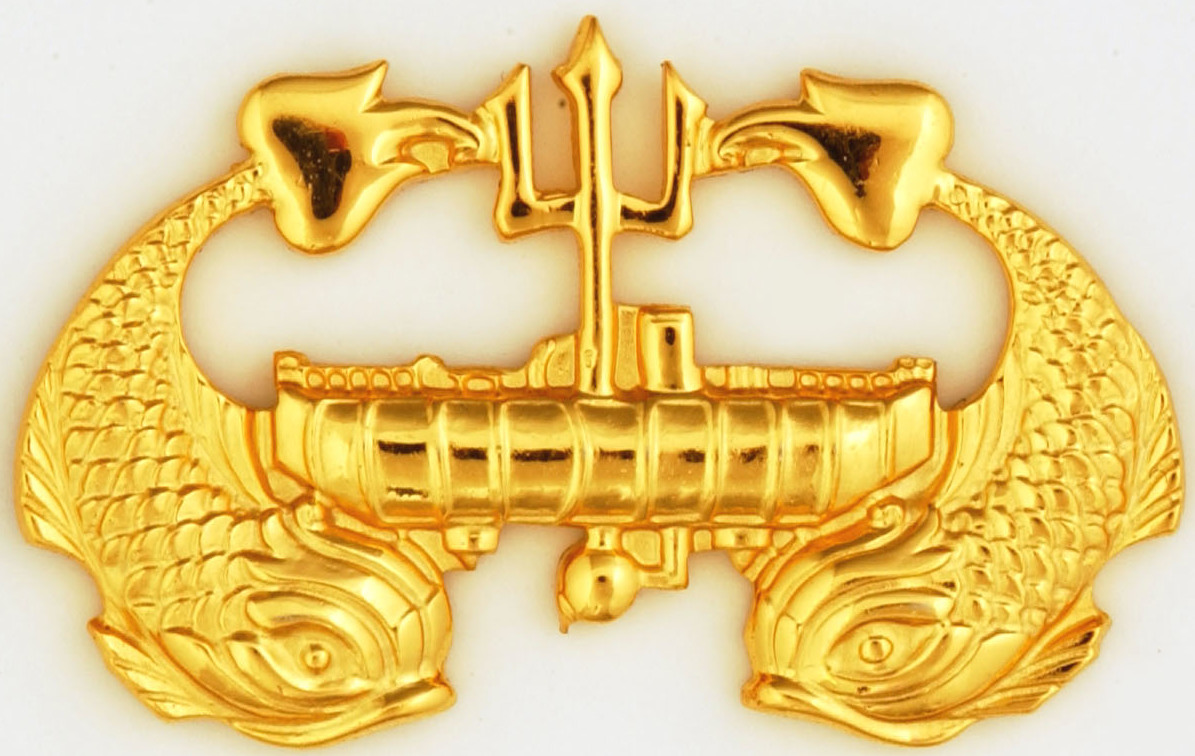
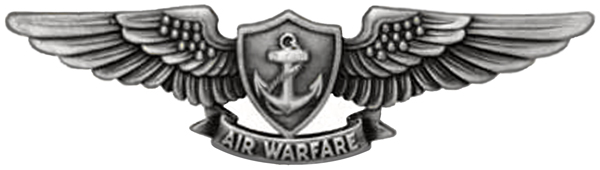
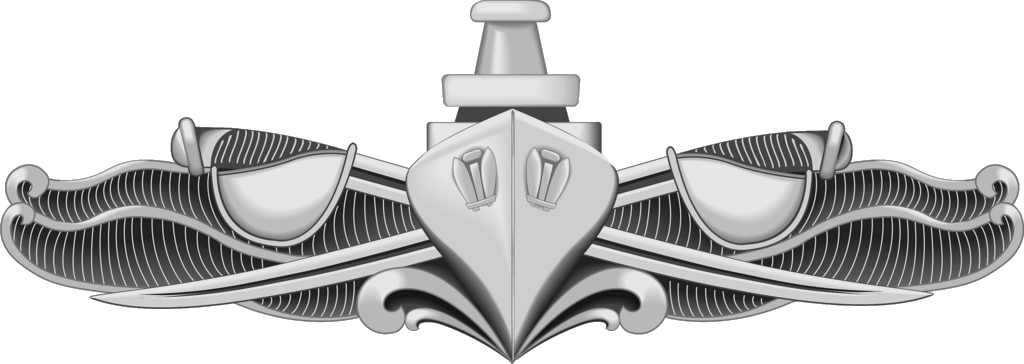
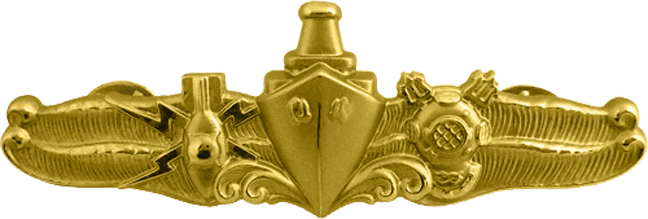

=== Award ribbons and badge names ===
Uniform Service Diver Insignia (United States)

Defense Meritorious Service Medal	Joint Service Commendation Medal	
Navy and Marine Corps Commendation Medal with three gold award stars	Army Commendation Medal	Joint Service Achievement Medal
Navy and Marine Corps Achievement Medal with two gold award stars	Navy Meritorious Unit Commendation with one gold award star	Navy "E" Ribbon with two E's
Navy Good Conduct Medal with one bronze award star	Navy Expeditionary Medal	National Defense Service Medal with one bronze star
Global war on terrorism	Humanitarian Service Medal	Outstanding Volunteer Service Medal
Navy Sea Service Deployment Ribbon with two bronze stars	Navy Expert Rifleman Ribbon with one E	Navy Expert Pistol Shot Ribbon with one E

Deep Submergence Insignia

Enlisted Aviation Warfare Specialist Insignia	Enlisted Surface Warfare Specialist Insignia	Surface Warfare Officer Insignia	Special Operations Officer Insignia

== In media ==
- In 2016, he spoke on human physiology and was the expert diver on the documentary Black Coral
- Dr. Joseph Dituri appeared on Daily Blast Live in 2023, to explain why he lived underwater for 100 days, and also highlighted him breaking the Guinness world record for days spent under water.
- Biohack Yourself, a 2024 documentary, includes Dr. Joseph Dituri where he commented on ways to extend human life, such as telomerase reverse transcriptase (TERT).
- He has also appeared on both seasons of The Unbelievable with Dan Aykroyd where he simplifies the science of the unbelievable.
- Most recently, he presented a new record for underwater time.

== Books ==
- Mount, T. and Joseph Dituri. (2008). Exploration and Mixed Gas Diving Encyclopedia (The Tao of Survival Underwater). The International Association of Nitrox and Technical Divers (IANTD). ISBN 9780915539109
- Dituri, J.A., and Joseph Dituri. (2011). My Daddy Wears a Different Kind of Suit to Work. Gallant Aquatic Ventures International (G.A.V.I.). ISBN 9780578089812
- Whelan, H. T., Kindwall, E. P., & Dituri, J. (2017). Chapters 40, 42, 45, 46. In Hyperbaric Medicine Practice (4th ed). Best Publishing Company. ISBN 9781947239005
- Dituri, J. (2022). Secrets In Depth. Viking Stone Press. ISBN 9798985366426
- Dituri, J. and Sonners, J. (2024). The Art and Science of Hyperbaric Medicine. NOW SC Publishing. ISBN 979-8991597111
- Dituri, J. (2026). Shattered to Strong: A Shift in TBI Recovery Rooted in Science. Viking Stone Press. ISBN 979-8-9853664-4-0

== External links And Helps ==
- https://drdeepsea.com/
- https://www.youtube.com/watch?v=UpnByfqLkmk
