= Pierre-Marie Dioudonnat =

French historian

Pierre-Marie Dioudonnat (French pronunciation: [pjɛʁ maʁi djudɔna]; born 24 March 1945) is a French publisher, historian and political scientist.

Trained in prosopography, he specialises in family history. His name is closely associated with the Encyclopédie de la fausse noblesse et de la noblesse d'apparence, republished in 2002 and 2010 as Le Simili-nobiliaire français, which gathers data on 6,000 surviving French families whose present-day surname links to a false title of nobility.

== Life ==
He was born in Neuilly-sur-Seine. He gained a diploma from the Institut d'études politiques de Paris in 1965 and in 1972 added a doctorate in political science

He stood for the National Front as a successor to Alexandra Bourgoin in the 8th 'circonscription' for Seine-Saint-Denis (93). His wife is Sabine Bragadir, with whom he wrote Dictionnaire des 10 000 dirigeants politiques français.

== Works ==
- Je suis partout, 1930–1944. Les maurrassiens devant la tentation fasciste, La Table ronde, 1973
- Encyclopédie de la fausse noblesse et de la noblesse d’apparence, Sedopols, republished from 1976 to 1997 ISBN 978-2904177156
- Les Ivresses de l’Église de France : les évêques et la société 1801-1976, Le Sagittaire, 1976 ISBN 978-2727500254
- Dictionnaire des 10 000 dirigeants politiques français, avec Sabine Bragadir, Sedopols, 1977
- L’argent nazi à la conquête de la presse française, 1940-1944, Jean Picollec, 1981
- Les 700 rédacteurs de "Je suis partout", Sedopols, 1993 ISBN 2-904177-16-7
- Le Simili-nobiliaire français, Sedopols, 2002 ISBN 2-904177-19-1
  - republished 2010 ISBN 978-2-904177-22-4
- Paroles d’évêques : 19^{e} – 20^{e} siècles : une anthologie du cléricalisme français, recueil de textes, Sedopols, 2005 ISBN 2-904177-20-5
- Demandes de changement de nom 1917–1943 : essai de répertoire analytique : biographie, généalogie, histoire sociale, Sedopols, 2008 ISBN 978-2-904177-21-7
- La France allemande et ses journaux : Scènes et coulisses de la Collaboration 1940-1944, Paris, Les Belles Lettres, 790 p., 2025 ISBN 978-2251457734

== Prizes ==
- Prix Robert-Brasillach 1974.
