= Eddie Paul =

- Born: May 30, 1948; San Francisco, California, U.S.
- Died: July 12, 2016 (aged 68)
- Organization: E.P. Industries

Eddie Paul (May 30, 1948 – July 12, 2016) was an American inventor.

Paul was the owner of design house E.P. Industries, Inc and held multiple U.S. patents. He was born in San Francisco, California, and resided in El Segundo. E.P. Industries included CNC shop Prototech Machine Engineering.

He was known for the creation of customized vehicles for use in Hollywood feature films. His work was seen in such movies as Grease, The Fast and the Furious,Taxi, XXX and Gone in 60 Seconds. He created custom vehicles which toured as Pixar characters Lightning McQueen, Mater and Sally to promote the 2006 animated film Cars.

Paul notably designed the Cylindrical Energy Module (CEM) axial engine for use on fire pumps. The design was later adapted for use on automobiles and was planned to be used on the unrealised Duesenberg Torpedo Coupe project in 2005. The design is used by some fire departments.

Paul also worked on TV shows such as The Dukes of Hazzard and interviewed 8 deaths on the show 1000 Ways To Die. He worked as a stuntman for several years, performing stunts in Ice Pirates and Streets of Fire.

== Inventions ==
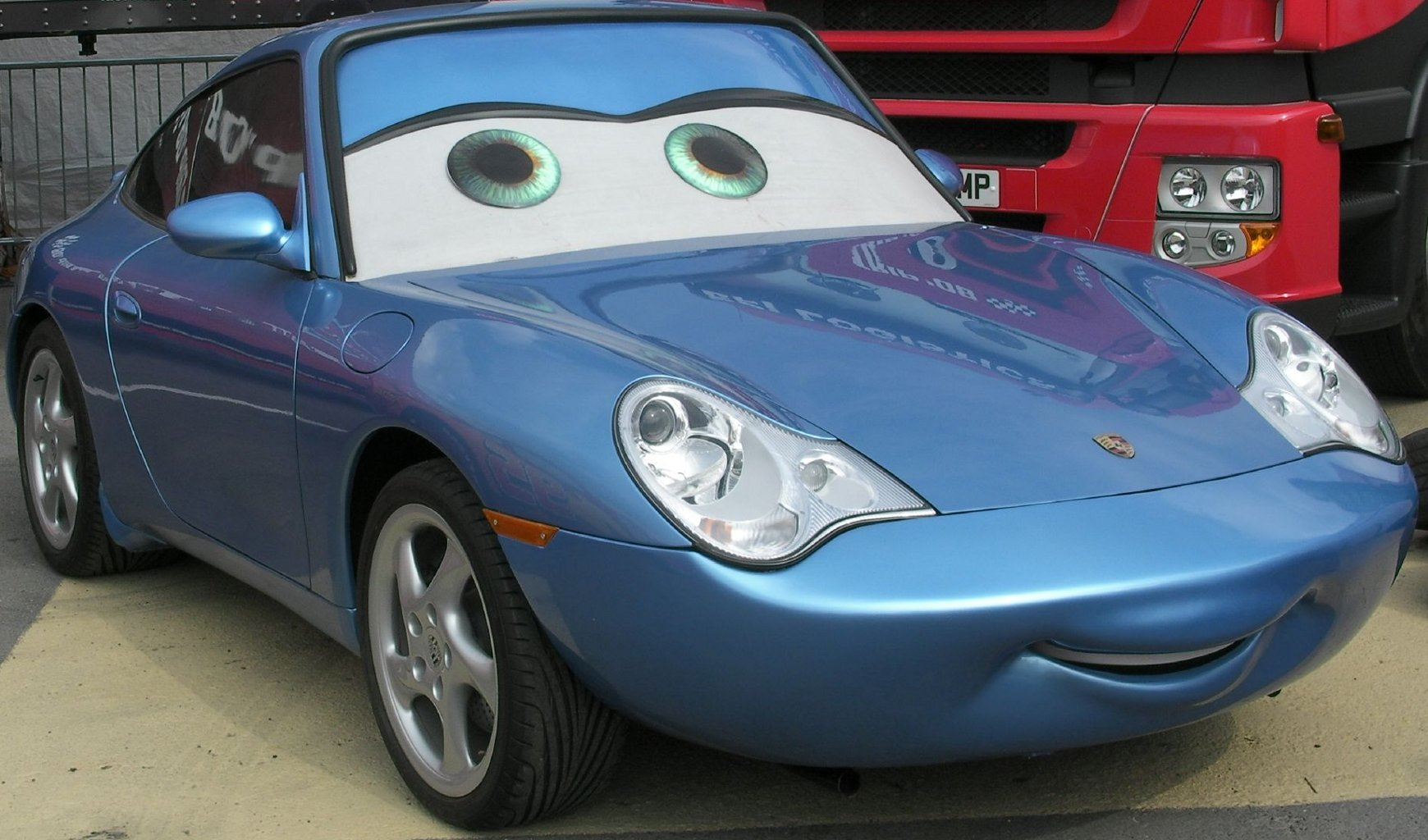
Sally as Eddie Paul custom vehicle for Cars promotional tour

Eddie Paul held US patents for:

- C.E.M. engine (US patent 6145429), a pump that is used by some fire departments.
- Steering control system for trailers (US patent 6273446), a steerable trailer is provided with a trailer hitch which extends forward to attach to a corresponding hitch on the towing vehicle.
- Method and apparatus for producing stereoscopic images with single sensor (US patent 5883695),

Eddie designed and created a mechanical shark for Jean-Michel Cousteau and later created another shark for Fabien Cousteau.
