= 1988 Raleigh tornado outbreak =

Weather event in the United States

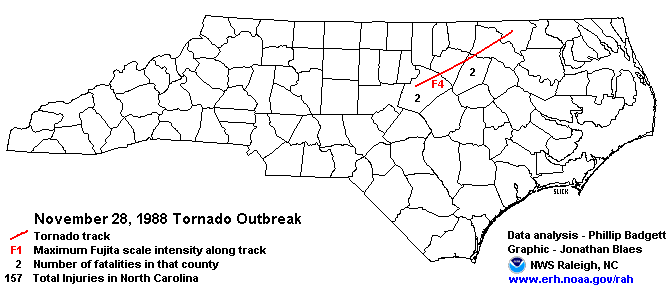
- Path of the Raleigh tornado.

Meteorological history
- Duration: November 28, 1988

Tornado outbreak
- Tornadoes: 7
- Max. rating: F4 tornado
- Duration: ~5 hours

Overall effects
- Fatalities: 4
- Injuries: 154
- Damage: $285 million (non-normalized)
- Areas affected: North Carolina and Virginia

The 1988 Raleigh tornado outbreak was a destructive tornado outbreak in northeastern North Carolina and southeastern Virginia on November 28, 1988, between 1:00 AM and 5:45 AM. A tornado in the Raleigh area produced over $77 million (1988 USD) in damage, along with four fatalities (two in the city of Raleigh, and two in Nash County) and 154 injuries. The damage path from the storm was measured at 84 miles (135 km) long, and 0.5 miles (0.8 km) wide at times.

== Synopsis ==
A surface-level pressure trough was located east of the Appalachian Mountains and extended from Maryland to Georgia. A warm front previously located in the coastal plains had moved into the Piedmont, separating air with temperatures and dew points in the 50s to the northwest from southeastern air with temperatures in the 70s and dew points in the 60s. A large upper level progressive amplitude trough stretched from the Great Lakes to the Mississippi Gulf Coast, and an also large amplitude ridge was situated over the western Atlantic with an axis extending from Bermuda to the Canadian Maritimes. A subtropical jetstream axis extended from the Gulf of Mexico to the Savannah River Basin. A polar jet stream was located over the Ohio River valley. Convective available potential energy was estimated at 1200 J/kg over the Raleigh area.

All that weekend, the Storm Prediction Center was watching the eastern half of the United States for possibility for severe weather, according to WRAL-TV.

== Confirmed tornadoes ==
Confirmed tornadoes by Fujita rating
FU	F0	F1	F2	F3	F4	F5	Total
0	1	3	2	0	1	0	7

F#	Location	County	Time (EST)	Path length	Damage
North Carolina
F4	Raleigh	Wake, Franklin, Nash, Halifax, Northampton	01:08	84 miles	4 deaths – See section on this tornado
F2	near Seaboard	Northampton	03:00	3 miles	Very brief touchdown shortly after previous tornado dissipated – the 2nd in a 3-tornado family that moved into Virginia.
F1	east of Bayboro	Pamlico	03:30	30 miles	Weak tornado that criss-crossed inlets in eastern Pamlico County.
F1	Hyde County	Hyde	04:05	4 miles	Brief touchdown in very sparsely populated area.
F0	Manteo	Dare	05:40	1 mile	Brief touchdown with little damage on Roanoke Island.
Virginia
F1	near Alberta	Brunswick	01:15	3 miles	Brief touchdown.
F2	Franklin	Southampton, City of Franklin, Isle Of Wight	03:20	12 miles	Multi-vortex F2 tornado began just into Virginia, shortly after the Seaboard tornado dissipated. The last tornado from the series that first formed in Raleigh.

=== Raleigh, North Carolina ===
Raleigh, North Carolina
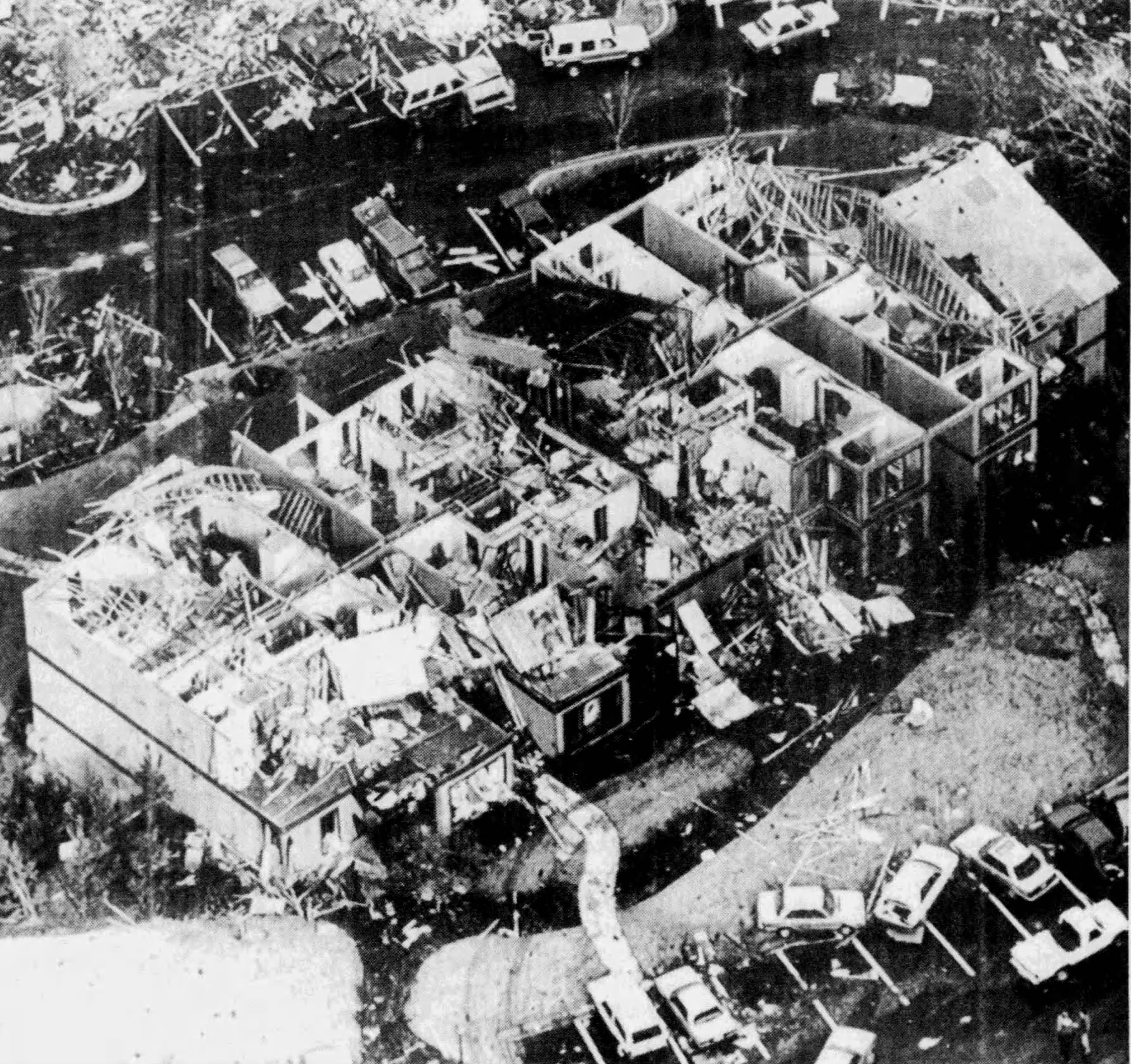
- Damage to an apartment complex in Raleigh

F4 tornado
- on the Fujita scale

Overall effects
- Fatalities: 4
- Injuries: 154

Rated as an F4 on the Fujita scale, this destructive tornado touched down shortly after 1:00 AM on Monday, November 28 in Umstead State Park, between the western city limits of Raleigh and Raleigh-Durham International Airport. It was spawned by a high-precipitation supercell that formed east of Charlotte in the southern Piedmont region and began to exhibit severe and rotational characteristics as it crossed nearby Chatham County; earlier in the afternoon and evening, strong thunderstorms had been noted in the Charlotte area and also in the mountainous northwest corner of North Carolina. However, at 1:00 AM no severe thunderstorm or tornado watch had been issued for Raleigh and Wake County, North Carolina. The weather conditions were believed to not be conducive to the development of such storms. Also, according to a Raleigh News & Observer article on the 25th anniversary of the storm, Joseph M. Pelissier, deputy meteorologist at the National Weather Service office at RDU Airport, stated that the tornado formed almost directly above the airport where there was a blind spot in the radar system.

Warnings were quickly issued as the storm began carving a path through suburban north Raleigh, damaging or destroying nearly 2500 residences and over 75 businesses including entire shopping centers. By 1:30 AM, the tornado had moved out of northern Wake County and into Franklin County, North Carolina. Fluctuating between F1 and F3 in strength, the storm finally dissipated after crossing I-95 between Roanoke Rapids and the Virginia state line. Overall, four people were killed: 2 children in Raleigh, 9-year-old Janet Barnes and 12-year-old Pete Fulghum, and a couple in their mobile home in Nash County. The tornado was responsible for destroying 425 residences and 78 businesses, including a Kmart at 6600 Glenwood Avenue that was completely destroyed and injured three workers. Over 157 people were injured as a result of the storms.

=== Additional tornadoes ===
Shortly after the Raleigh tornado formed, a second supercell produced a weak (F1) tornado near Alberta, Virginia and I-85.

After the Raleigh tornado dissipated, the parent supercell spawned a weaker second tornado (F2) that caused minor damage in a brief touchdown near Seaboard, North Carolina. The storm then spawned a third (also F2) tornado that produced $500,000 in damage in Southampton County, Virginia, Isle Of Wight County, Virginia, and the City of Franklin, Virginia.

Meanwhile, a third supercell later produced weak (F0 and F1) tornadoes in Pamlico County, North Carolina, Hyde County, North Carolina, and the Manteo area on Roanoke Island in Dare County, North Carolina.

== See also ==
- List of North American tornadoes and tornado outbreaks
