= Simone Melchior =

First woman scuba diver and aquanaut (1919–1990)

- Born: 19 January 1919; Toulon, France
- Died: 1 December 1990 (aged 71); Monaco
- Spouse: Jacques-Yves Cousteau (m. 1937)
- Children: Jean-Michel; Philippe Pierre
- Relatives: Fabien Cousteau (grandson); Céline Cousteau (granddaughter); Alexandra Cousteau (granddaughter); Philippe Cousteau Jr. (grandson)

Simone Cousteau (née Melchior; 19 January 1919 – 1 December 1990) was a French explorer. She was the first woman scuba diver and aquanaut, and wife and business partner of undersea explorer Jacques-Yves Cousteau.

Although never visible in the Undersea World of Jacques Cousteau series, Simone played a key role in the operation at sea. Acting as mother, healer, nurse and psychiatrist to the all-male crew for 40 years, her nickname was "La Bergère", the Shepherdess. She led Jacques to the men and money who would build his scuba invention, she helped buy their beloved ship Calypso, saved the ship during a storm, and made sure each exploration achieved its objective.

== Life and career ==
Simone was born on 19 January 1919 in Toulon, France. Her father Henri Melchior and both grandfathers Jules Melchior (paternal) and Jean Baehme (maternal) were admirals in the French Navy. Simone's mother was Marguerite Melchior (née Baehme), affectionately called Guitte. She had two brothers: Maurice, and Simone's twin, Michel.

In 1924, Henri Melchior, as a director with Air Liquide (France's main producer of industrial gases), moved his family to Kobe, Japan. Simone learned Japanese at the age of five years.

Simone met her future husband, Jacques, at a cocktail party in 1937. He was a naval officer of 26 and she was 17. They were married at Saint-Louis-des-Invalides, in Paris, on 12 July 1937.

After a honeymoon in Switzerland and Italy the Cousteaus settled in Le Mourillon, a district of Toulon. They had two sons, Jean-Michel (born 6 May 1938) and Philippe Pierre (30 December 1940 – 28 June 1979). Both sons were born on the family's kitchen table.

In 1942, Simone's father provided financing and the manufacturing expertise of Émile Gagnan at Air Liquide to build Jacques Cousteau's aqua-lung. Simone was indirectly to hold the key to this significant step in diving history. She was present in 1943 at the testing of the prototype for the aqua-lung, in the Marne River outside Paris. The new invention was employed to locate and remove enemy mines after World War II.

The Cousteau family's underwater investigation and exploration led to the purchase of the minesweeper Calypso on 19 July 1950. Thomas Loel Guinness bought the ship and leased it to Jacques for a dollar a year. Simone sold her family jewels for the Calypso's fuel, and her fur to buy a compass and gyroscope. The Calypso set off in 1952 on her maiden voyage, to the Red Sea. Simone was the only woman on board.

In 1963, Simone became the world's first female aquanaut by living in Starfish House, an underwater habitat, for the final four days of the Conshelf II project.

Describing his wife, Jacques Cousteau said, "She was the happiest out of camera range, in the crow's nest of Calypso, for example, scanning the sea for whales. Nothing would get by her." He continued, "She lives to spend hour after hour in the wind and the sun, watching, thinking, trying to unravel the mystery of the sea." Simone died in 1990 of cancer. She received a full military funeral, during which her ashes were scattered over the Mediterranean Sea in Monaco.

== Grant ==
On 8 March 2021, the Women Divers Hall of Fame announced on International Women's Day, that a new research grant in the name of the French diver, Simone Melchior-Cousteau was being launched.
