= Fabien Cousteau =

Aquanaut, ocean conservationist, and documentary filmmaker

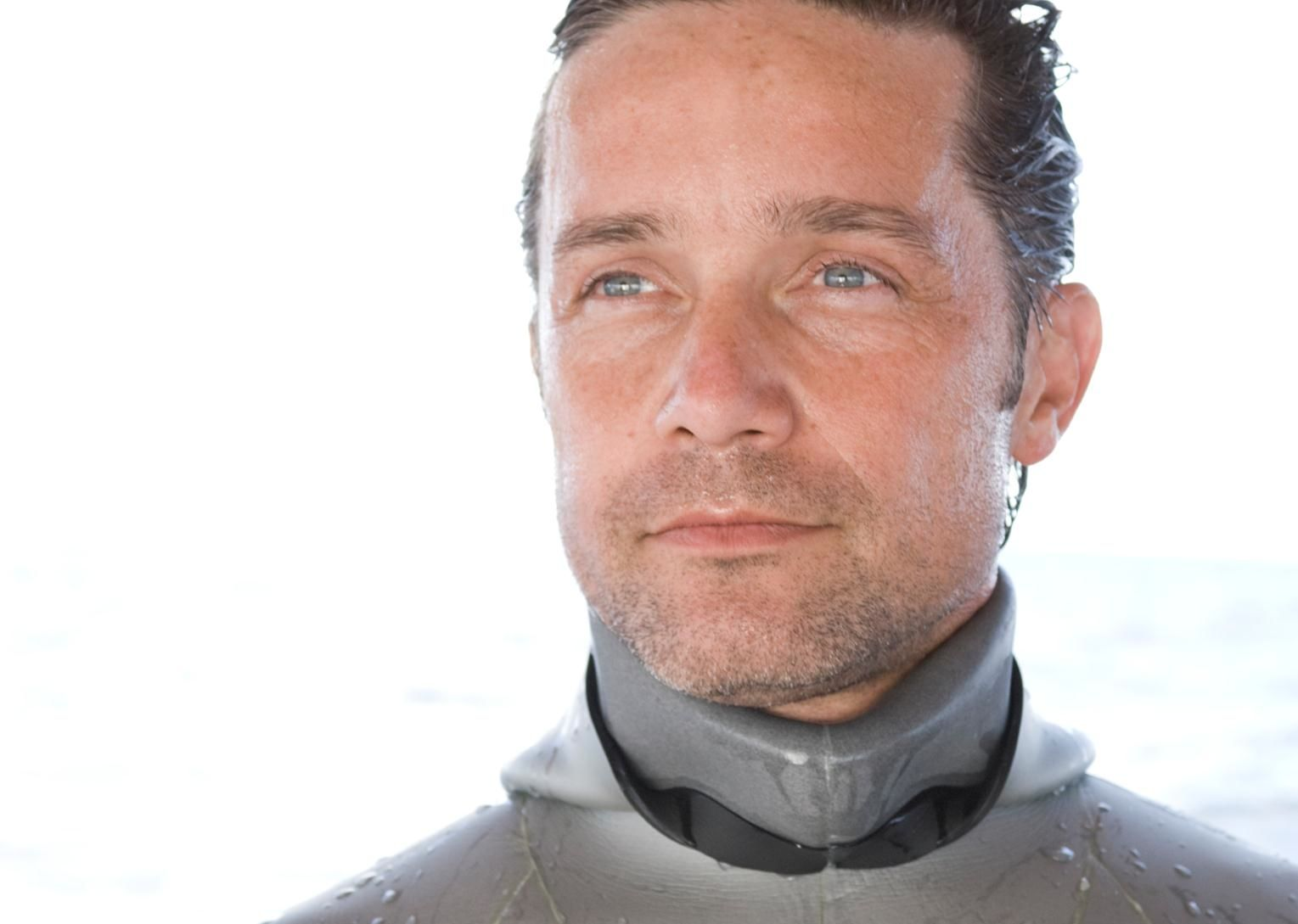
- Born: 2 October 1967 (age 59); Paris, France
- Education: Boston University
- Occupations: Filmmaker and explorer
- Spouse: Lisa Singer
- Parent(s): Jean-Michel Cousteau; Anne-Marie Cousteau
- Relatives: Céline Cousteau (sister); Jacques Cousteau (grandfather); Simone Cousteau (grandmother); Philippe Cousteau (uncle); Jan Cousteau (aunt); Alexandra Cousteau (cousin); Philippe Cousteau Jr. (cousin); Pierre-Antoine Cousteau (great-uncle)

Fabien Cousteau (born 2 October 1967) is an aquanaut, ocean conservationist, and documentary filmmaker. As the first grandson of Jacques Cousteau, Fabien spent his early years aboard his grandfather's ships Calypso and Alcyone, and learned how to scuba dive on his fourth birthday. From 2000 to 2002, he was explorer-at-large for National Geographic and collaborated on a television special aimed at changing public attitudes about sharks called "Attack of the Mystery Shark". From 2003 to 2006, he produced the documentary Shark: Mind of a Demon that aired on CBS. With the help of a large crew, he created a 14-foot, 1,200-pound, lifelike shark submarine called Troy that enabled him to immerse himself inside the shark world.

For the next four years (2006–2010), Cousteau was part of a multi-hour series for PBS called Ocean Adventures with his father, Jean-Michel Cousteau, and sister, Céline, which was inspired by his grandfather's 1978 PBS series, Ocean Adventures.

In early 2009, Cousteau began working with local communities and children worldwide to help restore local water ecosystems. He continues to pursue these initiatives through the Fabien Cousteau Ocean Learning Center his non-profit 501(c)(3) founded in early 2016 dedicated to the restoration of the world's water bodies through active community engagement and education.

== Early life and education ==
Fabien Cousteau is the grandson of oceanographic explorer Jacques Cousteau, and son of Jean-Michel Cousteau who assisted Jacques on most of his expeditions. Fabien was born and raised in France, although he has lived in the United States for most of his life. He has a sister, Céline Cousteau.

Fabien's first scuba dive was at age four when Jacques strapped a custom-made scuba tank to his back and sent the boy off into the Mediterranean Sea. His interest in sharks began at a young age, about 6 or 7, and was piqued when he sneaked into a showing of the film Jaws. The film perplexed him – "It went against everything I had ever learned about sharks ... Great white sharks don't go around chopping up boats," he explained – and started him on a mission to clear up "the gross misconceptions we have about sharks".

At age seven, Cousteau accompanied his grandfather and father on the first of many sea trips aboard the Calypso and Alcyone, the ships that transported the explorers to their dive locations. He officially joined the crew at age twelve; his first job was to remove barnacles from Jacques's boats.

Fabien attended Norfolk Academy in Virginia and graduated from Boston University with a bachelor's degree in environmental economics.

== Career ==
After school, Cousteau worked as a marketer for an American company, Seventh Generation. "I decided to start up in a different career, in which my name would not help me, just to see if I could survive", he explained. After three years, he returned to the family business, working for his father at Deep Ocean Odyssey, an exploration company founded by his grandfather. Fabien Cousteau found Technology living underwater." He then spent time as a diving and underwater product tester while looking for a company to appoint him "explorer-in-residence".

In 2002, Cousteau went out on his own, launching his first expedition without family help: a dive where he filmed his interactions with bull sharks in the Bahamas. He spent three months filming sharks for what would become his first National Geographic Explorer special, "Attacks of the Mystery Shark". In filming, he was "shocked at how few encounters we had. We would go past a school of 50 or 60 sharks during feeding and not one paid any attention to us." The episode, which debuted on 4 August 2002, investigated a recent rise of bull shark attacks and an incident in 1916 he found a shark never seen before, two of them upstream in Matawan Creek. The Globe and Mail described the special: If you "get through the corny setup ... this special offers some good television." A second shark documentary followed shortly thereafter. Also in 2002, Cousteau began work on a children's book called The Prince of Atlantis and founded an online conservation organization named Planet Riders.

== Troy ==
In 2004, he was asked to make a new shark documentary. Having already made two, he was hesitant until he remembered a Tintin cartoon story he had read as a boy. In Red Rackham's Treasure, Tintin explores the ocean while on a treasure hunt using a shark-shaped submarine. "When I thought back on that, I thought it was a really good idea", Cousteau recalled. "I wanted to film these sharks without any of the artificial stimuli". Normally, sharks' behavior is affected by the attempts to observe them, with chumming and shark cages leading to footage of aggressive, open mouthed sharks that does not represent their natural behavior.

In order to make his vision a reality, he contracted with Hollywood engineer and family friend Eddie Paul. After a year of development, "Troy", a 14-foot (4.3 m) long, 1,200-pound (540 kg) submarine shaped like a great white shark, was ready for testing. Cousteau's initial attempts to drive Troy were "a disaster" as he was unable to get it to move straight. Once he mastered the steering, Troy was capable of fish-like motion. A wet sub, it was filled with water while operating. To breathe, he carried full diving equipment weighing about 80 pounds (36 kg), which provided about 6.5 hours of air. He lay on his stomach, propped up on his elbows to operate Troy. The submarine was designed to survive a shark attack.

Sharks appeared to view Troy as another shark. They stayed about 23 to 29 feet (7.0 to 8.8 m) away from it, the length of an adult shark, and rolled their eyes, puffed their gills, and changed directions in response to it. These behaviors were observed only in the presence of the submarine, not with free divers, although Cousteau said he was hesitant to say it proved the sharks saw Troy as a shark. he called the experience of being surrounded by up to five great white sharks at once a "humbling experience. They're like 747s underwater ... but they are so graceful and so deceivingly calm, and very sure of themselves."

For several weeks in 2005, he navigated among the sharks near Guadalupe Island, Mexico. The resulting documentary, entitled Shark: Mind of a Demon, aired on CBS in 2006. In total, he filmed 170 hours of footage which were made available for scientific study. According to Cousteau, his crew was able to get good data on great white territorial boundaries. One night, while operating Troy, he lost contact with his support vehicles. "I ended up anchoring Troy and swimming 230 feet (70 m) in absolute darkness to Isla de Guadalupe", he recalled. "That was the fastest I've ever swam." On another occasion, Troy broke and got pinned at the bottom of the sea. After some tense moments, his dive team was eventually able to free Cousteau and bring him to the surface. After the project was complete, he declared "I'm done with sharks for now. There are so many [other] things I want to explore".

== After sharks ==
From August 2005 to March 2006, Cousteau and his sister led a series of dives at the United States' 13 marine sanctuaries. The footage was turned into a two-part episode of Jean-Michel Cousteau: Ocean Adventures called "America's Underwater Treasures." Among other things, the team captured footage of goliath groupers, humpback whales, a rare giant Pacific octopus, and spawning coral. They also visited various shipwrecks including a sunken Civil War battleship, and talked to ecologists. Cousteau said the goal of the show was to "make these special places real for viewers everywhere". The Cousteau family's PBS series "Jean-Michel Cousteau Ocean Adventures" continued on through 2009, with its expeditions spanning from the Arctic to Papua New Guinea and the Amazon and covering topics from climate change to indigenous cultures.

=== Mission 31 ===
Originally scheduled for November 2013, Mission 31 was postponed to June 2014 due to a US federal government shutdown. From 1 June to 2 July, Cousteau spent 31 days underwater filming and collecting scientific data as a tribute to his grandfather. In doing so, he set the record for longest time underwater for a film crew, surpassing his grandfather's 30 days set in 1963. However, people on submarines have spent a longer periods living underwater, so it was not an absolute record. He got the idea for Mission 31 when visiting the undersea laboratory Aquarius during a fundraiser aiming to keep it operating in the wake of federal budget cuts. It was his first saturation dive.

By working out of Aquarius instead of diving from the surface, Mission 31 crew members were able to scuba dive up to nine hours without surfacing or undergoing decompression. After the expedition concluded, Cousteau remarked "I didn't know how I was going to react – physically, psychologically – [but] it was amazing how much it felt like home." He estimated his team had collected the equivalent of two-years' worth of data during the mission, enough for ten scientific papers, and said he "would have loved to have continued beyond 31 days".

== Proteus ==
Proteus is the project Fabien Cousteau is planning for a construction of a community of ocean flooring analysis stations, situated off Curaçao at a depth of about 20 m in a marine-protected area. Aquanauts could reside and work in these underwater habitats. Front-end engineering starts in 2022, with the habitat put on the sea bottom in 2025.
