= Jean-Michel Cousteau =

French oceanographic explorer

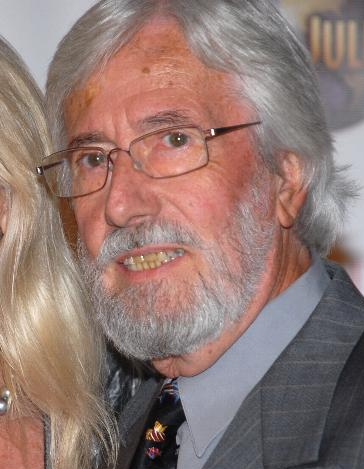
- Cousteau in December 2007
- Born: 6 May 1938 (age 88); Toulon, Third French Republic
- Occupations: Oceanographic explorer Film producer
- Spouse: Anne Marie (div.)
- Partner: Nancy Marr
- Children: Fabien Cousteau; Céline Cousteau
- Parent(s): Jacques-Yves Cousteau; Simone Melchior
- Relatives: Philippe Cousteau (brother); Pierre-Antoine Cousteau (uncle); Alexandra Cousteau (niece); Philippe Cousteau Jr. (nephew)

Jean-Michel Cousteau (born 6 May 1938) is a French oceanographic explorer, environmentalist, educator and film producer. The first son of ocean explorer Jacques Cousteau, he is the father of Fabien Cousteau and Céline Cousteau.

== Life and career ==
Cousteau is the son of Jacques-Yves Cousteau and Simone Cousteau, who were business partners. Cousteau first dived with an aqua-lung in 1945 when he was seven years old. Although he went to school to study architecture, he joined his father's Cousteau Society, serving for twenty years as executive vice president before striking out on his own in 1993 to produce environmental films. Cousteau and his father disagreed on the management and policies of the Society.

After Cousteau opened a resort on a Fiji island utilizing the family name, Jacques-Yves Cousteau filed a lawsuit against him in 1996. In June 1996, a court signed an injunction requiring him to add, with equal prominence in placement, his first name to the hotel. Jean-Michel then founded the Ocean Futures Society in 1999, a marine conservation and education organization. In 2003, Francesca Sorrenti and Marisha Shibuya of the SKe GROUP project, in partnership with Ocean Futures Society, collaborated to produce Water Culture, a Trolley Books publication featuring a wide variety of photographer's water-related imagery and interviews with prominent world personalities on the problems facing our water supply. Cousteau is also Chairman of Green Cross France. Cousteau advocates for a world free of nuclear weapons, and is a member of the Advisory Council of the Nuclear Age Peace Foundation.

Cousteau is working on a documentary highlighting the epic and disastrous 2010 Gulf Oil Spill in which 11 workers were killed during an explosion of deepwater rig 50 miles (80 km) off the coast of Louisiana, United States.

In 2012, he published the book My Father, The Captain: My Life with Jacques Cousteau.

Cousteau is the President of Green Cross France & Territoires, a NGO proposing keys for actions towards a better environment for an unburdened future.

=== Film production and appearances ===
He has produced over 70 films. He appears in the 2003 IMAX documentary film Coral Reef Adventure.

He appeared on a documentary-type special feature, Case of the Sponge "Bob", on the DVD version of The SpongeBob SquarePants Movie (2004) in which he and Stephen Hillenburg talk about all of the real-life counterparts to the sea creatures seen in the cartoon series and movie. He did a similar feature for the DVD of the Disney/Pixar movie Finding Nemo: Exploring the Reef with Jean-Michel Cousteau. In Disney's DVD release of Finding Nemo, Cousteau makes an appearance interacting with the characters from the film, Marlin, Nemo and Dory, and touting the need for better pollution control, showing videos of polluted coral reefs.

Cousteau made a new documentary series Ocean Adventures released in 2006. Ocean Futures Society, KQED and PBS are continuing production on the Ocean Adventures series for 2007 and 2008. In October 2006, Cousteau, and an expedition team that includes his son Fabien and daughter Céline, began filming along the Amazon River. Twenty years ago scientists predicted devastation and irreversible environmental damage here, and 25 years ago Cousteau and his father traveled with their teams the entire length of the Amazon to document, learn, and see for themselves.

In 2006, Cousteau's documentary Voyage to Kure inspired then U.S. President George W. Bush to protect the Papahānaumokuākea Marine National Monument, making it—with its 140,000 square miles (360,000 km^{2}) of ocean waters, islands, and atolls—one of the largest Marine Protected Areas in the world.

== Filmography ==
Unless noted otherwise, all are appearances as himself.

- The Undersea World of Jacques Cousteau (1968) (Associate Producer)
  - "Search in the Deep"
  - "Savage Worlds of the Coral Jungle"
- The Alan Thicke Show (17 October 1980)
- Les Pièges de la mer aka Cries from the Deep (1982) (Delegate Producer)
- Cousteau: Alaska: Outrage at Valdez (1989) (also Executive Producer & Director)
- The Sacred Mirror of Kofun (1996) (video game/digital multimedia encyclopedia)
- Stories of the Sea (1996)
- Exploring the Reef with Jean-Michel Cousteau (2003) (short film featuring the Finding Nemo characters Marlin, Nemo and Dory)
- MacGillivray Freeman's Coral Reef Adventure (2003)
- Hollywood's Magical Island: Catalina (2003) (also thanked by the Ocean Futures Society)
- Deadly Sounds in the Silent World (2003)
- Sharks 3D (2004) (Presenter)
- Tout le monde en parle (10 April 2004)
- Case of the Sponge "Bob" (2004) (short film featuring Stephen Hillenburg on The SpongeBob SquarePants Movie DVD.)
- The 100 Greatest Family Films (2005) (films about ocean)
- Jean-Michel Cousteau: Ocean Adventures (2006—) (also Executive Producer)
  - "America's Underwater Treasures" (two parts, 20 & 27 September 2006) Robert Redford
  - "Sharks at Risk" (12 July 2006) (narrated by Pierce Brosnan)
  - "The Gray Whale Obstacle Course" (19 July 2006) (narrated by Pierce Brosnan)
  - "Voyage to Kure" (two parts, 5 & 12 April 2006) (narrated by Pierce Brosnan) (ASIN B000CSUNL6)
  - "Return to the Amazon" (two parts, 2 & 9 April 2008) (narrated by Delroy Lindo)
  - "Sea Ghosts" (8 April 2009) (narrated by Anne Heche)
  - "Call of the Killer Whale" (22 April 2009) (narrated by Chris Noth; two parts, focusing on New Zealand, reintroducing Keiko of Free Willy fame to the wild, and Norway)
- Slater Meets Her Hero Jean-Micheal Cousteau (2006)
- Voxtours: "Karibische Jungferninseln – Die British Virgin Islands" (19 August 2006)
- Dolphins and Whales 3D: Tribes of the Ocean (2008) (Presenter)
- The Late Late Show with Craig Ferguson (1 April 2008, 31 July 2008, 25 June 2010, 11 February 2011 and 4 August 2011, 11 September 2013)
- Wonders of the Sea 3D (21 December 2017)
