= Céline Cousteau =

Environmental advocate and documentary film maker

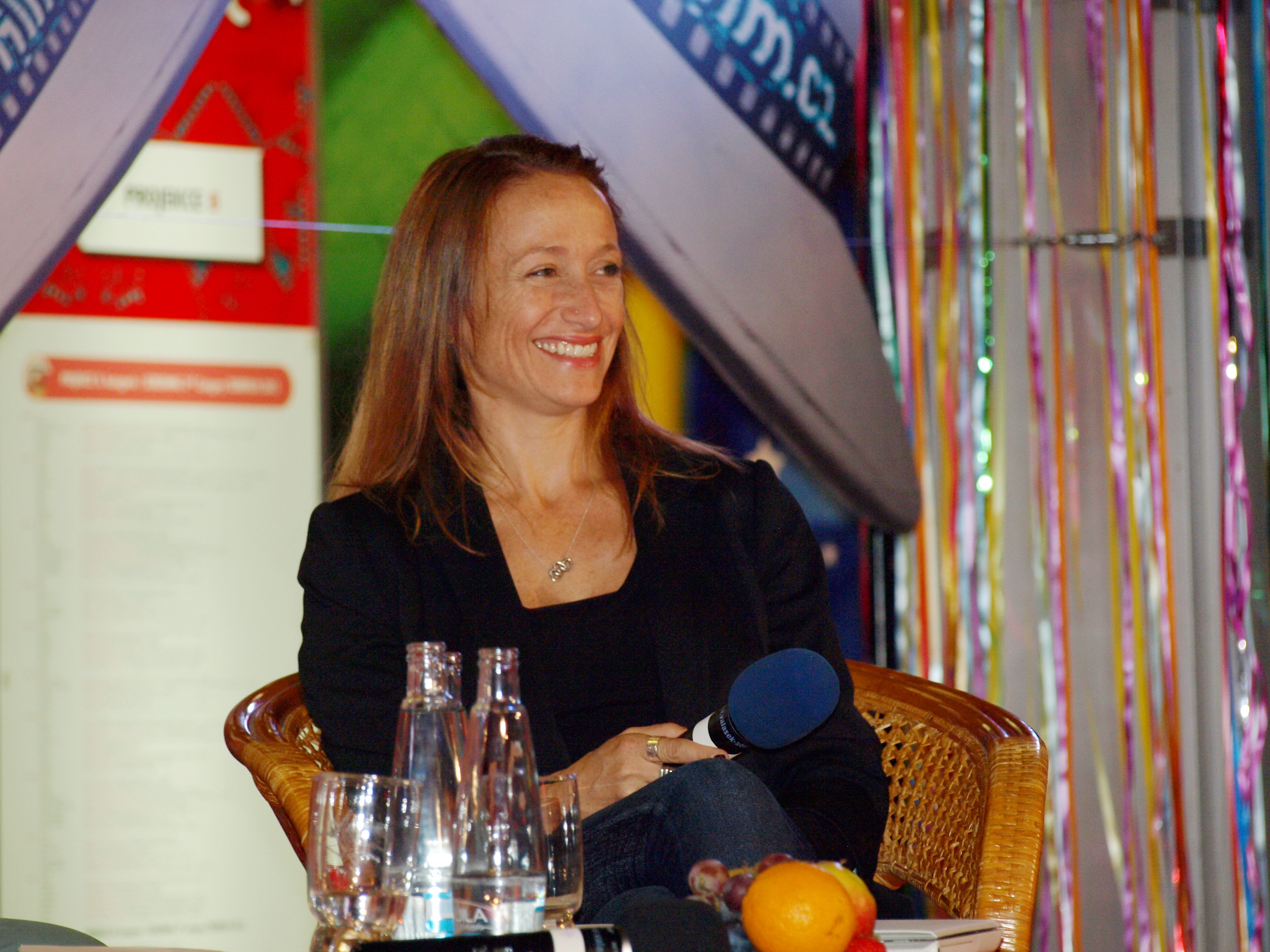
- Cousteau in 2013
- Born: Céline S. Cousteau; June 6, 1972 (age 54); Los Angeles County, California, USA
- Organization(s): CauseCentric Productions, The Outdoor Film Fellowship, The Javari Project
- Known for: Film production and direction, exploration, conservation, design, ambassadorship
- Children: 1
- Father: Jean-Michel Cousteau
- Relatives: Fabien Cousteau (brother); Jacques Cousteau (grandfather); Simone Cousteau (grandmother); Philippe Cousteau (uncle); Jan Cousteau (aunt); Alexandra Cousteau (cousin); Philippe Cousteau Jr. (cousin); Pierre-Antoine Cousteau (great-uncle)

Céline S. Cousteau (born June 6, 1972) is a socio-environmental advocate and public figure. She is known for her work as a documentary film director, producer, explorer, artist, public speaker, brand ambassador, designer, author, and wellness workshop facilitator. She has been a panelist at the United Nations in New York, speaks on stage to audiences around the world, and has interviewed many prominent figures including President Lasso of Ecuador. She is the Founder/Director of CauseCentric Productions and previously Co-founder/ Chairman of the Board of the Outdoor Film Fellowship. She is the daughter of ocean explorer and filmmaker Jean-Michel Cousteau, and granddaughter of Jacques Cousteau.

== Early years and personal life ==
Cousteau is the third generation of the Cousteau family of explorers. She was born in California to Jean-Michel Cousteau, a documentary-filmmaker and environmental advocate, and Anne-Marie Cousteau, an expedition photographer. She is the sister of Fabien Cousteau, an ocean explorer and shark advocate, and granddaughter of pioneering ocean explorer Jacques Cousteau. She grew up in their family homes in France and the United States.

Cousteau spent some of her youth aboard her grandfather's research vessel the Calypso with her family. One of her major expeditions on board was at age nine when she journeyed to the Amazon. The expedition lasted 18 months of which she spent 2 weeks navigating its coastal and jungle waters in areas that were still largely unknown to the outside world. It was through this experience that Cousteau began to learn about the interconnectedness of not only the environment, but humanity. She has spent her life dedicated to understanding the human "tribe" and the relationships forged between individuals, communities and ecosystems; this has been the inspiration behind her films, artworks and activism.

She has one son with her partner Çapkin van Alphen, an Australian cameraman.

== Education ==
Cousteau attended the Norfolk Academy in Virginia and the United Nations International School in New York City, and graduated from Skidmore College in 1994, where she majored in psychology and minored in studio art. She received her master's degree in International and Intercultural Management from the School for International Training. She received an honorary doctoral degree from the University of Aveiro.

== Career ==
Cousteau is the founder and CEO of CauseCentric Productions. CauseCentric Productions produces and distributes multi-media content with an emphasis on short films to amplify the voices and communicate the stories of solution focused grassroots organizations and individuals working on environmental and socio-cultural issues. She also the co-founded of the Outdoor Film Fellowship, formerly the Céline Cousteau Film Fellowship, a film fellowship program that existed for three years equipping young filmmakers, creatives, and activists to motivate change through storytelling.

Cousteau released her first feature documentary, Tribes on Edge, in 2019. She first went to the Vale do Javari Indigenous territory in the Brazilian Amazon in 2007 as part of a documentary for PBS, Return to the Amazon. In 2010, the indigenous peoples of that land asked her asked her to come back and tell their story to the world. There she spent time with tribes of the Vale do Javari, Brazilian Amazon, whose existence has increasingly become threatened by the modern world.

== Art and fashion ==
- Spring/Summer 2016 – Ocean Mysteries Collection, guest Designer for Swarovski
- Fall/Winter 2016 – Tribute to Tribe Collection, guest Designer for Swarovski
- Fall 2017 – Regenerating the Reef Couture Collection, Associate Designer for Deborah Milner

== Ambassadorships and associations ==
- International Spokeswoman, La Prairie skincare company (2007–2014)
- Sustainability Partner, Contiki Holidays (2010–2014)
- Advisory Council Member, Adventurers and Scientists for Conservation (2012)
- Council Member on Global Agenda Council of Oceans, World Economic Forum, (2012–2016)
- Ambassador, the TreadRight Foundation (2014–present)
- Ambassador, Jane Goodall's Roots & Shoots program (2015)
- Advisory Board Members, Marine Construction Technologies (2015–2019)
- Brand Ambassador, Keen Footwear (2016)
- Advisory Board Member, the Himalayan Consensus (2017–2019)
- Board of Directors, National Aquarium in Baltimore (2018–present)

== Filmography ==
Year	Production	Role	Notes
2006/2007	Ocean Adventures Series: America's Underwater Treasures	Series Host, Field Producer	TV mini-series, PBS
2006	Ocean Adventures Series: Grey Whale Obstacle Course	Series Host, Field Producer	TV mini-series, PBS
2008	Ocean Adventures Series: Return to the Amazon	Series Host, Field Producer	TV mini-series, PBS
2008	Amazon Promise	Director, producer	CauseCentric Short Film
2008	Mysteries of the Shark Coast	Co-host	TV movie, Discovery Channel
2009	Ocean Adventures Series: Call of the Killer Whale	Series Host, Field Producer	TV mini-series, PBS
2009	URCSF: Grow Gardens in Uganda,	Director, producer	Short Film, CauseCentric
2009	Green Chimneys: Foster Healing with Animal Assisted Therapy	Director, producer	Short Film, CauseCentric
2009	Oceano: Chile Frente al Mar, episode "Antartica"	Co-host	TV series, Consejo Nacional de Television
2009	Oceano: Chile Frente al Mar, episode "Canales y Fiordos"	Co-host	TV series, Consejo Nacional de Television
2009	Oceano: Chile Frente al Mar, episode "Desierto y Cobre"	Co-host	TV series, Consejo Nacional de Television
2009	Oceano: Chile Frente al Mar, episode "Isla de Pascua"	Co-host	TV series, Consejo Nacional de Television
2009	Oceano: Chile Frente al Mar, episode "Juan Fernandez"	Co-host	TV series, Consejo Nacional de Television
2009	Oceano: Chile Frente al Mar, episode "Pam Denisse"	Co-host	TV series, Consejo Nacional de Television
2009	Oceano: Chile Frente al Mar, episode "Patagonio"	Co-host	TV series, Consejo Nacional de Television
2009	Oceano: Chile Frente al Mar, episode "Pisagua"	Co-host	TV series, Consejo Nacional de Television
2009	Oceano: Chile Frente al Mar, episode "Punta de Choros"	Co-host	TV series, Consejo Nacional de Television
2009	Oceano: Chile Frente al Mar, episode "Valparaiso"	Co-host	TV series, Consejo Nacional de Television
2009	Oceano: Chile Frente al Mar, episode "El Fin de la Aventura"	Co-host	TV series, Consejo Nacional de Television
2009	Oceano: Chile Frente al Mar, Episode	Co-host	TV series, Consejo Nacional de Television
2010	Healing Seekers: Search Traditional Medicine	Director, producer	Short Film, CauseCentric
2011	Sirenia: the Mystique of the Manatees	Director, producer	Short Film, CauseCentric
2011	Scars of Freedom	Director, producer	Short Film, CauseCentric
2013	Exploring Eden in Patagonia: from Glacier to Bay	Director, producer	Short Film, CauseCentric
2013	Exploring Eden in Patagonia: Diving In	Director, producer	Short Film, CauseCentric
2018	L'aventure continue avec Céline Cousteau en Patagonie, episode 1	Co-host, Co-author	TV series, France 3
2018	L'aventure continue avec Céline Cousteau en Patagonie, episode 2	Co-host, Co-author	TV series, France 3
2019	Tribes on the Edge	Director, producer, Co-writer, Host	Feature-length documentary and impact campaign, CauseCentric
2019	Legends of the Deep: Bermuda Triangle, The Secret Shipwreck	Co-host	TV mini-series, Science Channel
2019	Legends of the Deep: Search For The Sunken UFO	Co-host	TV mini-series, Science Channel
2019	Legends of the Deep: Curse Of The Sea Monster	Co-host	TV mini-series, Science Channel
2019	Legends of the Deep: Mystery of the Spy Sabotage	Co-host	TV mini-series, Science Channel
2020	Céline Cousteau à Madagascar, Des arbres et des hommes	Co-host, co-author	TV series, France 3
2020	Céline Cousteau à Madagascar, La forêt de merveilles	Co-host, co-author	TV series, France 3
