= Jan Cousteau =

Wife of undersea explorer Philippe Cousteau

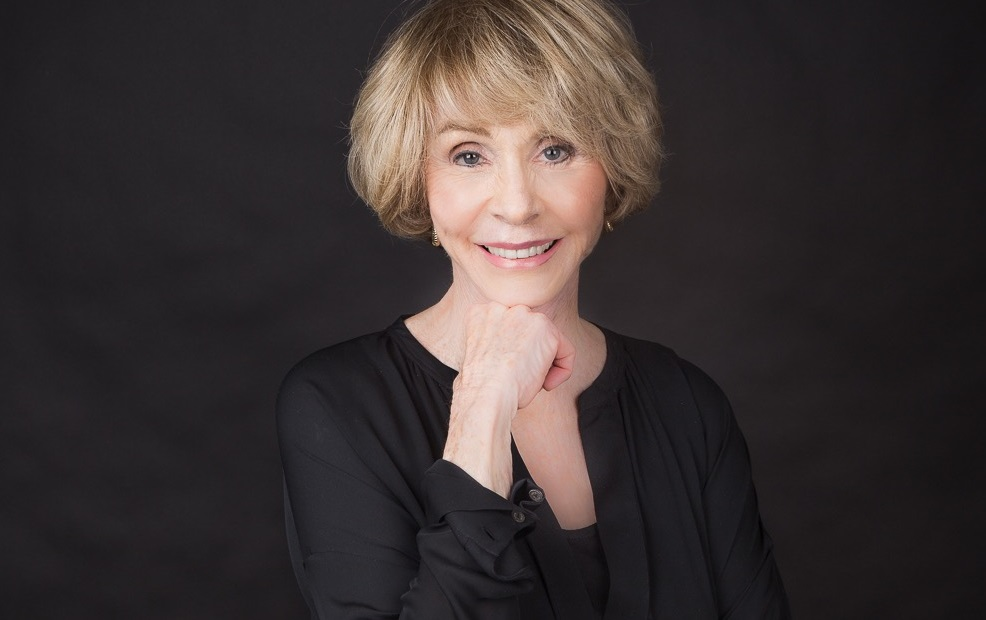
- Born: Janice Sullivan; 5 April 1939 (age 85); Redondo Beach, California, U.S.
- Spouse: Philippe Cousteau (m. 1967; died 1979)
- Children: Alexandra Cousteau; Philippe Cousteau, Jr.

Janice Cousteau (née Sullivan; 5 April 1939) is the widow of undersea explorer Philippe Cousteau and joined the Cousteau team on 20 expeditions over 12 years.

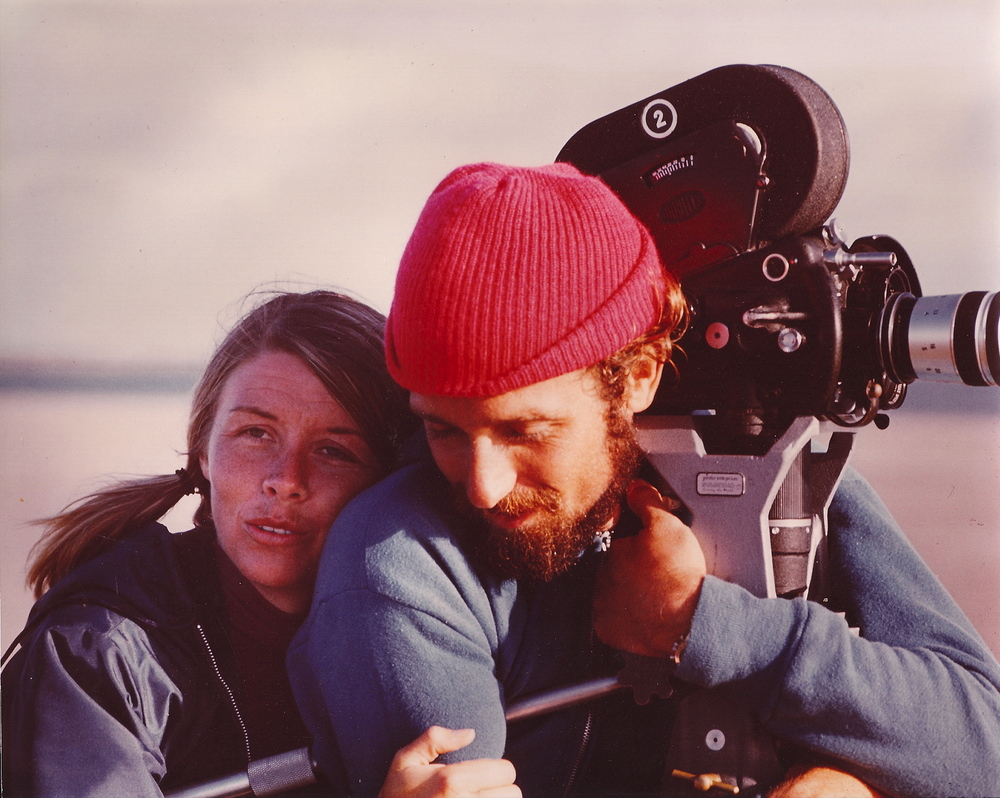
Jan and Philippe Cousteau during an expedition

She and Philippe married in Paris. They had two children, Alexandra Cousteau and Philippe Cousteau Jr., born six months after his father's accidental death.

As of 2007, she served on the board of directors of the Washington Humane Society and is a co-founder, with her children, of EarthEcho International. She has also served on the board of directors for Alliance française.

She still takes part in occasional expeditions.
