= EarthEcho International =

US-based nonprofit organization

EarthEcho International is an environmental nonprofit organization founded in honor of oceanographer Philippe Cousteau, by his children and widow. EarthEcho is based in Washington, D.C. The foundation was originally named the Philippe Cousteau Foundation, but changed its name after a dispute with the Cousteau Society.

One of EarthEcho's outreach activities is the "EarthEcho Water Challenge", formerly called "World Water Monitoring Day", an annual event promoting citizen monitoring of their local water resources.
