= Pierre-Antoine Cousteau =

French writer (1906–1958)

Pierre-Antoine Cousteau (French pronunciation: [pjɛʁ ɑ̃twan kusto]; 18 March 1906 – 17 December 1958) was a French journalist, polemicist, and Axis collaborationist. He was the elder brother of the explorer Jacques-Yves Cousteau.

An avid political journalist, Cousteau initially wrote for left-wing editorials, before gradually moving towards antisemitism and fascism throughout the 1930s, becoming editor of Je suis partout. After the occupation of France, Cousteau became a propagandist for the French State, under which he advocated for collaboration with Nazi Germany and supported the French Holocaust. After being held in prison from 1946 to 1953, Cousteau fell seriously ill and died at age 52 in Paris.

== Leftist activism ==
He was born in Saint-André-de-Cubzac, Gironde, and educated in the United States as well as the Lycée Louis-le-Grand. Cousteau served in the military before working as a translator and a meteorologist and for New York City's Credit Alliance Corporation. He became a journalist for left-wing papers such as Regards or Monde and was associated with pacifism and the Anti-Stalinist left.

== Move to fascism ==
Cousteau abandoned his communism in the early 1930s, and was drawn to antisemitism and authoritarian view, writing for Coup de Patte and then Je suis partout, becoming editor of the journal in 1932. In this role, he was close to Pierre Gaxotte, who converted him to fascism.

He visited Nazi Germany in 1936 with Robert Brasillach and Georges Blond and then Spain in 1938 with Brasillach and Maurice Bardèche. While the trips developed his fascist sympathies, his attendance at the Nuremberg Rally of 1937 left him with the opinion that Nazism was impressive but not without its flaws.

== Collaboration ==
Cousteau was recalled up to the army in 1939 and captured in 1940, although Brasillach secured his release and he returned to Je suis partout, eventually succeeding Brasillach as political director in 1943. A strong believer in collaboration, he sought internment for the Jews and justified his stance by stating in 1943 that "We are not opportunists. We remain just plain fascists". His other wartime roles included a spell as editor of Paris-Soir in 1941, service on the general secretariat of Milice from 1942 and a series of written works for journals such as Combats, the militant journal of Henry Charbonneau. He was particularly known for both his antisemitism and his anti-Americanism. In 1942, he produced the work L'Amérique juive in which he sought to demonstrate the United States was controlled by Jews who were bent on controlling the world.

In August 1944, he moved to Bad Mergentheim, where he helped run a French newspaper and radio station, before ultimately fleeing to Switzerland. Arrested at Innsbruck, he was condemned to death in November 1946, before the sentence was commuted to life with hard labour. Cousteau would later justify his collaboration by stating: "I wanted a German victory because it represented the last chance of the white man, while the democracies represented the end of the white man".

== Post-war activity ==
Released under an amnesty in 1953, he became editor of the extreme nationalist journal Rivarol, as well as contributing to Henry Coston's Lectures Françaises, Jeune Nation, Charivari, Dimanche-Matin and others. He was also associated with the minor Union des Intellectuels Indépendants movement. His brother Jacques, whose international profile was growing at the time, had begged Pierre-Antoine to retire from public life following his release from prison, but he refused, insisting that it was a matter of honor that he continue to agitate. In his post-war work Les lois de l'hospitalité he argued in favor of collaboration: "we [the collaborators] did not commit an error of judgement. There were just too many tanks and too many planes against us".

He fell seriously ill in the late 1950s and had to withdraw from politics, requiring regular blood transfusions to survive. He died in Paris.

== Publications ==
- L'Amérique juive. Les Éditions de France. 1942.
- Hugothérapie ou comment l'esprit vient aux mal-pensants. Bourg: Éditions E.T.L. 1954.
- Après le déluge, pamphlets. La Librairie Francaise. 1957.
- Les lois de l'hospitalité. La Librairie Francaise. 1957.
- En ce temps-là. La Librairie Francaise. 1959.

=== Posthumous ===
- (written Clairvaux Prison, January–December 1950), text prepared by Robert Belot, with the collaboration of Lucien Rebatet (1999). Dialogue de vaincus. Paris: Berg International.
- Proust digest, pref. Lucien Rebatet, Versailles, Via Romana, 119 p., 2014.
- Intra muros, pref. Ghislain de Diesbach, Versailles, Via Romana, 486 p., 2017.
- Pensées et aphorismes, introduction Jean-Pierre Cousteau, pref. Xavier Éman, Paris, La Nouvelle Librairie, coll. Éternel Retour, 122 p., 2021.
- Portraits et entrevues, pref. Pierre-Alexandre Bouclay, Versailles, Via Romana, 410 p., 2023 ISBN 978-2372711937
- Jehanne au trou, Paris, Éditions Livr'Arbitres, 160 p., 2023 ISBN 978-2494472006.
- Mon Amérique à moi : de la prohibition à l'après-guerre, Versailles, Via Romana, 335 p., 2025 ISBN 978-2-37271-274-3

== Bibliography ==
- Jean-Pierre Cousteau, Pierre-Antoine : l'autre Cousteau, Versailles, Via Romana, 2016 ISBN 978-2-37271-038-1
- Pierre-Marie Dioudonnat, Les 700 rédacteurs de « Je suis partout », éd. Sedopols, 1993
- Benoît Loeuillet (2001). Pierre-Antoine Cousteau. Un journaliste engagé (1932-1944). publications Henry Coston.
- Michaël Lenoire (1999). L'antisémitisme de plume. Paris: Berg International.
- Philip Rees. Biographical Dictionary of the Extreme Right Since 1890.
