= Frédéric Dumas =

French pioneer of scuba diving (1913–1991)

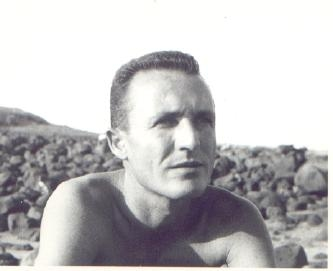
Frédéric Dumas in 1948.

Frédéric Dumas (14 January 1913 – 26 July 1991) was a French writer. He was part of a team of three, with Jacques-Yves Cousteau and Philippe Tailliez. Tailliez coined for them Mousquemers in allusion to Les Trois Mousquetaires (The Three Musketeers). They had a passion for diving, and developed the diving regulator with the aid of the engineer Émile Gagnan.

Dumas participated with Cousteau in the discovery of deep sea reliefs and flora and fauna of deep sea life and in bringing it to the attention of the general public.

== Biography ==
Frédéric Dumas was born on 14 January 1913 in Albi, France.

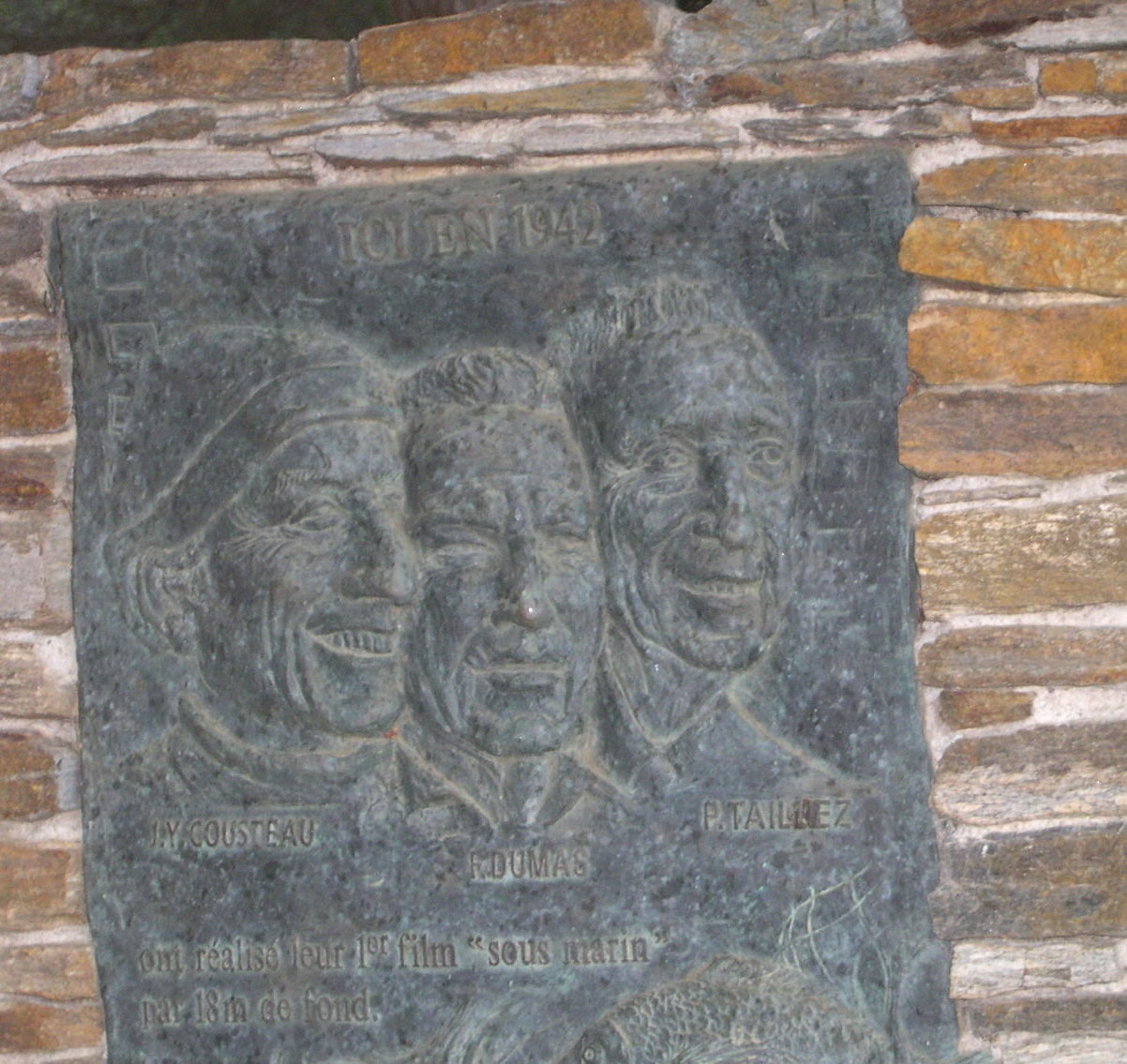
Plaque commemorating the filming of Par dix-huit mètres de fond with the Mousquemers: Cousteau, Dumas and Tailliez. Île du Gaou, Le Brusc, Six-Fours-les-Plages.

A pioneer of underwater fishing on the French Riviera, he met Philippe Tailliez and Jacques-Yves Cousteau in 1937 and his exploits served as a subject in Cousteau's first film Par dix-huit mètres de fond (Eighteen meters deep), made in 1942. He performed also in Cousteau's second film, Épaves (Wrecks) in 1943, the first featuring Aqua-Lungs developed in 1941 by Cousteau and Émile Gagnan. On October 17, 1943, he was the first to exceed a depth of 60 m (200 ft) with a Cousteau-Gagnan regulator to 62 m (203 ft). On the same dive, he was also the first scuba diver to suffer the effects of nitrogen narcosis.

Dumas was a dive leader aboard the RV Calypso, and co-author or actor in many films and stories from the Cousteau team.

In 1953 he co-authored with Cousteau their first book The Silent World: A Story of Undersea Discovery and Adventure. In 1956 he was one of the principal architects of the ground-breaking film The Silent World, in which his ballet with the grouper Ulysses (French: Jojo) is famous.

From 1945 to 1965, Dumas was also a civilian collaborator in the French Navy's Groupe d'Études et de Recherches Sous-Marines (GERS, Group for Underwater Studies and Research), which was set up by Cousteau and Taillez. After the death of Maurice Fargues in 1947 it was renamed to Centre Expert Plongée Humaine et Intervention Sous la MER (CEPHISMER, Expert Centre for Human Diving and Underwater Intervention).

In 1946, Cousteau and Dumas dove into the karstic spring of Vaucluse, the largest in France (with an average flow of 22 m^{3} / second and ranked fifth in the world with 110 m^{3} / second during snow melt), hoping to explain its annual flooding. Fargues was the operation's surface commander, in charge of the guide rope which allowed Cousteau and Dumas to communicate with the surface. When Cousteau and Dumas became affected by carbon dioxide poisoning due to a faulty compressor setup, Fargues saved their lives by pulling them back up to the surface. In 1947 he set a depth-record with 94 m (308 ft) in the Mediterranean Sea.

Dumas was one of the major players in the rescue of Professor Jacques Piccard's bathyscaphe, the FNRS II, during the 1949 expedition in Dakar. Thanks to this rescue, the French Navy could use the bathyscaphe's sphere in creating the FNRS III.

In 1950, he invented what he called the collerette de sécurité (safety collar), the first buoyancy compensator, already fitted with a compressed-air reserve separate from the main cylinders.

He was a founding member of the Sea Research Society and served on the Society's Board of Advisors. In 1972 Dumas participated in the creation of the research/professional degree of Doctor of Marine Histories.

After he retired from the GERS, he devoted himself particularly to undersea archaeology and was chairman of the archaeology committee of the Confédération Mondiale des Activités Subaquatiques (CMAS or World Underwater Activities Federation).

Frédéric Dumas died on 26 July 1991 in Toulon at the age of 78.

== Museum ==
Opened in 1994, the Frédéric Dumas Diving Museum is in a 13th-century Roman tower made available by the municipality of Sanary-sur-Mer where Cousteau had a Villa and that bills itself as an historical city of diving.

== Publications ==
- Deep-water Archaeology. London: Routledge and Kegan Paul (1962).
- Épaves antiques. Introduction à l'archéologie sous marine méditerranéenne. Paris. (1964).
