= The Odyssey (2016 film) =

French-Belgian biographical adventure film by Jérôme Salle

- Film poster
- L'Odyssée
- Directed by: Jérôme Salle
- Written by: Jérôme Salle; Laurent Turner
- Based on: Capitaine de La Calypso by Albert Falco and Jean-Michel Cousteau
- Produced by: Marc Missonnier; Olivier Delbosc; Nathalie Gastaldo; Philippe Godeau; Eric Vidart Loeb
- Starring: Lambert Wilson; Pierre Niney; Audrey Tautou
- Cinematography: Matias Boucard
- Edited by: Stan Collet
- Music by: Alexandre Desplat
- Production companies: Fidélité Films; Pan-Européenne; TF1 Films Production
- Distributed by: Wild Bunch
- Release dates: 23 August 2016 (Angoulême); 12 October 2016 (France)
- Running time: 122 minutes
- Countries: France; Belgium
- Language: French
- Budget: $22.5 million
- Box office: $9.8 million

The Odyssey (French title: L'Odyssée) is a 2016 French-Belgian biographical adventure film directed by Jérôme Salle and written by Salle and Laurent Turner, based on the non-fiction book Capitaine de La Calypso by Albert Falco and Yves Paccalet. The film stars Lambert Wilson, Pierre Niney, and Audrey Tautou.

== Premise ==
The film follows Jacques-Yves Cousteau, a French ocean-going adventurer, biologist, and filmmaker. It sticks to historical events, and was based on documentation and interviews with people who worked with Cousteau.

In 1949, Cousteau was an eccentric French naval officer, with a beautiful oceanside house, who wanted to be a pilot. But he quit the Navy to explore and document the ocean. His boat, Calypso, was a 1941 minesweeper. The film is a biopic covering aquatic adventures over thirty years. Cousteau is revealed to be an adventurer but also an inventor. He designed the autonomous regulator, but also had romantic views of colonising the sea. The film documents the decline of his finances and fortunes and banks pull out as the era of 'robotics' and automation begins as a more plausible financial investment than Cousteau's ideas of civilizations living under the sea. While he was influential and ambitious, he is revealed to be disloyal to his wife Simone, who remains on the Calypso year-round while Cousteau travels extensively. He conflicts with and is reconciled with his environmentalist son, Philippe, who is also a filmmaker. A major trip to Antarctica sees him working with his son and loyal crew, to make films he has promised to his investors and producing essential revenue as his business was failing. Cousteau is then shown garnering fame and travelling the world in the late 1970s. The death of Philippe on 28 June 1979, in a PBY Catalina flying boat crash in the Tagus river near Lisbon is the low point in Cousteau's life. Cousteau is shown to be a popularizer of the hidden wonders of the sea, and the person who raised the most awareness of the ocean and the need for environmental protection for many decades. His role in brokering the moratorium on resource exploitation in Antarctica is mentioned in the closing credits.

== Cast ==
- Lambert Wilson as Jacques-Yves Cousteau
- Pierre Niney as Philippe Cousteau
  - Ulysse Stein as young Philippe Cousteau
- Audrey Tautou as Simone Melchior Cousteau
- Laurent Lucas as Philippe Tailliez
- Benjamin Lavernhe as Jean-Michel Cousteau
  - Rafaël de Ferran as young Jean-Michel Cousteau
- Vincent Heneine as Albert "Bebert" Falco
- Thibault de Montalembert as Étienne Deshaies
- Roger Van Hool as Daddy
- Chloé Hirschman as Jan
- Adam Neill as David Wolper
- Olivier Galfione as Frédéric Dumas
- Martin Loizillon as Henri Plé
- Chloé Williams as Eugenie Clark

== Production ==
Principal photography on the film began on 7 September 2015 in Croatia, where filming took place on islands Hvar, Vis, and Biševo. Shooting was also done in South Africa, Antarctic, and The Bahamas, and it ended on 8 January 2016.

== Release ==
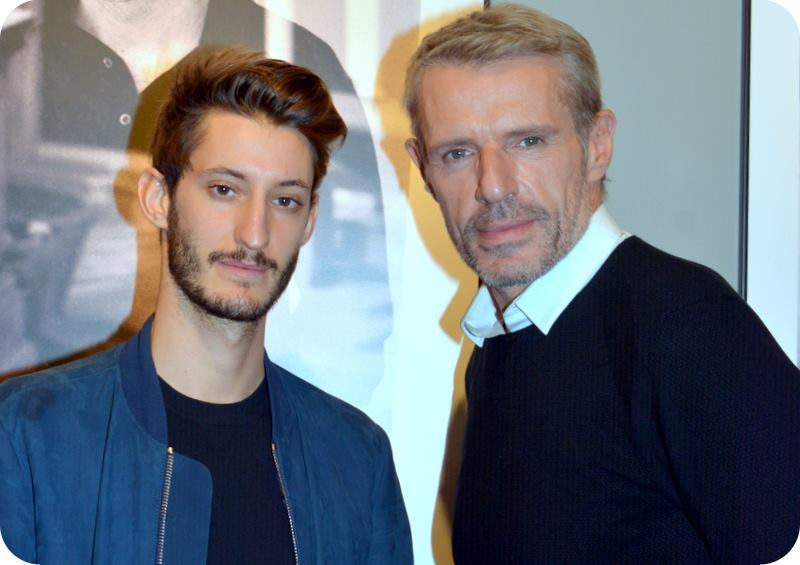
Lead actors Pierre Niney and Lambert Wilson at a premiere in October 2016.

In France, the film was released on 12 October 2016 by Wild Bunch.

== Reception ==
The film was regarded by critics and audiences as lacking direction and good character development. The undersea and Antarctica scenes were deemed to be stunning, and received an award. Rotten Tomatoes gave a score of 63% based on 19 reviews.

Award / Film Festival	Category	Recipients	Result
César Awards	Best Sound	Marc Engels, Fred Demolder, Sylvain Réty and Jean-Paul Hurier	Won
Globes de Cristal Awards	Best Actor	Lambert Wilson	Nominated
Globes de Cristal Awards	Best Actress	Audrey Tautou	Nominated
