= The Silent World: A Story of Undersea Discovery and Adventure =

Book by Jacques-Yves Cousteau and Frédéric Dumas

- Cover of The Silent World: A Story of Undersea Discovery and Adventure
- Author: Jacques-Yves Cousteau with Frédéric Dumas
- Language: English
- Publisher: Harper & Brothers Publishers
- Publication date: 1953
- Publication place: United States
- Media type: Hardback
- Pages: 266

The Silent World (subtitle: A story of undersea discovery and adventure, by the first men to swim at record depths with the freedom of fish) is a 1953 book co-authored by Captain Jacques-Yves Cousteau and Frédéric Dumas, and edited by James Dugan.

== Background ==
Although a French national, Cousteau wrote the book in English. Cousteau and Émile Gagnan designed, built, and tested the first "aqua-lung" in the summer of 1943, off the southern coast of France. In the opening chapters, Cousteau recounts the earliest days of scuba diving with his diving companions Frédéric Dumas and Philippe Tailliez. The aqualung allowed for the first time untethered, free-floating extended deep water diving, and ushered in the modern era of scuba diving. Later chapters include excursions diving to shipwrecks.

It was the basis of the Academy Award-winning documentary The Silent World (1956). It has been very successful; as of the book's 50th anniversary, it has been translated into some 22 languages and sold over 5 million copies, and is still in print, notably as a 2004 hardcover edition published by the National Geographic Society.

The book contains 48 pages of black-and-white photos by various photographers, and 16 pages of color photos, made available by National Geographic Magazine. The hand-held work in Ektachrome "is the first ever made in significant depths, using artificial light and scientific color correction."
