= Albert Falco =

French scuba diver, chief diver and captain of the Calypso

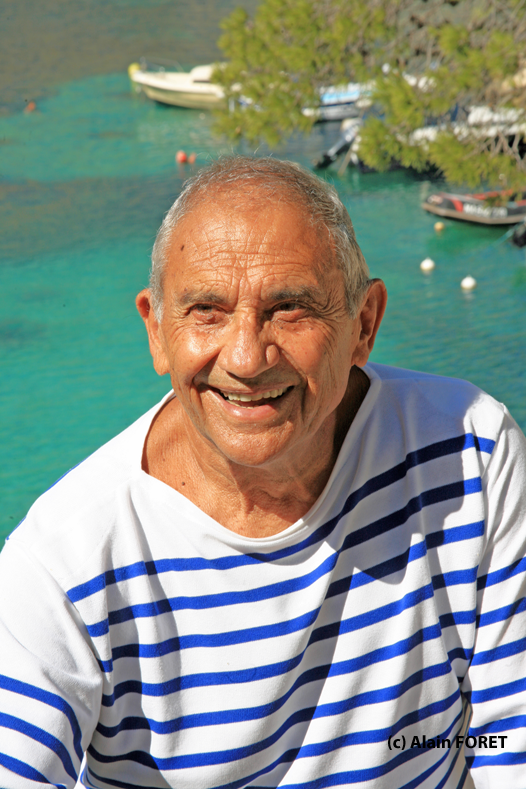
- Albert Falco in 2011 in Sormiou (Marseille, France)
- Born: 17 October 1927; Marseille, France
- Died: 21 April 2012 (aged 84); Marseille, France
- Occupation: Underwater SCUBA Diver
- Title: former Chief Diver and Captain of Calypso

Albert Falco
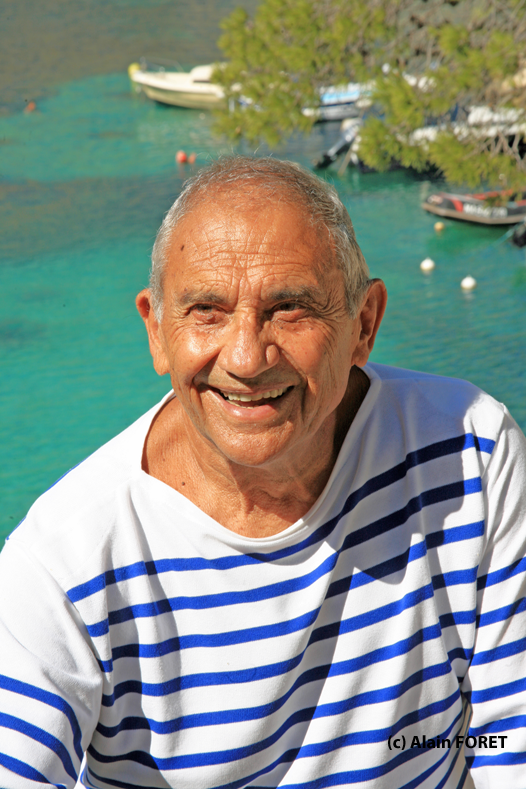
- Albert Falco in 2011 in Sormiou (Marseille, France)
- Born: 17 October 1927; Marseille, France
- Died: 21 April 2012 (aged 84); Marseille, France
- Occupations: Scuba diver, oceanographer, environmentalist
- Known for: Chief Diver and Captain of RV Calypso, Cousteau’s Précontinent experiments
- Title: former Chief Diver and Captain of Calypso
- Spouse: Maryvonne Falco
- Children: 1
- Awards: Chevalier de la Légion d’Honneur (2010)

Albert Falco (17 October 1927 – 21 April 2012) was a French scuba diving veteran and champion of underwater conservation. was one of the longest-serving diving companions of Jacques Cousteau, Chief Diver, and later Captain of the RV Calypso. He lived in France and was active in preserving aquatic ecosystems. He played several leading roles on Cousteau's films, like The Silent World (1956), World Without Sun (1964) and Voyage to the Edge of the World (1976). Falco was the author of a non-fiction book, Capitaine de La Calypso.

== Early life ==
=== Roles with Cousteau's team ===
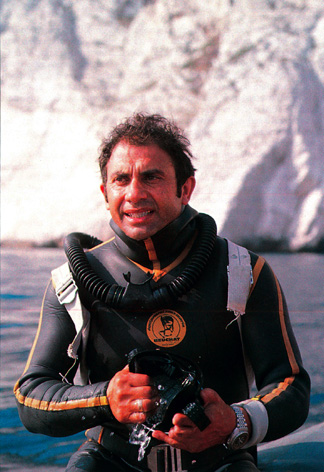
Albert Falco in 1975

=== Précontinent experiments ===
In 1962, during Précontinent I ("Diogène") off Marseille, Falco and Claude Wesly lived for seven days at 10 meters, becoming the first "oceanauts".

== Honors and recognition ==
- RV Calypso – Jacques Cousteau's oceanographic research ship
- Officier of the Ordre National du Mérite (1993)
- Officier of the Ordre du Mérite Sportif (1960)
- Chevalier of the Ordre du Mérite Maritime (1990)
