= Maurice Fargues =

French navy diver and first scuba fatality using aqualung for a depth record attempt

- Maurice Fargues before his fatal deep dive attempt.
- Born: April 23, 1913; Avignon, France
- Died: September 17, 1947 (aged 33–34); Toulon, France
- Known for: Diver

Maurice Fargues (April 23, 1913 – September 17, 1947) was a diver with the French Navy and a close associate of commander Philippe Tailliez and deputy commander Jacques Cousteau. In August 1946, Fargues saved the lives of Cousteau and Frédéric Dumas during their dive into the karstic spring of Vaucluse. On September 17, 1947, while attempting to set a new depth record, Maurice Fargues became the first diver to die using an Aqua-Lung.

== GRS and the Fountain of Vaucluse ==
In late 1945, Petty Officer Maurice Fargues joined the newly formed GRS (Groupement de Recherches Sous-marines, Underwater Research Group) of the French Navy in Toulon, commanded by Philippe Tailliez, with Cousteau as its deputy commander and Dumas as civilian adviser and chief diver. Dumas trained Fargues and the GRS' other two new recruits, Petty Officers Jean-Paul Pinard and Guy Morandière, as Aqua-Lung divers. Maurice Fargues became commander of the diving tender VP 8, a 21.9-meter (72-foot) twin-screw launch.

On August 27, 1946, the GRS dived into the Fountain of Vaucluse, a mysterious spring in the village of Vaucluse, hoping to discover the secret of its yearly flooding. Maurice Fargues was the operation's surface commander, in charge of the guide rope which allowed divers to communicate with the surface. Tailliez and Morandière dove together first, but they were rapidly affected by a narcosis that almost compromised their return to the surface. When Cousteau and Dumas dove together, they suffered the same symptoms, and Tailliez and Fargues probably saved their lives by pulling them back up to the surface. It was later determined that carbon monoxide had unexpectedly contaminated the air in their cylinders.

== Death ==
In September 1947, just before the "Salon Nautique" in Paris, Cousteau pushed to organize a series of deep diving attempts to determine the maximum depth a scuba diver could reach. On September 17, Maurice Fargues made the first deep diving attempt near the French Navy base at Toulon. Maurice Fargues descended an anchor line with marker slates attached at 10 metre intervals, allowing him to sign his name on them to certify the depth he had reached, and periodically tugged on a safety line attached to his weight belt to let his colleague Frédéric Dumas on the surface know that he was alive. After three minutes, at a record-setting depth of 120 metres (390 ft), Maurice Fargues stopped signalling. Philippe Tailliez ordered that he be pulled up, and Jean Pinard dove to meet him at 60 meters depth, only to discover that Fargues was unconscious, his mouthpiece hanging on his chest. Resuscitation attempts were continued for 12 hours, but Fargues was dead. Nitrogen narcosis or oxygen toxicity had caused him to lose his mouthpiece and drown.

Fargues' scrawled signature on the slate at 120 metres (390 ft) confirmed his depth record. The GRS concluded that 90 metres (300 ft) was the maximum depth a diver using compressed air could reach. In the words of Jacques Cousteau: "Dumas and I owed our lives to Maurice Fargues, who had resurrected us from the death cave at Vaucluse. We will not be consoled that we were unable to save him."

== Legacy ==
On September 17, 2007, the 60th anniversary of Fargues' death, a room was dedicated in his honor as the "Salle Maurice Fargues" at the Musée International de la Plongée Frédéric Dumas in Sanary-sur-Mer, France. Fargues' children, Roselyne and Louis Fargues, were present at the ceremony. The room contains a plaque bearing a photograph of Fargues taken before his final dive and a reproduction of his final scrawled signature.

On October 18, 2012, a conference "Hommage à Maurice FARGUES La mer est calme, le ciel est clair". YouTube. 24 November 2012. was given by Bernard Tailliez, son of Commander Philippe Tailliez, as part of a series of lectures entitled Les fils de Philippe Tailliez - 10 ans après, organised by the Service historique de la Défense at the Escale Castigneau (Military port of Toulon), honoring the memory of Philippe Tailliez, Petty Officer Maurice Fargues and the birth of the GRS. Fargues' children, Roselyne and Louis Fargues, were present at the ceremony.
