= The Ocean World of Jacques Cousteau =

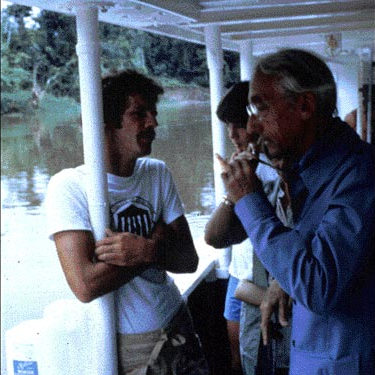
Cousteau on Calypso

The Ocean World of Jacques Cousteau by Jacques Cousteau is an encyclopedia in 21 volumes, that forms an encyclopedia of marine life.

It was published between 1973 and 1978.

== List of books ==
1. Oasis in Space
2. The Act of Life
3. Quest for Food
4. Window in the Sea
5. The Art of Motion
6. Attack and Defense
7. Invisible Messages
8. Instinct and Intelligence
9. Pharaohs of the Sea
10. Mammals in the Sea
11. Provinces of the Sea
12. Man Re-Enters Sea
13. A Sea of Legends
14. Adventure of Life
15. Outer and Inner Space
16. The Whitecaps
17. Riches of the Sea
18. Challenges of the Sea
19. The Sea in Danger
20. Guide to the Sea and Index
21. Calypso
