= Philippe Diolé =

French author and undersea explorer

Philippe Victor Diolé (Saint-Maur-des-Fossés, August 24, 1908 – Paris, November 12, 1977) was a French author and undersea explorer.

Diolé was born in Saint-Maur-des-Fossés, Val-de-Marne, France, son of Marcel (a jurist) and Elizabeth (Legrand) Diolé. He received a Licence en Droit (a law degree) from the University of Paris in 1928. He married Marguerite Monsenergue on July 6, 1953.

With Jacques-Yves Cousteau he co-authored 7 of the 8-volume series The Undersea Discoveries of Jacques-Yves Cousteau (1970-1975) and co-authored The Whale (1987), which was released posthumously.

In 1977, shortly before his death, Philippe Diolé was co-founder in Paris of the LFDA foundation (La Fondation Droit Animal), aimed to defend animal rights.

== Bibliography ==
- 1949: Sous les plis du drapeau noir ('Under the Black Flag', not translated into English)
- 1951: L'Aventure sous-marine (The Undersea Adventure, 1953)
- 1952: Promenades d'archéologie sous-marine (4,000 Years Under the Sea: Excursions in Undersea Archeology, 1954)
- 1953: Les Portes de la mer (The Gates of the Sea: The Seas of Sicily, 1955)
- 1954: L'Exploration sous-marine (Underwater Exploration: A History, 1954)
- 1954: Au bord de la terre : Fragments de la vie d'un plongeur ('Beside the Seaside: Fragments of a Diver's Life', not translated into English)
- 1954: Les Paysages de la mer, de la surface a l'abîme ('The Sea Landscapes: From the Surface to the Abyss', not translated into English)
- 1955: Le Plus Beau Désert du monde (1956 in the USA: Sahara Adventure. 1959 in the UK: The Most Beautiful Desert of All)
- 1956: Dans le Fezzan inconnu ('In the Unknown Fezzan', not translated into English)
- 1956: Le Trésor du banc d'argent ('The Treasure of the Silver Bank', not translated into English)
- 1958: Du ciel à la stratosphère ('From the Sky to the Stratosphere', not translated into English)
- 1959: L'Eau profonde : Roman ('The Deep Water: A Novel', not translated into English)
- 1963: L'Okapi: Roman Editions Gallimard (Okapi Fever: A Novel, 1965, Viking Press, Translation: Peter Green)
- 1965: Chasse d'Afrique ('Big Game in Africa', not translated into English)
- In the collection The Undersea Discoveries of Jacques-Yves Cousteau (Flammarion, 1970–75) seven volumes of the whole collection were co-authored by Diolé and simultaneously published in English and French (Cousteau co-authored the first volume with his son Philippe; all other seven volumes were co-authored with Diolé):

1. 1970: Les Requins (The Shark: Splendid Savage of the Sea)
2. 1971: Un Trésor englouti (Diving for Sunken Treasure)
3. 1971: La Vie et la mort des coraux (Life and Death in a Coral Sea)
4. 1972: Nos Amies les baleines (The Whale: Mighty Monarch of the Sea)
5. 1973: Trois Aventures de la Calypso (Three Adventures: Galápagos, Titicaca, the Blue Holes)
6. 1973: Pieuvres, la fin d'un malentendu (Octopus and Squid: The Soft Intelligence)
7. 1974: Compagnons de plongée (Diving Companions: Sea Lion, Elephant Seal, Walrus)
8. 1975: Les Dauphins et la liberté (Dolphins)

- 1974: Les Animaux malades de l'homme (The Errant Ark... Man's Relationship With Animals, 1974)
- 1975: Lettres au Président de la République sur la mort des Français ('Letters to the President of the Republic concerning the Death of the French', not translated into English)
- 1976: Les Oubliés du Pacifique (The Forgotten People of the Pacific, 1977)
- 1976: Falco, chef plongeur de la Calypso (The Memoirs of Falco: Chief Diver of the Calypso, 1977), with Albert Falco
- 1977: L'Aventure de l'homme dans la mer ('The Adventure of Mankind into the Sea', not translated into English)
- 1987: The Whale (with Cousteau, posthumous)
