= Voyage to the Edge of the World =

1976 French nature documentary

- Film poster
- Directed by: Jacques-Yves Cousteau, Philippe Cousteau and Marshall Flaum
- Written by: Jacques-Yves Cousteau and Philippe Cousteau
- Produced by: Les Requins associés
- Starring: Jacques-Yves Cousteau, Philippe Cousteau, Albert Falco, Michel Laval
- Narrated by: Jacques-Yves Cousteau and Philippe Cousteau
- Cinematography: Philippe Cousteau and Colin Mounier
- Edited by: Hedwige Bienvenu
- Music by: Maurice Ravel pieces conducted by Serge Baudo
- Release dates: September 1, 1976 (USA); November 17, 1976 (France)
- Running time: 93 minutes
- Country: France
- Language: French

Voyage to the Edge of the World (French: Voyage au bout du monde) is a 1976 French nature documentary film directed by Jacques-Yves Cousteau, his son Philippe Cousteau and Marshall Flaum. The film follows a four-month expedition through Antarctica undertaken between the end of 1972 and the beginning of 1973. It was Cousteau's third and last full-length film, following The Silent World (1956) and World Without Sun (1964). As a difference with those two earlier Cousteau films, both mainly narrated by Jacques-Yves Cousteau himself, on this film Jacques-Yves' voice-over alternates with co-director Philippe Cousteau's voice.

== Plot ==
In December 1972 The Cousteau Society sets out on a four-months expedition through Antarctica. The expedition is supported by Monaco's Oceanographic Museum and the La Rochelle Natural History Museum, the latter represented on board by Raymond Duguy (1927 - 2012), its director at the time.

Divers and scientists of the expedition observe the fauna and the ice formations of the frozen continent. Footage is filmed on board the Calypso but also on land (for example at Deception Island), underwater, over sea ice or from the air, by means of a hot air balloon and a helicopter. Voyage to the Edge of the World was the first film to show underwater footage taken from the submerged inside of glaciers or icebergs. It also was the first film to show high depth footage in Antarctic waters (thanks to the diving saucer SP-350 Denise).

Paleontologist Michel Laval, Calypso's Chief Mate, died on Deception Island, 29 December 1972, when he was struck by the tail propeller of the helicopter of the expedition.

== See also ==
- The Silent World – 1956 French documentary film co-directed by Jacques Cousteau and Louis Malle
- World Without Sun – 1964 film by Jacques Cousteau
