= Philippe Tailliez =

French pioneer of scuba diving and underwater photographer

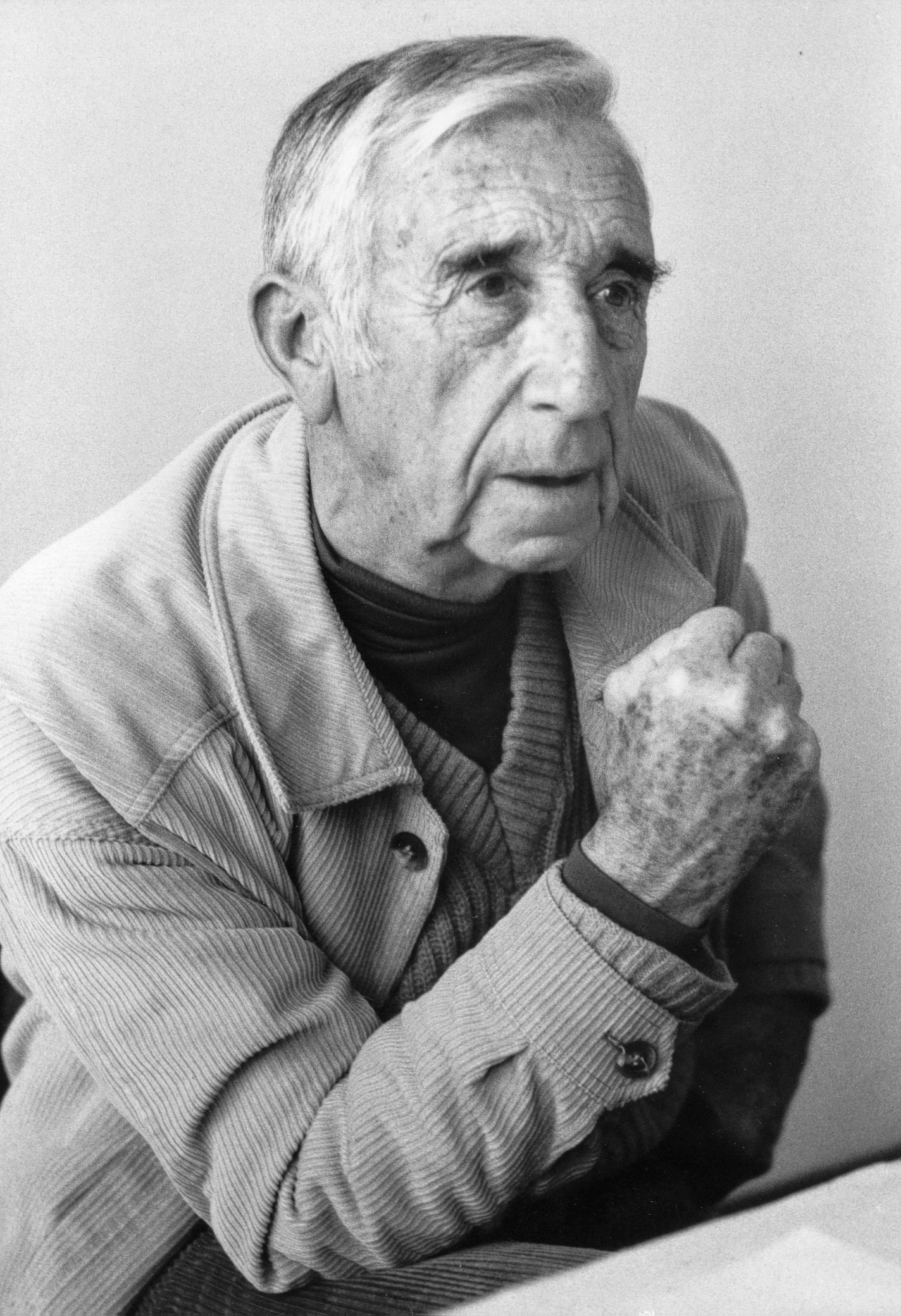
Philippe Tailliez

Philippe Tailliez (French: [tɑje]; 15 June 1905 in Malo-les-Bains – 26 September 2002 in Toulon, France) was a friend and colleague of Jacques Cousteau. He was an underwater pioneer, who had been diving since the 1930s.

== Biography ==
He was the younger son of Félix Tailliez, a career sailor then in station in Tahiti, told in his letters the stories of pearl divers, which fascinated Philippe (who had a brother, Jean, sailor also, and a sister, Monique). Philippe Taillez left the naval college in 1924, was affected in Toulon. He became a career naval officer. He became passionate about underwater breath-holding, hunting and photography, and became the French Navy's swimming champion. Inspired by the philosophy of the Swiss naturalist Jacques Grob, whom he met in Carqueiranne where he lived, of gardening and underwater fishing, he already took heed of the fragility of the sea: "the fertile coastal belt, rich in colors and in fish", he wrote in 1937, "is not broader than a river.". Officer on the destroyer Condorcet, Tailliez made the acquaintance of a young ensign of the vessel with whom he later discovered diving and nature: the gunner Jacques-Yves Cousteau.

In 1936 he introduced Cousteau, while both were officers on the Condorcet, to the sport of spearfishing and two years later to Frédéric Dumas, another diving companion. These three men would start the history of deep-sea diving.

Passionate about cinema and owner of a camera, Cousteau dreamed of making underwater films at once, but for lack of time the dream spent several years to be carried out, and the German Hans Hass made the first underwater film in the Antilles in 1939. Tailliez acquired a passion for free-diving and underwater photography.

In the summer and autumn of 1943 he aided Cousteau in testing the prototype of the aqualung, making about five hundred dives, gradually going to deeper depths. These three divers would become known as the three mousquemers (musketeers of the sea).

The Second World War separated their team temporarily and Tailliez in particular would take part at the time of the campaign in Syria, with naval action against the Vichy navy.

On armistice leave and thus having time, in 1942 they made without breathing apparatus the first French underwater film: Par dix-huit mètres de fond (= "18 meters deep"), and the next year Epaves (= "Wrecks"), this time with the Cousteau-Gagnan aqualung, and with the funds of the Marseilles company of reinflation "Marcellin". In the wartime shortages, to get movie film to make Epaves, Cousteau had to buy up hundreds of unexposed short small-gauge films intended for children's toy cameras, and splice them end-to-end into movie-length reels.

In 1945, the Gaullist admiral Lemonnier, having viewed this film, entrusted to Tailliez the direction of the G.R.S. (Group of Underwater Research) (which in 1950 became the G.E.R.S. (Group of Studies and Underwater Research), and is now CEPHISMER - CEllule Plongée Humaine et Intervention Sous la MER). He had Cousteau and Dumas assigned there, and obtained a ship, the sloop "Elie Monnier". Admiral Lemonnier appointed him as the first commanding officer of the Elie Monnier, with which the three made innumerable missions of mine clearance, underwater exploration, physiological tests (discovering the principle of the diving tables), of underwater archaeology (in Mahdia in Tunisia) and of supporting the first bathyscaphes of Professor Jacques Piccard: the FNRS II in 1949 in Dakar.

At the same time they started their underwater exploration and archaeological finds off the coast of Mahdia, Tunisia. They did physiological tests, discovering the principle of diving tables.

In 1949 they helped Auguste Piccard off the coast of the Cape Verde Islands with his prototype of the bathyscaphe FNRS-2. Tailliez has described these adventures in his book Plongées sans câble (Diving without a cable).

These adventures are told in the book of Philippe Tailliez "Plongées sans câble" ("Dives without cable") and in the book of James Dugan, Frederic Dumas and Jacques-Yves Cousteau "Le Monde du silence" ("The Silent World") (former to film of the same name). In 1949, Philippe Taillez was sent to French Indo-China, where he was involved in combat diving during the anti-colonial rebellion there, leaving the direction of the G.E.R.S. to Cousteau and Jean Alinat.

On his return to France, Taillez began, together with Hans Sellner, the development of the Aquarius, a new type of bathyscaphe that used liquid air to float; the previous bathyscaphe used a big bag full of petrol as a float. Through lack of financial support, they could not make it technically perfect and their prototype sank during the first test.

On 20 January 1955 he was designated Commander of the Northern Rhine Flotilla and of the building base "the Vosges" at Koblenz-Bingen in Germany and took its command with the centre of the Maritime Forces of the Rhine on April 24. President Nasser's plan to nationalize the Suez Canal in 1956, involved the Franco-English reaction of November 1956, marked Commander Tailliez deeply. He was also responsible for a part of a crawling "channel" of life, the Rhine, an artery essential for the economic welfare of his residents whose traffic is equivalent to that of Suez Canal: 100 million tons! He was soon joined there by the leading seaman Elies, who had been, in the Far East, one of the most solid monitors of his section of underwater intervention. Elies arrived to form, then to direct, the underwater intervention group, which obviously, was lacking with the flotilla. The binomial Taillez - Elies carried out 222 April 1956 the first dive in the pit of the narrows of Binger Loch, the deepest place in the Rhine. Taillez told about this dive in an article of the Maritime Review special number 172 of Christmas 1960, entitled "Dive in the Lorelei". On 1 August 1956, he left this Command to join a new assignment close to the diving at the edges of the Mediterranean.

At the same time he conducted several underwater archaeological explorations.

In 1960 he retired from the French Navy. From then on he devoted himself to the protection of the sea from environmental pollution. In 1964 he was a founding member of the scientific committee of the Port-Cros National Park. In 1982 he became the president of the GRAN (Groupe de Recherche en Archéologie Navale). He was, from 1960 to 1963, the president of the technical commission of the Fédération française d'études et de sports sous-marins (French association for underwater studies and sports). He was also one of the founding member of the Confédération Mondiale des Activités Subaquatiques (World Underwater Federation).

Philippe Tailliez is considered one of the fathers of modern deep-sea diving. He inspired Cousteau to his environmental consciousness. He was given many awards in France and abroad, for his multiple contributions.

From 1960 to 1963 Philippe Tailliez was president of the National Technical Commission of the FFESSM and one of the founder members of the CMAS (World Confederation of the Subaqueous Activities).

He was at the same time in underwater archaeology and led many sites with the assistance of the Management of underwater archaeological research and Navy. He chaired, as of his creation (1982), the GRAN (Group of Research in Naval Archaeology).

After retiring in 1960, he worked on marine environmental protection. He was a founder member of the scientific Committee of the national park of Port-Cros, and of the Paul Ricard Oceanographical Institute.

Considered the modern "father of deep-sea diving" and the inspirer of the environmental conscience of Cousteau, Philippe Tailliez received many honors, in France and abroad.

== Movies ==
In 1943 he was awarded, with Cousteau and Dumas, the first prize ex-aequo on the Congrès du film documentaire for the first French underwater film Par dix-huit mètres de fond (Eighteen meters deep), shot the year before. He was awarded, again together with Cousteau and Dumas, the CIDALC Prize at the 1946 Cannes Film Festival for their film Epaves (shipwrecks).

== Bibliography ==
Books in French about Philippe Tailliez:

- Philippe Tailliez, le père de la plongée. Patrick Mouton, Glénat, 1993.
- Philippe Tailliez, pionnier de la plongée . les cahiers d océanorama, inst P.Ricard, 1995.

He was the author of several books :

=== In French ===
- La plongée en scaphandre, co-authors : Ph. Tailliez, F.Dumas, J.Y. Cousteau, J. Alinat, F. Devilla, Ed. Elzevir, 1949. First manual dedicated to diving in an atmospheric diving suit
- La plongée, co-authors : Ph. Tailliez, F. Dumas, J.Y. Cousteau, J. alinat, F. Devilla, Ed. Arthaud, 1955. Reissues in 1960 and 1967
- Plongées sans câbles, Philippe Tailliez, Ed. Arthaud, 1954. Prix Nautilus
- Nouvelles plongées sans câbles, Ed. Arthaud, 1960
- Aquarius, Philippe Tailliez, Ed. France Empire, 1961. Prix de l'Académie de Marine
- Nouvelles plongées sans câbles (1943 à 1966), Ed. Arthaud, 1967
- Plongée sans câbles, Ed. Edisud, 1998

=== In English ===
- To Hidden Depths; E. P. Dutton & Company, Inc., New York: 1954
- The complete manual of free diving; Putnam, 1957
- Aquarius; Harrap, 1964

== Honors and awards ==
- Commander of the Order of Legion of Honour
- Officer of the Ordre National du Mérite
