= Undersea Adventure =

1993 video game

- Developer: Knowledge Adventure
- Publishers: Knowledge Adventure, IBM
- Platforms: Windows, MS-DOS
- Release: December 13, 1993
- Genre: Educational software
- Mode: Single player

Undersea Adventure is an educational software program developed by Knowledge Adventure, released in 1993.

== Features ==
The software functions as an interactive encyclopedia with information on a wide variety of different oceans and its species, as well as a brief biography of the explorer Jacques Cousteau. The program's main attraction is the Undersea Reference, an extensive underwater-themed encyclopedia with images and passages from the Random House Atlas of the Oceans by Mitchell Beazley and National Geographic among others.

== History ==
The program was included along with Packard Bell and IBM Aptiva PCs. It was packaged with a pair of 3D glasses and bundled released with Space Adventure, Imax's Speed and Knowledge Adventure demo of the adventure games with a Packard Bell Windows 3.1/MS-DOS 6.22.

=== Digital re-release ===
On November 25, 2014, five Knowledge Adventure titles were re-released digitally as DRM-Free exclusives on ZOOM-Platform.com including Undersea Adventure through a partnership between JumpStart and the Jordan Freeman Group. The five titles were 3D Body Adventure, 3D Dinosaur Adventure, Dinosaur Adventure (original), Space Adventure and Undersea Adventure. More Knowledge Adventure titles are said to be on the way to be exclusively hosted on ZOOM-Platform.com.
