= Jacques Cousteau =

French oceanographer and author (1910–1997)

Jacques Cousteau AC
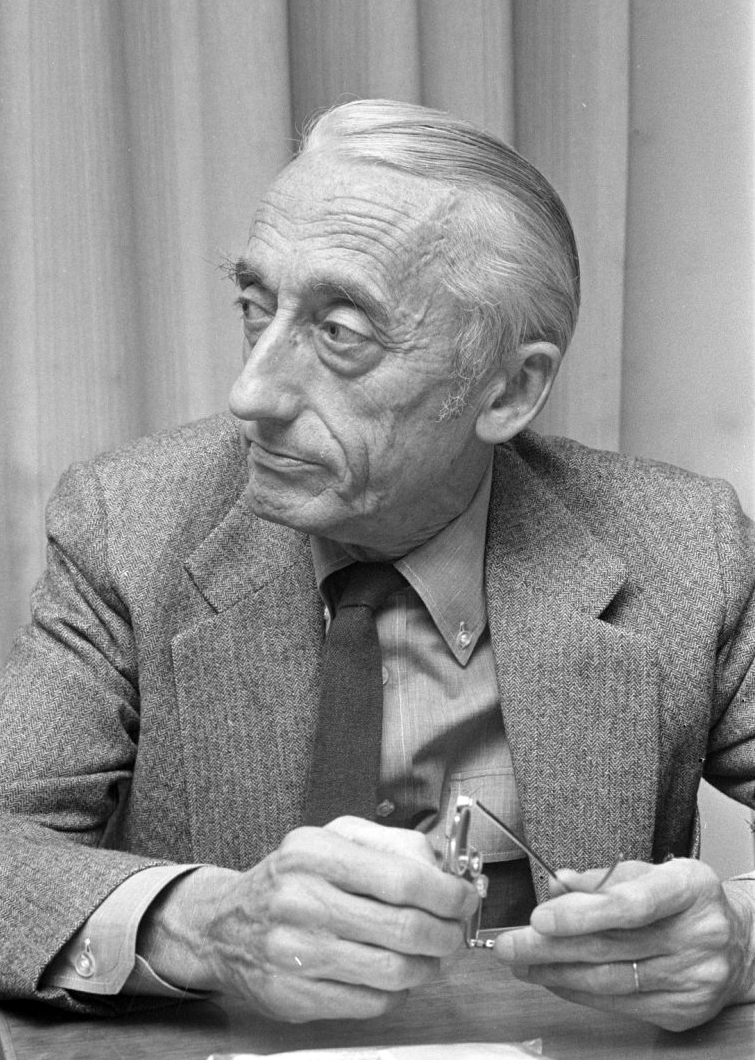
- Cousteau in 1972
- Born: Jacques-Yves Cousteau; 11 June 1910; Saint-André-de-Cubzac, Gironde, France
- Died: 25 June 1997 (aged 87); Paris, France
- Occupation: Oceanographer
- Spouses: Simone Melchior (m. 1937; died 1990); Francine Triplet (m. 1991)
- Children: Jean-Michel; Philippe-Pierre; Diane; Pierre-Yves
- Relatives: Pierre-Antoine Cousteau (brother); Fabien Cousteau (grandson); Céline Cousteau (granddaughter); Alexandra Cousteau (granddaughter); Philippe Cousteau Jr. (grandson)
- Awards: Palme d'Or at Cannes; Legion of Honour – Commander (1972)

The Cousteau Society logo depicts the nymph Calypso, the namesake of his research vessel, also used as its house flag.

Jacques-Yves Cousteau (/kuːˈstoʊ/, also UK: /ˈkuːstoʊ/; French: [ʒak iv kusto]; 11 June 1910 – 25 June 1997) was a French naval officer, oceanographer, filmmaker and author. He co-invented the first successful open-circuit self-contained underwater breathing apparatus (SCUBA), called the Aqua-Lung, which assisted him in producing some of the first underwater documentaries.

Cousteau wrote many books describing his undersea explorations. In his first book, The Silent World: A Story of Undersea Discovery and Adventure, Cousteau surmised the existence of the echolocation abilities of porpoises. The book was adapted into an underwater documentary called The Silent World. Co-directed by Cousteau and Louis Malle, it was one of the first films to use underwater cinematography to document the ocean depths in color. The film won the 1956 Palme d'Or at the Cannes Film Festival and remained the only documentary to do so until 2004 (when Fahrenheit 9/11 received the award). It was also awarded the Academy Award for Best Documentary in 1957.

From 1966 to 1976, he hosted The Undersea World of Jacques Cousteau, a documentary television series. A second documentary series, The Cousteau Odyssey, ran from 1977 to 1982 on public television stations.

== Biography ==
"The sea, the great unifier, is man's only hope. Now, as never before, the old phrase has a literal meaning: We are all in the same boat."

— Jacques Cousteau

=== Early life ===
Cousteau was born on 11 June 1910, in Saint-André-de-Cubzac, Gironde, France, to Daniel Cousteau and Élisabeth Duranthon. He had one brother, Pierre-Antoine. Cousteau completed his preparatory studies at the Collège Stanislas in Paris. In 1930, he entered the École navale and graduated as a gunnery officer. However, an automobile accident, which broke both his arms, cut short his career in naval aviation. The accident forced Cousteau to change his plans to become a naval pilot, so he then indulged his passion for the ocean.

In Toulon, where he was serving on the Condorcet, Cousteau carried out his first underwater experiments, thanks to his friend Philippe Tailliez who in 1936 lent him some Fernez underwater goggles, predecessors of modern swimming goggles. Cousteau also belonged to the information service of the French Navy, and was sent on missions to Shanghai and Japan (1935–1938) and in the USSR (1939).

On 12 July 1937, he married Simone Melchior, his business partner, with whom he had two sons, Jean-Michel (born 1938) and Philippe (1940–1979). His sons took part in the adventures of the Calypso. In 1991, six months after his wife Simone's death from cancer, he married Francine Triplet. They already had a daughter Diane Cousteau (born 1980) and a son, Pierre-Yves Cousteau (born 1982, during Cousteau's marriage to his first wife).

=== Early 1940s: innovation of modern underwater diving ===
The years of World War II were decisive for the history of diving. After the armistice of 1940, the family of Simone and Jacques-Yves Cousteau took refuge in Megève, where he became a friend of the Ichac family who also lived there. Jacques-Yves Cousteau and Marcel Ichac shared the same desire to reveal to the general public unknown and inaccessible places—for Cousteau the underwater world and for Ichac the high mountains. The two neighbors took the first ex-aequo prize of the Congress of Documentary Film in 1943, for the first French underwater film: Par dix-huit mètres de fond (18 meters deep), made without breathing apparatus the previous year in the Embiez islands in Var, with Philippe Tailliez and Frédéric Dumas, using a depth-pressure-proof camera case developed by mechanical engineer Léon Vèche, an engineer of Arts and Measures at the Naval College.

In 1943, they made the film Épaves (Shipwrecks), in which they used two of the very first Aqua-Lung prototypes. These prototypes were made in Boulogne-Billancourt by the Air Liquide company, following instructions from Cousteau and Émile Gagnan.

Having kept bonds with the English speakers (he spent part of his childhood in the United States and usually spoke English) and with French soldiers in North Africa (under Admiral Lemonnier), Jacques-Yves Cousteau (whose villa "Baobab" at Sanary (Var) was opposite Admiral Darlan's villa "Reine"), helped the French Navy to join again with the Allies; he assembled a commando operation against the Italian espionage services in France, and received several military decorations for his deeds. At that time, he kept his distance from his brother Pierre-Antoine Cousteau, a "pen anti-semite" who edited the collaborationist newspaper Je suis partout (I am everywhere) and who received the death sentence in 1946. However, this was later commuted to a life sentence, and Pierre-Antoine was released in 1954.

During the 1940s, Cousteau is credited with improving the Aqua-Lung design which gave birth to the open-circuit scuba technology used today. According to his first book, The Silent World: A Story of Undersea Discovery and Adventure (1953), Cousteau started diving with Fernez goggles in 1936, and in 1939 used the self-contained underwater breathing apparatus invented in 1926 by Commander Yves le Prieur. Cousteau was not satisfied with the length of time he could spend underwater with the Le Prieur apparatus so he improved it to extend underwater duration by adding a demand regulator, invented in 1942 by Émile Gagnan. In 1943 Cousteau tried out the first prototype Aqua-Lung which finally made extended underwater exploration possible. In 1994, Hans Hass publicly claimed priority for the first use of a mobile, self-contained diving apparatus and made this clear to Jacques-Yves Cousteau.

=== Late 1940s: GERS and Élie Monnier ===
In 1946, Cousteau and Tailliez showed the film Épaves ("Shipwrecks") to Admiral Lemonnier, who gave them the responsibility of setting up the GRS (Groupement de Recherches Sous-marines, Underwater Research Group) of the French Navy in Toulon. A little later it became the GERS (Groupe d'Études et de Recherches Sous-Marines, Underwater Studies and Research Group), then the COMISMER (Commandement des Interventions Sous la Mer, Undersea Interventions Command), and finally the CEPHISMER (Centre Expert Plongée Humaine et Intervention Sous la Mer, Expert Centre for Human Diving and Undersea Intervention). In 1947, Chief Petty Officer Maurice Fargues became the first diver to die using an Aqua-Lung, while attempting a new depth record to 120 m with the GERS near Toulon.

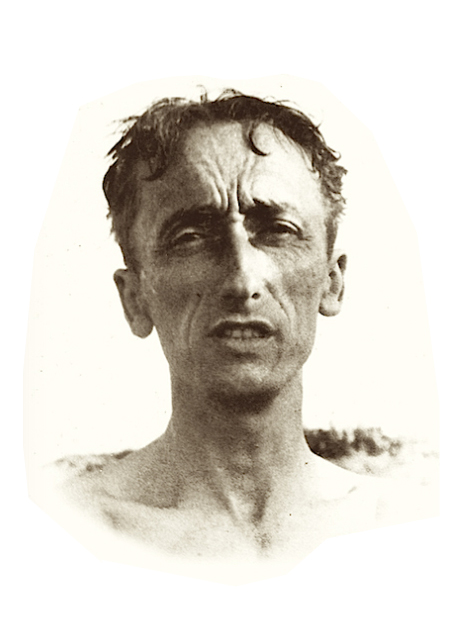
Jacques-Yves Cousteau in 1948

In 1948, between missions of mine clearance, underwater exploration and technological and physiological tests, Cousteau undertook a first campaign in the Mediterranean on board the sloop Élie Monnier, with Philippe Tailliez, Frédéric Dumas, Jean Alinat and the scenario writer Marcel Ichac. The small team also undertook the exploration of the Roman wreck of Mahdia (Tunisia). It was the first underwater archaeology operation using autonomous diving, opening the way for scientific underwater archaeology. Cousteau and Marcel Ichac brought back from there the Carnets diving film (presented and preceded with the Cannes Film Festival 1951).

Cousteau and the Élie Monnier then took part in the rescue of Professor Jacques Piccard's bathyscaphe, the FNRS-2, during the 1949 expedition to Dakar. Thanks to this rescue, the French Navy was able to reuse the sphere of the bathyscaphe to construct the FNRS-3.

The adventures of this period are told in the two books The Silent World (1953, by Cousteau and Dumas) and Plongées sans câble (1954, by Philippe Tailliez).

=== 1950–1970s ===
In 1949, Cousteau left the French Navy.

In 1950, he founded the French Oceanographic Campaigns (FOC), and leased a ship called Calypso from Thomas Loel Guinness for a symbolic one franc a year. Cousteau refitted the Calypso as a mobile laboratory for field research and as his principal vessel for diving and filming. He also carried out underwater archaeological excavations in the Mediterranean, in particular at Grand-Congloué (1952).

With the publication of his first book in 1953, The Silent World, Cousteau correctly predicted the existence of the echolocation abilities of porpoises. He reported that his research vessel, the Élie Monier, was heading to the Straits of Gibraltar and noticed a group of porpoises following them. Cousteau changed course a few degrees off the optimal course to the center of the strait, and the porpoises followed for a few minutes, then diverged toward mid-channel again. It was evident that they knew where the optimal course lay, even if the humans did not. Cousteau concluded that the cetaceans had something like sonar, which was a relatively new feature on submarines.

In 1954, Cousteau conducted a survey of Abu Dhabi waters on behalf of British Petroleum. Among those accompanying him was Louis Malle who made a black-and-white film of the expedition for the company. Cousteau won the Palme d'Or at the Cannes Film Festival in 1956 for The Silent World co-produced with Malle. In 1957, Cousteau took over as leader of the Oceanographic Museum of Monaco. Afterward, with the assistance of Jean Mollard, he made a "diving saucer" SP-350, an experimental underwater vehicle which could reach a depth of 350 meters. The successful experiment was quickly repeated in 1965 with two vehicles which reached 500 meters.

In 1957, he was elected as director of the Oceanographic Museum of Monaco. He directed Précontinent, about the experiments of diving in saturation (long-duration immersion, houses under the sea), and was admitted to the United States National Academy of Sciences.

He was involved in the creation of Confédération Mondiale des Activités Subaquatiques and served as its inaugural president from 1959 to 1973.

Cousteau also took part in inventing the "SP-350 Denise Diving Saucer" in 1959 which was an invention best for exploring the ocean floor, as it allowed one to explore on solid ground.

In October 1960, a large amount of radioactive waste was going to be discarded in the Mediterranean Sea by the Commissariat à l'énergie atomique (CEA). The CEA argued that the dumps were experimental in nature, and that French oceanographers such as Vsevolod Romanovsky had recommended it. Romanovsky and other French scientists, including Louis Fage and Jacques Cousteau, repudiated the claim, saying that Romanovsky had in mind a much smaller amount. The CEA claimed that there was little circulation (and hence little need for concern) at the dump site between Nice and Corsica, but French public opinion sided with the oceanographers rather than with the CEA atomic energy scientists. The CEA chief, Francis Perrin, decided to postpone the dump. Cousteau organized a publicity campaign which in less than two weeks gained wide popular support. The train carrying the waste was stopped by women and children sitting on the railway tracks, and it was sent back to its origin.

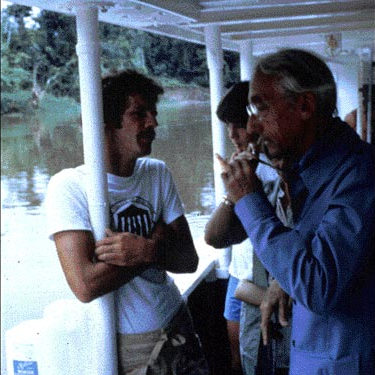
Cousteau on the Calypso

In the 1960s, Cousteau was involved with a set of three projects to build underwater "villages"; the projects were named Precontinent I, Precontinent II and Precontinent III. Each ensuing project was aimed at increasing the depth at which people continuously lived under water, and were an attempt at creating an environment in which men could live and work on the seafloor. The projects are best known as Conshelf I (1962), Conshelf II (1963), and Conshelf III (1965). The names "Precontinent", and "Continental Shelf Station" (Conshelf) were used interchangeably by Cousteau.

A meeting with American television companies (ABC, Metromedia, NBC) created the series The Undersea World of Jacques Cousteau, with the character of the commander in the red bonnet inherited from standard diving dress intended to give the films a "personalized adventure" style. This documentary television series ran for 10 years from 1966 to 1976. A second documentary series, The Cousteau Odyssey, ran from 1977 to 1982 on public television stations.

In 1970, he wrote the book The Shark: Splendid Savage of the Sea with his son Philippe. In this book, Cousteau described the oceanic whitetip shark as "the most dangerous of all sharks".

In December 1972, two years after the volcano's last eruption, The Cousteau Society was filming Voyage au bout du monde on Deception Island, Antarctica, when Michel Laval, Calypso's second in command, was struck and killed by a rotor of the helicopter that was ferrying between Calypso and the island.

In 1973, along with his two sons and Frederick Hyman, he created the Cousteau Society for the Protection of Ocean Life, Frederick Hyman being its first President.

In 1975, John Denver released the tribute song "Calypso" on his album Windsong, and on the B-side of his hit song "I'm Sorry". "Calypso" became a hit on its own and was later considered the new A-side, reaching No. 2 on the charts.

In 1976, Cousteau located the wreck of HMHS Britannic, which had sunk on 21 November 1916 after striking a mine in the Kea Channel, the third and final of the three Olympic-class liners and the younger sister to the RMS Olympic and RMS Titanic. He also found the wreck of the French 17th-century ship-of-the-line La Therese in coastal waters of Crete.

In 1977, together with Peter Scott, he received the UN International Pahlavi Environment prize.

On 28 June 1979, while the Calypso was on an expedition to Portugal, his second son Philippe, his preferred and designated successor and with whom he had co-produced all his films since 1969, died in a PBY Catalina flying boat crash in the Tagus River near Lisbon. Cousteau was deeply affected. He called his eldest son, the architect Jean-Michel, to his side to help run the Cousteau Society. This collaboration lasted 14 years before Jean-Michel left the organization to produce environmental films.

=== 1980–1990s ===
From 1980 to 1981, he was a regular on the animal reality show Those Amazing Animals, along with Burgess Meredith, Priscilla Presley, and Jim Stafford.

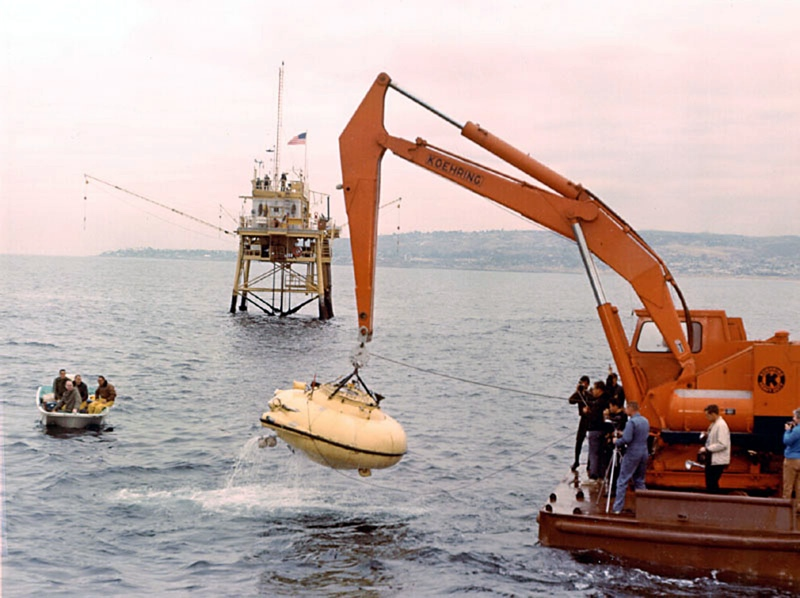
Cousteau's Diving Saucer

In 1980, Cousteau traveled to Canada to make two films on the Saint Lawrence River and the Great Lakes, Cries from the Deep and St. Lawrence: Stairway to the Sea.

From 1982 to 1984, Cousteau released a series of films on the Amazon with TBS.

In 1985, he received the Presidential Medal of Freedom from U.S. President Ronald Reagan. He also released Cousteau/Mississippi, which won a Primetime Emmy Award for Outstanding Informational Special.

From 1986 to 1992, Cousteau released Rediscovery of the World, also with TBS.

On 24 November 1988, he was elected to the Académie française, chair 17, succeeding Jean Delay. His official reception under the cupola took place on 22 June 1989, the response to his speech of reception being given by Bertrand Poirot-Delpech. After his death, he was replaced by Érik Orsenna on 28 May 1998.

In June 1990, the composer Jean Michel Jarre paid homage to the commander by entitling his new album Waiting for Cousteau. He also composed the music for Cousteau's documentary "Palawan, the last refuge".

On 2 December 1990, his wife, Simone Cousteau died of cancer. Six months later, in June 1991, in Paris, Jacques-Yves Cousteau remarried to Francine Triplet, with whom he had a relationship since the early 1980s and two children, Diane (born in 1980) and Pierre-Yves (born in 1982). Francine Cousteau currently continues her husband's work as the head of the Cousteau Foundation and Cousteau Society. From that point, the relations between Jacques-Yves and his elder son, who is 8 years older than Francine, worsened.

In November 1991, Cousteau gave an interview to the UNESCO Courier, in which he stated that he was in favour of human population control and population decrease. Widely quoted on the Internet are these two paragraphs from the interview: "What should we do to eliminate suffering and disease? It's a wonderful idea but perhaps not altogether a beneficial one in the long run. If we try to implement it we may jeopardize the future of our species...It's terrible to have to say this. World population must be stabilized and to do that we must eliminate 350,000 people per day. This is so horrible to contemplate that we shouldn't even say it. But the general situation in which we are involved is lamentable".

In 1992, he was invited to Rio de Janeiro, Brazil, for the United Nations' International Conference on Environment and Development, and then he became a regular consultant for the UN and the World Bank.

In 1993, a brief biography, as well as an introduction by Cousteau was featured in interactive educational software program Undersea Adventure, developed by former game developer Knowledge Adventure.

In 1995, Cousteau became involved in a legal battle with his son Jean-Michel, who was advertising the "Cousteau Fiji Islands Resort" in the South Pacific, to prevent him from using the Cousteau name for business purposes in the United States. This resulted in Jean-Michel Cousteau being ordered by the court to not encourage confusion between his for-profit business and his father's non-profit endeavours.

On 11 January 1996, Calypso was rammed and sunk in the port of Singapore by a barge. The Calypso was refloated and towed home to France.

=== Religious views ===
Archbishop Jean-Marie Lustiger celebrated his funeral Mass at Notre-Dame in Paris. In his homily he stated, "Without betraying any confidences, Father Carré told me of his respect for Jacques-Yves Cousteau. He discovered in him a man of prayer whom he accompanied in his last months of his life, giving him, through the sacraments of the Church, the strength of his passage towards eternity."

In a chapter entitled "The Holy Scriptures and the Environment" in the posthumous work The Human, the Orchid, and the Octopus, he is quoted as stating that "The glory of nature provides evidence that God exists".

=== Opinion on recreational fishing ===
Jacques Cousteau said that just because fish are cold-blooded does not mean they do not feel pain, and that recreational fishermen only say so to reassure their conscience.

== Death and legacy ==
Jacques-Yves Cousteau died of a heart attack on 25 June 1997 in Paris, two weeks after his 87th birthday. He was buried in the family vault at Saint-André-de-Cubzac, his birthplace. A homage was paid to him by the town by naming the street which runs out to the house of his birth "rue du Commandant Cousteau", where a commemorative plaque was placed.

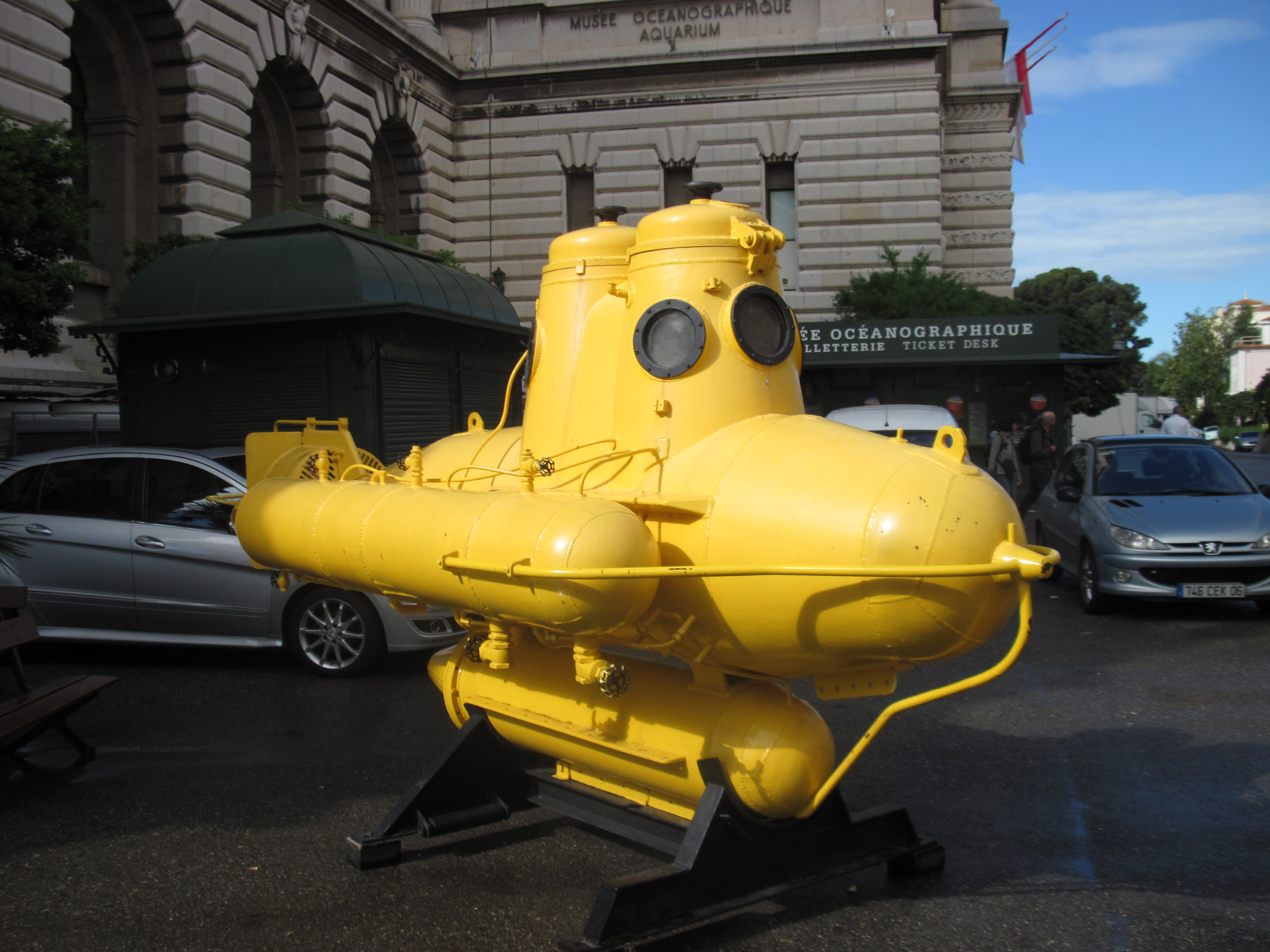
Cousteau's submarine near Oceanographic Museum in Monaco

Cousteau's legacy includes more than 120 television documentaries, more than 50 books, and an environmental protection foundation with 300,000 members.

Cousteau liked to call himself an "oceanographic technician". He was, in reality, a sophisticated showman, teacher, and lover of nature. His work permitted many people to explore the resources of the oceans.

His work also created a new kind of scientific communication, criticized at the time by some academics. The so-called "divulgationism", a simple way of sharing scientific concepts, was soon employed in other disciplines and became one of the most important characteristics of modern television broadcasting.

His Oceanographic Museum in Monaco, and perhaps even he himself, has been identified as introducing the "Killer Algae" Caulerpa taxifolia, which are negatively affecting the Mediterranean's ecosystem.

The Cousteau Society and its French counterpart, l'Équipe Cousteau, both of which Jacques-Yves Cousteau founded, are still active today. The Society is currently attempting to turn the original Calypso into a museum and it is raising funds to build a successor vessel, the Calypso II.

In 2007, the International Watch Company introduced the IWC Aquatimer Chronograph "Cousteau Divers" Special Edition. The timepiece incorporated a sliver of wood from the interior of Cousteau's Calypso research vessel. Having developed the diver's watch, IWC offered support to The Cousteau Society. The proceeds from the timepieces' sales were partially donated to the non-profit organization involved in conservation of marine life and preservation of tropical coral reefs.

Fabien Cousteau, the grandson of Jacques Cousteau, is in the process of constructing a community of ocean flooring analysis stations, called Proteus, off Curaçao at a depth of about 20 m in a marine-protected area. Aquanauts could reside and work in these underwater habitats. Front-end engineering has started in 2022 with the habitat planned for the sea bottom in 2025.

In October 1997, an underwater plaque honoring Jacques Cousteau was placed in the underwater dive park off Casino Point in Avalon, California. Because of deterioration, the plaque was replaced in November 2020.

== Awards and honors ==
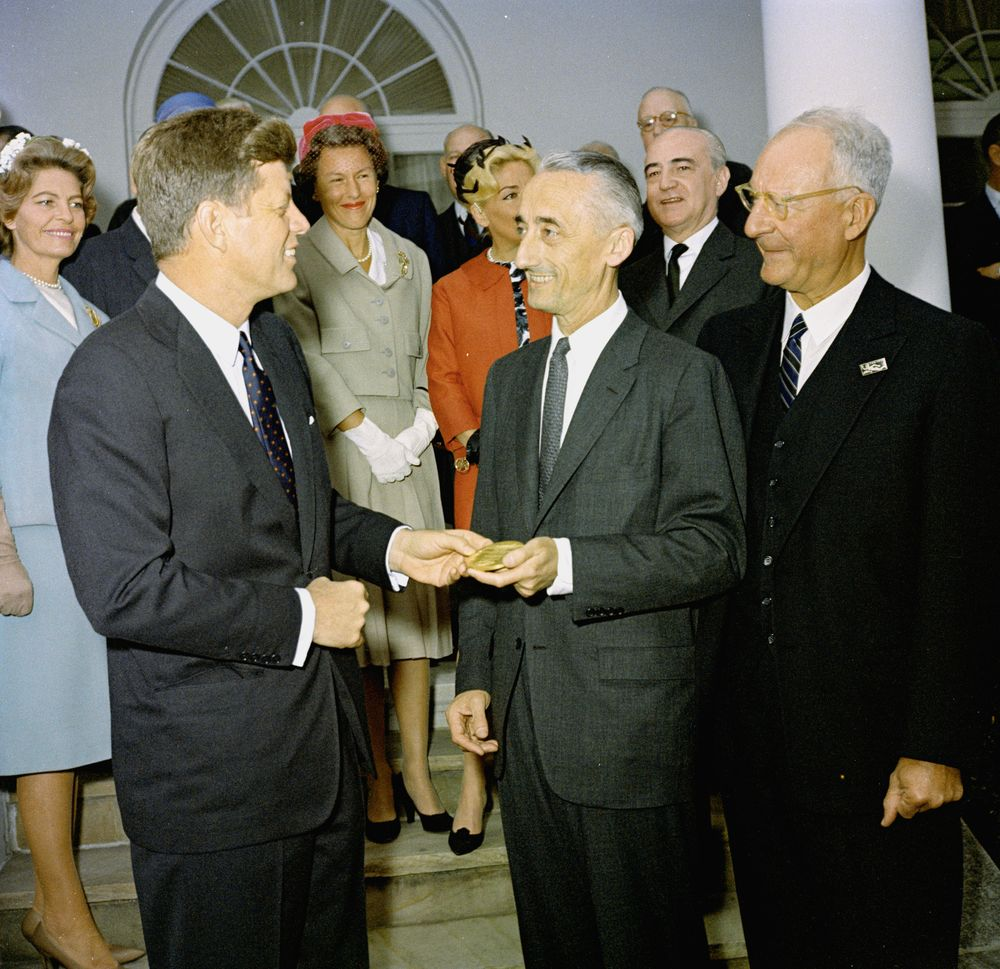
President Kennedy awards the National Geographic Society's Gold Medal to Jacques Cousteau, 1961

During his lifetime, Jacques-Yves Cousteau received these distinctions:

- Cross of War 1939–1945 (1945)
- National Geographic Society's Special Gold Medal in 1961
- Commander of the Legion of Honour (1972)
- BAFTA Fellowship (1975)
- Officer of the Order of Maritime Merit (1980)
- Grand Cross of the National Order of Merit (1985)
- U.S. Presidential Medal of Freedom (1985)
- Induction into the Television Hall of Fame (1987)
- Elected to the Académie Française (1988)
- Commander of the Order of Arts and Letters
- Honorary Companion of the Order of Australia (26 January 1990)

== Filmography ==
No (Note: actual order, it is incorrect on the official filmography)	Year (Fr/En) (Note: actual years, they are incorrect on the official filmography)	French	English (Note: actual names, they are incorrect on the official filmography)	Cousteau Film
1. Early Short Films
1S	1942	Par dix-huit mètres de fond		Yes
2S	1943	Épaves	Shipwrecks	Yes
3S	1944	Paysages du silence	Silent Lands...	Yes
4S	1948	Phoques au Sahara		—N/a
5S	1949	Autour d'un récif		—N/a
6S	1949	Une plongée du Rubis	A Dive on Board the Rubis	Yes
7S	1949	Carnet de plongée (avec Marcel Ichac)		—N/a
8S	1955	La Fontaine de Vaucluse (avec Louis Malle)		—N/a
9S	1955	Station 307		—N/a
10S	1955	Récifs de coraux		—N/a
11S	1957	La Galère engloutie (avec Jacques Ertaud)		—N/a
12S	1959	Histoire d'un poisson rouge	The Golden Fish	Yes
13S	1960	Vitrines sous la mer (avec Georges Alépée)		—N/a
14S	1960	Prince Albert I		—N/a
2. Movies I
1F	1956	Le Monde du silence	The Silent World	Yes
2F	1964	Le Monde sans soleil	World Without Sun	Yes
3. The Odyssey of the Cousteau Team I (also known as "The Undersea World of Jacques Cousteau")
1	1966	L'aventure Précontinent	Conshelf Adventure	Yes
2	1967/1968	Les Requins	Sharks	Yes
3	1967/1968	La jungle de corail	The Savage World of the Coral Jungle	Yes
4	1967/1968	Le Destin des tortues de mer	Search in the Deep	Yes
5	1968	Baleines et cachalots	Whales	Yes
6	1968/1969	Le voyage surprise de Pepito et Cristobal	The Unexpected Voyage of Pepito and Cristobal	Yes
7	1968/1969	Trésor englouti	Sunken Treasure	Yes
8	1968/1969	La légende du lac Titicaca	The Legend of Lake Titicaca	Yes
9	1969	Les baleines du désert	The Desert Whales	Yes
10	1969/1970	La nuit des calmars	The Night of the Squid	Yes
11	1969/1970	La retour des Éléphants de mer	The Return of the Sea Elephants	Yes
12	1970	Ces incroyables machines plongeantes	Those Incredible Diving Machines	Yes
13	1970	La mer vivante	The Water Planet	Yes
14	1970	La tragédie des Saumons rouges	The Tragedy of the Red Salmon	Yes
15	1970/1971	Le lagon des navires perdus	Lagoon of Lost Ships	Yes
16	1971	Les Dragons des Galápagos	The Dragons of the Galapagos	Yes
17	1971	Cavernes englouties	Secrets of the Sunken Caves	Yes
18	1971	Le sort des Loutres de mer	The Unsinkable Sea Otter	Yes
19	1971/1972	Les dernières Sirènes	The Forgotten Mermaids	Yes
20	1972/1971	Pieuvre, petite pieuvre	Octopus, Octopus	Yes
21	1972	Le chant des dauphins	A Sound of Dolphins	Yes
22	1973	500 millions d'années sous la mer	500 Million Years Beneath the Sea	Yes
23	1973/1972	Le sourire du Morse	A Smile of the Walrus	Yes
24	1973	Hippo, Hippo	Hippo!	Yes
25	1973	La baleine qui chante	The Singing Whale	Yes
26	1974/1973	Mission Cousteau en Antarctique. Partie I. La glace et le feu	Cousteau in the Antarctic. Part I. South to Fire and Ice	Yes
27	1974	Mission Cousteau en Antarctique. Partie II. Le vol du Pingouin	Cousteau in the Antarctic. Part II. The Flight of Penguins	Yes
28	1974	Mission Cousteau en Antarctique. Partie III. La vie sous un océan de glace	Cousteau in the Antarctic. Part III. Beneath the Frozen World	Yes
29	1974	Mission Cousteau en Antarctique. Partie IV. Blizzard à Esperanza	Cousteau in the Antarctic. Part IV. Blizzard at Hope Bay	Yes
30	1975/1974	Patagonie: La vie au bout du monde	Life at the End of the World	Yes
31	1975	L'hiver des Castors	Beavers of the North Country	Yes
32	1975	Les Fous du Corail	The Coral Divers of Corsica	Yes
33	1975	Les requins dormeurs du Yucatán	The Sleeping Sharks of Yucatán	Yes
34	1976/1975	Coup d'aile sous la mer: Isabella	The Sea Birds of Isabella	Yes
35	1976	Au cœur des récifs des Caraïbes	Mysteries of the Hidden Reefs	Yes
36	1976	Le Poisson qui a gobé Jonas / El Gran Pez que se tragó a Jonás	The Fish That Swallowed Jonah	Yes
37	1976	La Marche des langoustes	The Incredible March of the Spiny Lobsters	Yes
4. Movies II
3F	1975 / 1976	Voyage au bout du monde	Voyage to the Edge of the World	Yes
5. Oasis in Space
1S	1977		What Price Progress?	No
2S	1977		Troubled Waters	No
3S	1977		Grain of Conscience	No
4S	1977		Population Time Bomb	No
5S	1977		The Power Game	No
6S	1977		Visions of Tomorrow	No
6. The Cousteau Odyssey II (also known as "The Jacques Cousteau Odyssey", continue "The Odyssey of the Cousteau Team")
38	1977	L'énigme du Britannic	Calypso's Search for the Britannic	Yes
39	1978	Le butin de Pergame sauvé des eaux	Diving for Roman Plunder	Yes
40	1978	À la recherche de l'Atlantide. Partie I	Calypso's Search for Atlantis. Part I	Yes
41	1978	À la recherche de l'Atlantide. Partie II	Calypso's Search for Atlantis. Part II	Yes
42	1978	Le testament de l'île de Pâques	Blind Prophets of Easter Island	Yes
43	1978	Ultimatum sous la mer	Time Bomb at Fifty Fathoms	Yes
44	1979	Le sang de la mer	Mediterranean: Cradle or Coffin?	Yes
45	1979	Le Nil. Partie I	The Nile. Part I	Yes
46	1979	Le Nil. Partie II	The Nile. Part II	Yes
47	1980	Fortunes de mer	Lost Relics of the Sea	Yes
48	1980/1981	Clipperton: île de la solitude	Clipperton: The Island Time Forgot	Yes
49	1981/1982	Sang chaud dans la mer	Warm-Blooded Sea: Mammals of the Deep	Yes
7. North American Adventures
1F	1981	Les Pièges de la mer	Cries from the Deep	No
2F	1982	Du grand large aux grands lac	Saint Lawrence: Stairway to the Sea	Yes
8. Cousteau's Amazon Series
1S	1982	Objectif Amazone: Branle-bas sur la Calypso	Calypso Countdown: Rigging for the Amazon	Yes
2	1983	Au pays des milles rivières	Journey to a Thousand Rivers	Yes
3	1983	La rivière enchantée	The Enchanted River	Yes
4	1983	Ombres fuyantes—Indiens de l'Amazonie	Shadows in the Wilderness—Indians of the Amazon	Yes
5	1983/1984	La rivière de l'or	River of Gold	Yes
6	1984	Message d'un monde perdu	Legacy of a Lost World	Yes
7	1984	Un avenir pour l'Amazonie	Blueprints for Amazonia	Yes
8	1984	Tempête de neige sur la jungle	Snowstorm in the Jungle	Yes
9. Other releases I
1	1985	Le Mississippi. Partie I. Un Allié récalcitrant	Cousteau at Mississippi. The Reluctant Ally	Yes
2	1985	Le Mississippi. Partie II. Allié et adversaire	Cousteau at Mississippi. The Friendly Foe	Yes
3	1985	Jacques-Yves Cousteau: mes premier 75 ans (1)	Jacques Cousteau: The First 75 Years (1)	No
4	1985	Jacques-Yves Cousteau: mes premier 75 ans (2)	Jacques Cousteau: The First 75 Years (2)	No
5	1985	Alcyone, fille du vent	Riders of the Wind	Yes
6S	1988		Island of Peace	Yes
10. Cousteau's Rediscovery of the World I (also known as "Rediscover the World")
1	1986	Haïti: L'eau de chagrin	Haiti: Waters of Sorrow	Yes
2	1986	Cuba: les eaux du destin	Cuba: Waters of Destiny	Yes
3	1986	Cap Horn: les eaux du vent	Cape Horn: Waters of the Wind	Yes
4	1986	L'héritage de Cortez	Sea of Cortez: Legacy of Cortez	Yes
5	1987	Les Îles Marquises: montagnes de la mer	The Marquesas Islands: Mountains from the Sea	Yes
6	1987	Îles du Détroit: les eaux de la discorde	Channel Islands: Waters of Contention	Yes
7	1987	Îles du Détroit: à l'approche d'une marée humaine	Channel Islands: Days of Future Past	Yes
8	1988	Nouvelle-Zélande: la Rose et le dragon	New Zealand: The Rose and the Dragon	Yes
9	1988	Nouvelle-Zélande: au pays du long nuage blanc	New Zealand: The Heron of the Single Flight	Yes
10	1988	Nouvelle-Zélande: le Péché et la Rédemption	New Zealand: The Smoldering Sea	Yes
11	1988	Au pays des totems vivants	Pacific Northwest: Land of the Living Totems	Yes
12	1988	Tahiti: l'eau de feu	Tahiti: Fire Waters	Yes
13	1988	Les Requins de l'île au trésor	Cocos Island: Sharks of Treasure Island	Yes
14	1988/1989	Mer de Béring: Le crépuscule du chasseur en Alaska	Bering Sea: Twilight of the Alaskan Hunter	Yes
15	1988/1989	Australie: l'ultime barrière	Australia: The Last Barrier	Yes
16	1989	Bornéo: Le spectre de la tortue	Borneo: The Ghost of the Sea Turtle	Yes
17	1989	Papouasie Nouvelle-Guinée I: La machine à remonter le temps	Papua New Guinea I: Into the Time Machine	Yes
18	1989	Papouasie Nouvelle-Guinée II: La rivière des hommes crocodiles	Papua New Guinea II: River of Crocodile Men	Yes
19	1989	Papouasie Nouvelle-Guinée III: La coeur de feu	Papua New Guinea III: Center of Fire	Yes
20	1989	Thaïlande: les forçats de la mer	Thailand: Convicts of the Sea	Yes
21	1989/1990	Bornéo: la Forêt sans terre	Borneo: Forests Without Land	Yes
11. Other releases II
7	1990	Scandale à Valdez	Outrage at Valdez	No
8	1990	Lilliput en Antarctique	Lilliput in Antarctica	Yes
12. Cousteau's Rediscovery of the World II (also known as "Rediscover the World")
22	1990	Andaman, les îles invisibles	Andaman Islands: Invisible Islands	Yes
23	1990/1991	Australie: à l'ouest du bout du monde	Australia: Out West, Down Under	Yes
24	1991	Australie: le peuple de la mer desséchée	Australia: People of the Dry Sea	Yes
25	1991	Australie: le peuple de l'eau et du feu	Australia: People of Fire and Water	Yes
26	1991	Australie: les trésors de la mer	Australia: Fortunes in the Sea	Yes
27	1991	Tasmanie, une île s'éveille	Tasmania: Australia's Awakening Island	Yes
28	1991	Indonésie: les vergers de l'enfer	Indonesia I: The Devil's Orchard	Yes
29	1991	Sumatra: le cœur de la mer	Indonesia II: Sumatra, the Heart of the Sea	Yes
30	1991/1992	Nauru, îlot ou planète	Nauru: The Island Planet	Yes
31	1991/1992	La grand requin blanc, seigneur solitaire des mers	The Great White Shark—Lonely Lord of the Sea	No
32	1991	Palawan, le dernier refuge	Palawan: The Last Refuge	Yes
33	1992	Danube I: le lever de rideau	Danube I: The Curtain Rises	Yes
34	1992	Danube II: le rêve de Charlemagne	Danube II: Charlemagne's Dream	Yes
35	1992	Danube III: les Cris du Fleuve	Danube III: The River Cries Out	Yes
36	1992	Danube IV: les Débordements du Fleuve	Danube IV: Rivalries Overflow	Yes
37	1993	La société secrète des Cétacés	Bahamas: The Secret Societies of Dolphins and Whales	No
38	1993	Mékong: le don de l'eau	Mekong: The Gift of Water	No
39	1993	Vietnam et Cambodge: le riz et les fusils	Vietnam and Cambodia: Children of Rice and Guns	No
13. Other releases III
9	1995	La Légende de Calypso	Calypso's Legend	Yes
10	1995	Profond, loin, longtemps	Deeper, Farther, Longer	Yes
11	1996	Les promisses de la mer	The Mirage of the Sea	Yes
14. Cousteau's Rediscovery of the World III (also known as "Rediscover the World")
40	1995	Madagascar I: l'île des esprits	Madagascar I: Island of Heart and Soul	Yes
41	1995	Madagascar II: l'île des esprits	Madagascar II: Island of Heart and Soul	Yes
42	1996	Afrique du Sud: les diamants du désert	South Africa: Diamonds of the Desert	Yes
43	1996	Afrique du Sud: sanctuaires pour la vie	South Africa: Sanctuaries for Life	Yes
44	1996/1997	À travers la Chine par le fleuve Jaune	China: Across China with the Yellow River	Yes
45	1997/1999	Le lac Baïkal	Lake Baikal: Beneath the Mirror	Yes

=== Legend ===
- S – short film
- F – full-length film
- <only number> – length of the film is about 45 minutes

== Bibliography ==
- The Silent World (1953, with Frédéric Dumas)
- Captain Cousteaus Underwater Treasury (1959, with James Dugan)
- The Living Sea (1963, with James Dugan)
- World Without Sun (1965)
- The Undersea Discoveries of Jacques-Yves Cousteau (1970–1975, 8-volumes, with Philippe Diolé)
  - The Shark: Splendid Savage of the Sea (1970)
  - Diving for Sunken Treasure (1971)
  - Life and Death in a Coral Sea (1971)
  - The Whale: Mighty Monarch of the Sea (1972)
  - Octopus and Squid: The Soft Intelligence (1973)
  - Three Adventures: Galápagos, Titicaca, the Blue Holes (1973)
  - Diving Companions: Sea Lion, Elephant Seal, Walrus (1974)
  - Dolphins (1975)
- The Ocean World of Jacques Cousteau (1973–78, 21 volumes)
  - Oasis in Space (vol 1)
  - The Act of Life (vol 2)
  - Quest for Food (vol 3)
  - Window in the Sea (vol 4)
  - The Art of Motion (vol 5)
  - Attack and Defense (vol 6)
  - Invisible Messages (vol 7)
  - Instinct and Intelligence (vol 8)
  - Pharaohs of the Sea (vol 9)
  - Mammals in the Sea (vol 10)
  - Provinces of the Sea (vol 11)
  - Man Re-Enters Sea (vol 12)
  - A Sea of Legends (vol 13)
  - Adventure of Life (vol 14)
  - Outer and Inner Space (vol 15)
  - The Whitecaps (vol 16)
  - Riches of the Sea (vol 17)
  - Challenges of the Sea (vol 18)
  - The Sea in Danger (vol 19)
  - Guide to the Sea and Index (vol 20)
  - Calypso (1978, vol 21)
- A Bill of Rights for Future Generations (1979)
- Life at the Bottom of the World (1980)
- The Cousteau United States Almanac of the Environment (1981, a.k.a. The Cousteau Almanac of the Environment: An Inventory of Life on a Water Planet)
- Jacques Cousteau's Calypso (1983, with Alexis Sivirine)
- Marine Life of the Caribbean (1984, with James Cribb and Thomas H. Suchanek)
- Jacques Cousteau's Amazon Journey (1984, with Mose Richards)
- Jacques Cousteau: The Ocean World (1985)
- The Whale (1987, with Philippe Diolé)
- Jacques Cousteau: Whales (1988, with Yves Paccalet)
- The Human, The Orchid and The Octopus (and Susan Schiefelbein, coauthor; Bloomsbury 2007)

== Media portrayals ==
Jacques Cousteau has been portrayed in films:

- The American comedy film The Life Aquatic with Steve Zissou, directed by Wes Anderson and first released in December 2004, portrays Steve Zissou, a fictional oceanographer strongly inspired by Jacques Cousteau.
- The French film The Odyssey, directed by Jérôme Salle and first released in October 2016, focuses on Cousteau's life, especially regarding his relation with his first wife, Simone Melchior, and his second son, Philippe Cousteau.
- Jacques Cousteau was featured in Epic Rap Battle of History's sixth season, and was portrayed by Peter Shukoff. He faced off against Steve Irwin, portrayed by Lloyd Ahlquist.
- Jacques Cousteau is depicted in the music video for the Plastic Bertrand song titled "Jacques Cousteau." In the video Jacques Cousteau is depicted as wearing nautical attire and living in a fish bowl.
- Jacques Cousteau was briefly featured in the animated television series, SpongeBob SquarePants, in the episode SpongeBob's Big Birthday Blowout. He was portrayed as the French Narrator who frequently speaks and/or makes appearances in the show.
- Jacques Cousteau is mentioned in The Tragically Hip – Canadian rock band song, Twist My Arm.
- In the 2006, Michael Bay film Bad Boys II, Jacques Cousteau was mentioned by Will Smith's character in a heated argument. The quote was, "Ok look, we're a partnership, but we're a partnership with boundaries. We got a new rule. From now on you can't say the word flaccid to me. This is our little boundary box. We're gonna take the word flaccid and put it in there with my mom's titties and your erection problem and we gonna close this box and we gonna throw this bitch in the ocean. And the only way that you can get to this box is you gotta be mother****in' Jacques Cousteau."
- In Mas Bouzidi's movie Concessions,Cousteau was mentioned by the eccentric character Russell Wilkie, comparing him to his imaginary Canadian girlfriend.

== See also ==
- Becoming Cousteau, a 2021 full-length film biography
- Alcyone – Experimental turbosail ship
- William Beebe – American ornithologist, marine biologist, entomologist, and explorer (1877–1962)
- Albert Falco – French scuba diver, chief diver and captain of the Calypso
- Scuba diving – Swimming underwater, breathing gas carried by the diver
- List of Legion of Honour recipients by name (C)
