= Francine Cousteau =

French non-profit executive (born 1946)

Francine Cousteau (née Triplet; born 1946) is the president of the non-profit organization Cousteau Society, and is the widow of oceanographer Jacques-Yves Cousteau. She is the mother of Jacques Cousteau's third and fourth children, Diane and Pierre-Yves.

After Jacques Cousteau's death, Francine became involved in legal battles with family members regarding her husband's financial and spiritual legacies, as well as the salvage and use of RV Calypso whose fixing and refurbishing has never materialized since its sinking and recovery in bad condition in 1996.
