= SP-350 Denise =

French two-person submarine built in 1959

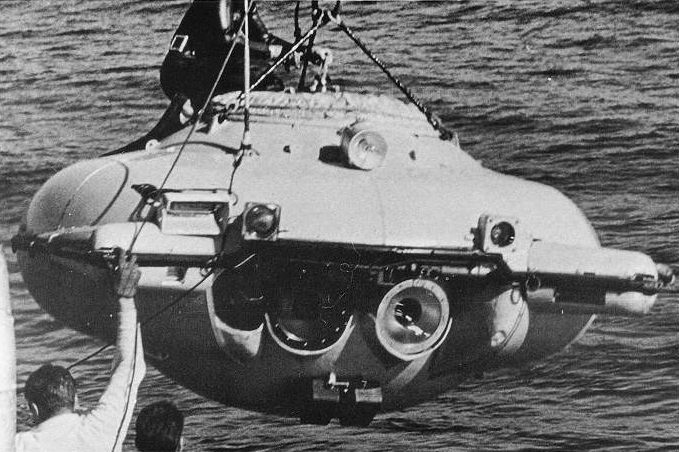

History

France
- Owner: Cousteau Society
- Port of registry: France
- Launched: 1959
- Maiden voyage: 1959
- Home port: Marseille, France
- Identification: SP-350
- Nickname(s): Denise
- Status: Decommissioned

General characteristics
- Type: Submarine
- Displacement: 3.8 tonnes
- Length: 2.75 m (9 ft 0 in)
- Beam: 2.75 m (9 ft 0 in)
- Draught: 1.5 m (4 ft 11 in)
- Propulsion: Electric water jet
- Speed: 1 knot
- Endurance: 96 hours (one person)
- Test depth: 1,000 m (3,300 ft)
- Complement: 2
- Crew: 2

The SP-350 Denise, famous as the "Diving saucer" (Soucoupe plongeante), is a small submarine designed to hold two people, and is capable of exploring depths of up to 400 metres (1,300 ft). It was invented by Jacques-Yves Cousteau and engineer Jean Mollard at the French Centre for Undersea Research. It was built in 1959 and usually operated from Cousteau's ship, the Calypso.

== Specifications ==
Denise's propulsion consists of steerable, electrically powered water jets, allowing it to navigate in all directions, as well as turn about its vertical axis. To correct the attitude of the hull, the pilot can shift a liquid mercury ballast mass. The crew members enter the craft through a hatch on the top of the hull and lie prone side-by-side on mattresses to operate it, watching their surroundings through tilted portholes that let them come within a few centimeters of their subject. Electric lamps are fitted for night diving and to provide illumination for photography at extreme working depths. An electrically operated manipulator arm can be fitted at the front of the craft so that the craft can pick up objects for the crew to examine through the portholes.

The steel pressure hull, nearly circular in plan form, is 2 metres (6 ft 7 in) in diameter and 1.43 metres (4 ft 8 in) high, able to resist a pressure of more than 90 kg/cm^{2} (1,300 psi), equivalent to a depth of nearly 900 metres (3,000 ft), although dives never exceed 300 metres (980 ft) for safety.

Denise is naturally positively buoyant, and is weighted to negative buoyancy with ballast weights that can be jettisoned in an emergency. If the craft is within 100 metres (330 ft) of the surface, the crew can abandon it via the top hatch, provided they are equipped with emergency breathing apparatus.

Launching and recovery is accomplished with the assistance of a shipboard crane.

== Use ==
The vehicle was featured in Cousteau's film Le Monde sans soleil ("World Without Sun")

Denise was used by Jacques Cousteau in 1976 to explore the wreck of HMHS Britannic.

== SP-500 Sea Fleas ==
Two smaller one person diving saucers were built by Cousteau. They were called SP-500 Sea Fleas and often worked in pairs. They were launched in 1967 and could dive to 500 metres (1,600 ft).

== See also ==
- Deep Star 4000, another submersible designed by Cousteau
