= World Without Sun =

1964 documentary film by Jacques Cousteau

- Film poster
- Directed by: Jacques-Yves Cousteau
- Written by: Jacques-Yves Cousteau; James Dugan
- Distributed by: Columbia Pictures (United States)
- Release dates: September 30, 1964 (France); December 22, 1964 (USA)
- Running time: 93 minutes
- Countries: France; Italy
- Language: French

World Without Sun (French: Le Monde sans soleil) is a 1964 French documentary film directed by Jacques-Yves Cousteau. The film was Cousteau's second to win the Academy Award for Best Documentary Feature, following The Silent World in 1956.

== Content ==
The film chronicles Continental Shelf Station Two, or "Conshelf Two", the first ambitious attempt to create an environment in which men could live and work on the seafloor. In it, a half-dozen oceanauts lived 10 meters down in the Red Sea off Sudan in a star-fish shaped house for 30 days. The undersea living experiment also had two other structures, one a submarine hangar that housed a small, two-man submarine referred to as the "diving saucer" for its resemblance to a science fiction flying saucer, and a smaller "deep cabin" where two oceanauts lived at a depth of 30 meters for a week. The undersea colony was supported by air, water, food, power, all essentials of life, from a large support team above. Men on the bottom performed a number of experiments intended to determine the practicality of working on the sea floor and were subjected to continual medical examinations.

Funded in part by the French petrochemical industry, the Conshelf Two experiment was originally intended to demonstrate the practicality of exploitation of the sea using underwater habitats as base stations. In the end, Cousteau repudiated such an approach, turning his efforts instead toward conservation. The lyrical and dramatic underwater sequences also likely contributed to the beginning of an era of ocean conservation as well as incidentally promoting sport diving. Memorable sequences involve men cavorting with fishes, an underwater chess game and the diving saucer reaching depths of 300 meters, encountering new and unique forms of life.

== Reception ==
The documentary received wide international theatrical distribution, and won Best Documentary at the 37th Academy Awards, Cousteau's second Oscar following The Silent World in 1956, as well as numerous other honors.

Reviews were overwhelmingly positive, although some criticism arose around accusations of "faking" footage, most notably by New York Times reviewer Bosley Crowther, who questioned the authenticity of two of the more dramatic scenes. He stated in his 1964 review, "Oceanographers consulted here yesterday said it was highly unlikely that a deep-sea cavern, containing a "bubble," or pocket of air, at its top, could exist. If it did, the atmosphere in that bubble would surely be noxious, they said. It would be methane or marsh gas. And the pressure in it would be intolerable for man."

The confusion stemmed from Crowther's assertion that the footage was filmed at great depth, an issue not clearly addressed in the film proper. His other complaint was a long tracking shot moving out from the window of one of the underwater structures, which Crowther claimed could only have been produced in an aquarium. Cousteau, taking great offense, went on to demonstrate how he and his son Philippe produced the shot with a combination of ropes and small underwater motorized vehicles.

== Preservation ==
The Academy Film Archive preserved World Without Sun in 2010.

== See also ==
- The Silent World – 1956 French documentary film co-directed by Jacques Cousteau and Louis Malle
- Voyage to the Edge of the World – 1976 French nature documentary
