= Émile Gagnan =

French engineer and co-inventor of the open circuit demand scuba regulator

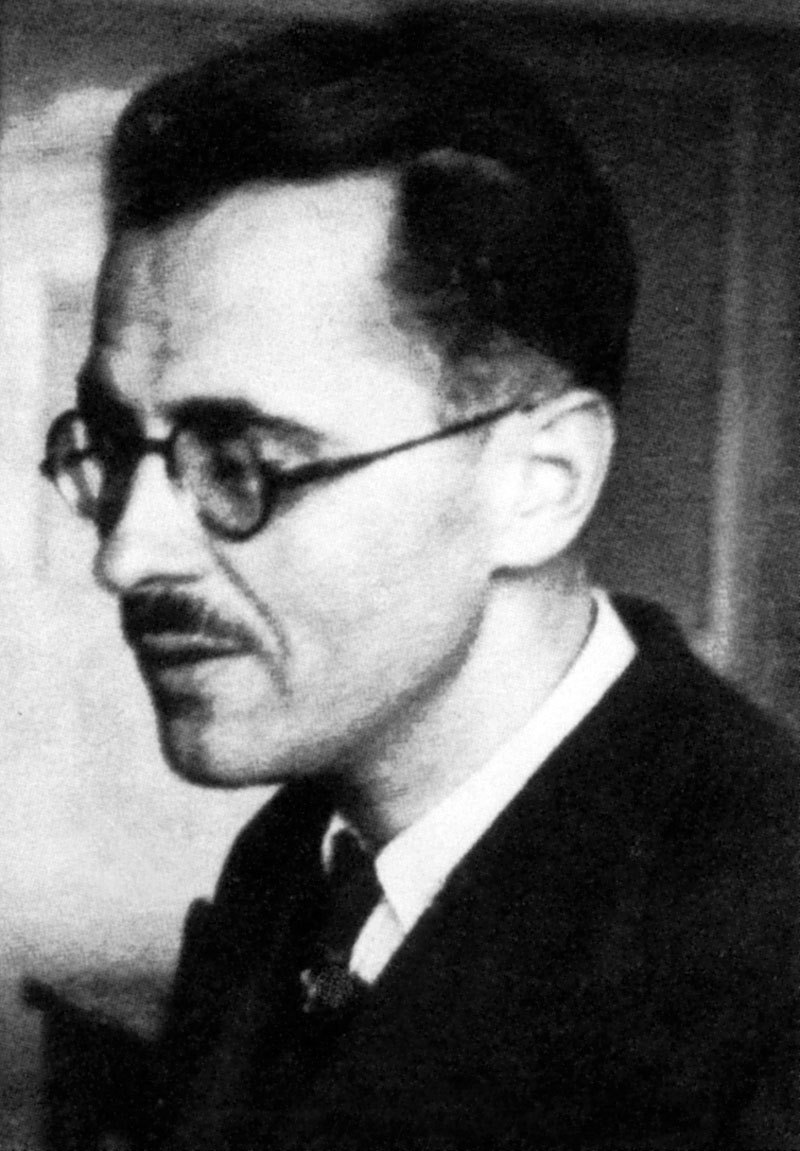
Émile Gagnan

Émile Gagnan (1900 – 1984) was a French engineer and, in 1943, co-inventor with French Navy diver Jacques-Yves Cousteau of the Aqua-Lung, the diving regulator (a.k.a. demand-valve) used for the first Scuba equipment. The demand-valve, or regulator, was designed for regulating gas in gas-generator engines, but was found to be excellent for regulating air-supply under varied pressure conditions. This allowed people to explore the ocean more easily, even though the original purpose was different.

Gagnan was born in the French province of Burgundy in November 1900, and graduated from technology school in the early 1920s. He was employed as an engineer specializing in high-pressure pneumatic design by the large gas-supply firm Air Liquide. The first production 'Scaphandre Autonome' - or 'Aqualung' was released in France in 1946 under the identification code "CG45" ("C" for Cousteau, "G" for Gagnan and "45" for 1945, year of the patent).

A year later, in 1947, Émile Gagnan and his family emigrated to Montreal, Quebec, Canada and he transferred to the employ of Canadian Liquid Air Ltd. There he set up a lab and proceeded to engineer, design, prototype and patent a very large number of SCUBA and undersea technology firsts, including the direct ancestors of virtually every type of Scuba regulator in common use today.
