= Aqua-Lung =

Original name for open-circuit scuba equipment

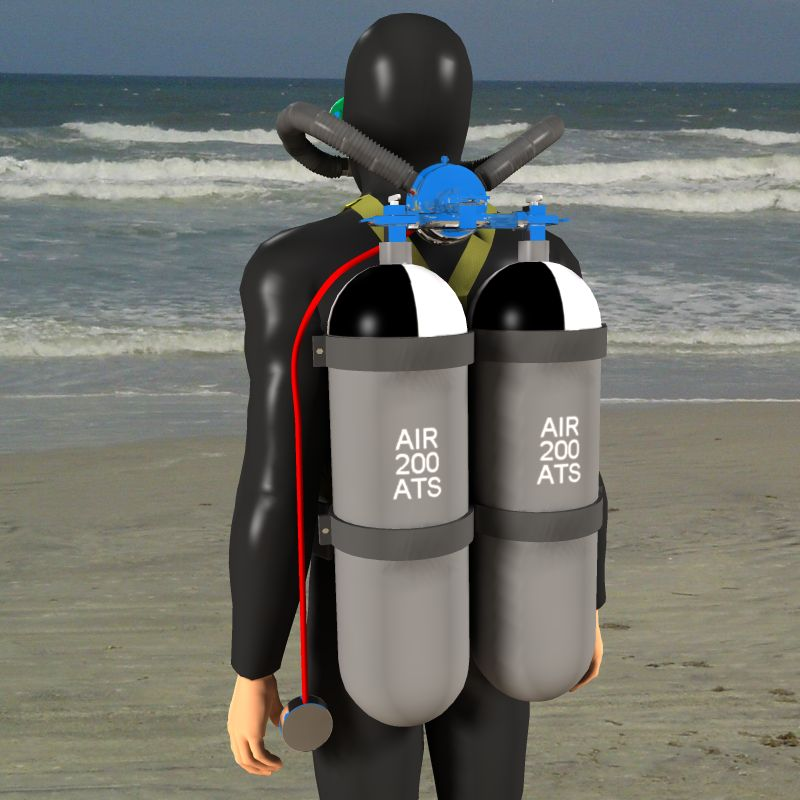
Classic twin-hose Cousteau-type aqualung

Aqua-Lung was the first open-circuit, self-contained underwater breathing apparatus (or "scuba") to achieve worldwide popularity and commercial success. This class of equipment is now commonly referred to as a twin-hose diving regulator, or demand valve. The Aqua-Lung was invented in France during the winter of 1942–1943 by two Frenchmen: engineer Émile Gagnan and Jacques Cousteau, who was a Naval Lieutenant (French: lieutenant de vaisseau). It allowed Cousteau and Gagnan to film and explore underwater more easily.

The invention revolutionized autonomous underwater diving by providing a compact, reliable system capable of a greater depth range and endurance than its precursors, and was a major factor influencing the development of recreational scuba diving after WWII.

The twin-hose Aqua-Lung demand regulator is the foundation of all scuba regulators. A diaphragm is used to control a valve to deliver the breathing gas to the diver on demand, at ambient water pressure. However, the layout has changed to a single hose system, where the second stage is split from the first stage along with the exhaust valve, as they must be kept at the same depth, and repositioned at the diver's mouth, eliminating the need for the exhaust hose, and allowing the use of a more rugged, smaller bore hose for the intermediate pressure gas supply to the second stage valve at the mouthpiece, but increasing the load on the diver's jaw and releasing bubbles nearer the eyes and ears.

== Mechanism ==
The Aqua-Lung is a self-contained open-circuit demand system, which means that breathing gas is provided from high-pressure storage carried by to the diver on demand, when the diver inhales and reduces the pressure in the supply hose, subsequently the flow is shut off when not required. Once breathed, the exhaled gas is vented to the surroundings. Scuba systems invented before the Aqua-Lung were mostly closed circuit rebreather equipment, in which breathing gas flows through an ambient pressure hose to the diver, and exhaled gas is returned through a scrubber which removes carbon dioxide, to a counter-lung reservoir. Some fresh gas is added to maintain the oxygen content and is then circulated back to the diver again in a closed loop. In open circuit free-flow systems, the air is supplied at an approximately constant rate, and the diver uses only a relatively small part of the passing gas.

The original Aqua-Lung regulator was a single stage unit, packaged in a circular brass housing mounted on the cylinder valve behind the diver's neck. High pressure gas flows into the regulator from the cylinder valve outlet, and is blocked by the demand valve. When the diver consumes ambient pressure gas, the pressure falls in the low pressure chamber and the diaphragm deforms inwards pushing against the valve lifter. This opens the high pressure valve permitting gas to flow past the valve seat into the low pressure chamber. When the diver stops inhaling, pressure in the low pressure chambers quickly rises until the diaphragm returns to its neutral position and no longer presses on the valve lifter, shutting off the flow until the next breath is taken. On a single stage regulator, the flow rate through the demand valve orifice will vary depending on cylinder pressure for the same opening size, and the opening force required will vary depending on the inlet pressure and orifice area, together making the delivery rate vary as the pressure in the cylinder changes. Flow rate is also affected by downstream pressure, which varies with depth, so the effort of breathing could vary considerably during a dive, even without taking diver attitude into account.

Later models included a first stage regulator to provide air to the demand valve at a lower pressure, compensated for depth, which allowed finer control and greater sensitivity to small pressure differences over the second stage diaphragm, but less sensitivity to cylinder pressure variation during the dive, both desirable features. Both the first and second stage valve mechanisms of the regulator are packaged in the circular brass housing mounted on the cylinder valve behind the diver's neck. High pressure gas flows into the regulator from the cylinder valve outlet, and is blocked by the first stage valve. The first stage reduces cylinder pressure to an interstage pressure, a fairly constant few bars higher than the ambient pressure, set by an adjustable spring preloading the diaphragm, The interstage breathing gas is then reduced to ambient pressure by the second stage.

The first stage diaphragm is a spring-loaded flexible cover to the interstage pressure chamber. When the diver consumes gas from the second stage, the pressure falls in the interstage chamber and the diaphragm deforms inwards pushing against the valve lifter. This opens the high pressure valve permitting gas to flow past the valve seat into the interstage chamber. When the diver stops inhaling, pressure in the low pressure chambers quickly rises until the diaphragm returns to its neutral position and no longer presses on the valve lifter, shutting off the flow until the next breath is taken.

The second, or demand valve stage, keeps the gas in the interstage chamber until it is opened by a reduction in pressure in the low-pressure chamber. It reduces the pressure of the interstage air supply to very nearly ambient pressure when the diver inhales the air in the low pressure chamber and the larger, more sensitive, low pressure diaphragm deflects inwards to push against the lever operating the second stage valve. When the diver stops inhaling, the flow continues only until the pressure in the low pressure chamber balances the ambient water pressure on the outside of the low pressure diaphragm.

To prevent free-flow or excessive exhaust back-pressure, the exhaust valve must be at the same depth as the diaphragm, and the only reliable place to do this is in the same housing. The air flows through a pair of large bore corrugated rubber hoses to and from the mouthpiece. The supply hose is connected to one side of the regulator body and supplies air to the mouthpiece through a non-return valve, and the exhaled air is returned to the regulator housing on the outside of the diaphragm, also through a non-return valve on the other side of the mouthpiece and through another non-return exhaust valve in the regulator housing. The non-return valves fitted to each of the breathing hoses where they connect to the mouthpiece prevent any water that gets into the mouthpiece from going into the inhalation hose, and ensures that once it is blown into the exhalation hose that it cannot flow back. This slightly increases the flow resistance of air and the work of breathing, but makes the regulator easier to clear, particularly when the diver does not have enough air in their lungs to blast clear with a sharp exhalation. By rolling in the right direction in a horizontal position, the trapped water will flow by gravity into the exhaust hose, and when the mouthpiece is shallower than the diaphragm, the regulator will tend to free-flow when out of the mouth, which can also be used to purge the inhalation hose.

Ideally the delivered pressure is equal to the resting pressure in the diver's lungs as this is what human lungs are adapted to breathe. With a twin hose regulator behind the diver at shoulder level, the delivered pressure changes with diver orientation. if the diver rolls on his or her back the released air pressure is higher than in the lungs. Divers learned to restrict flow by using their tongue to close the mouthpiece. When the cylinder pressure was running low and air demand effort rising, a roll to the right side made breathing easier. Raising the mouthpiece above the regulator increases the delivered pressure of gas at the mouth and increases exhaust resistance, and lowering the mouthpiece reduces delivered pressure and increases inhalation resistance.

== Invention and patent ==
An earlier underwater breathing regulator, known as the régulateur, was invented in France in 1860 by Benoît Rouquayrol. He first conceived it as a device to help assist in escaping from flooded mines. The Rouquayrol regulator was adapted to diving in 1864, when Rouquayrol met the lieutenant de vaisseau Auguste Denayrouze. The Rouquayrol-Denayrouze apparatus went into mass production and commercialization on 28 August 1865, when the French Navy Minister ordered the first units.

After 1884, several companies and entrepreneurs bought or inherited the patent and produced it until 1965. In 1942, during the German occupation of France, the patent was held by the Bernard Piel Company (Établissements Bernard Piel). One of their apparatuses went to Émile Gagnan, an engineer employed by the Air Liquide company. Gagnan miniaturized and adapted it to gas generators in response to a fuel shortage, which was a consequence of German requisitioning. Gagnan's boss, Henri Melchior, knew that his son-in-law Jacques-Yves Cousteau was looking for an automatic demand regulator to increase the useful endurance of the underwater breathing apparatus invented by Commander Yves le Prieur, so he introduced Cousteau to Gagnan in December 1942. On Cousteau's initiative, the Gagnan regulator was modified for use in diving. Cousteau and Gagnan were issued a patent some weeks later in 1943. After the war, in 1946, both men founded La Spirotechnique as a division of Air Liquide in order to mass-produce and sell their invention, this time under a new 1945 patent, and known as CG45 ("C" for Cousteau, "G" for Gagnan and "45" for 1945). This same CG45 regulator, produced for more than ten years and commercialized in France as of 1946, was the first to actually be called the "Aqua-Lung". In France, the terms scaphandre autonome ("autonomous diving set"), scaphandre Cousteau-Gagnan ("Cousteau-Gagnan diving set"), or CG45 were meaningful enough for commercialization, but to sell his invention in English-speaking countries, Cousteau needed an appealing name following English language standards. He then coined the trade name Aqua-Lung.

In the late 1940s and early 1950s, La Spirotechnique started exporting the Aqua-Lung and leasing its patent to foreign companies like the British Siebe Gorman. The equipment was a great success compared to the Rouquayrol-Denayrouze apparatus, which was limited because the technology of its time could only produce compressed-air tanks that could hold 30 atmospheres, which allowed dives of only 30 minutes at no more than ten meters depth. Before 1945, French divers preferred the traditional standard diving dress with copper helmet and surface supplied breathing air. When the Aqua-Lung became available for commercial use, divers around the world found the Cousteau-Gagnan equipment smaller and easier to use than either the Le Prieur or Rouquayrol-Denayrouze apparatus. The Aqua-Lung also could be mounted on stronger and more reliable air tanks holding up to 200 atmospheres, allowing extension of diving duration to more than an hour at significant depths, including the time needed for decompression stops.

The first Cousteau-Gagnan Aqua-Lungs (like the CG45 of 1945 or the Mistral of 1955) were twin-hose open-circuit scuba. Similar configurations have since been made by various manufacturers with varying design details and numbers of cylinders. Like open-circuit scuba with single-hose regulators, they consisted of one or more high pressure diving cylinders and a diving regulator (the Aqua-Lung) that supplied the diver with breathing gas at ambient pressure via a demand valve. For more than ten years, seen in the films Épaves (Shipwrecks, 1943) and Le Monde du silence (The Silent World, 1956) the main scuba equipment used by Cousteau and his divers was an Aqua-Lung mounted on three diving cylinders, one being used as a reserve. The Aqua-Lung allowed divers to spend more time underwater, and, along with the invention of several underwater cameras, to film and explore more freely.

== Competition ==
The Aqua-Lung was not the first self contained underwater breathing apparatus, but it was the first to be widely popular. In 1934, René Commeinhes developed a firefighter's breathing apparatus which was adapted for diving as the G.C. - 42, and patented in April, 1942 (no.976,590) by his son Georges in 1937. It was used by the French Navy during the first few years of World War II. It was an open circuit system supplied from two 200 bar cylinders, and used a single stage regulator to supply gas to a bag between the two back-mounted cylinders at slightly above ambient pressure. The gas was then supplied to the left side of a full-face mask by a corrugated rubber hose, and exhausted directly from the right side of the mask.

It is not clear who invented the first single hose regulator. The invention was motivated by an effort to bypass Aqua-Lung's patent on the twin-hose regulator, which involved the return of exhaust gas to the regulator to reduce the differential pressure and therefore reduce the amount and variation of over- or under-pressure of the breathing gas in the lungs. The single hose regulator accomplishes this by relocating the second stage pressure sensing diaphragm to the point of exhaust at the mouthpiece, rather than routing the exhaust back to the regulator diaphragm at the cylinder.

An advertisement in Popular Mechanics of October 1950 offered a single hose regulator for sale by Divers Supply in Wilmington, California. At about the same time as Divers Supply began selling the Sport Diver regulator, Australian Ted Eldred designed a two stage single hose regulator which he marketed in Australia as the Porpoise. Virtually all modern open-circuit scuba regulators use the single-hose two-stage design, though Aqualung did market a modernised twin-hose Mistral model in 2005 and 2006.

== Trademark issues ==
Aqualung, Aqua-Lung, and Aqua Lung are registered trademarks for scuba diving breathing equipment. That trade name was originally owned in the United States by a company known as U.S. Divers (that later became Aqualung America). The term was in use before the trademark was registered by René Bussoz, who owned a sporting goods store called René Sports in Los Angeles. He obtained a contract with Air Liquide, the parent company of La Spirotechnique, to import the new scuba equipment into the United States for sale on the Pacific coast (SPACO Inc. had the contract for the Atlantic coast). Bussoz changed the name of his company to U.S. Divers and registered the name Aqua-Lung. This turned out to be a wise move, because when the French company decided not to renew his five-year contract, no one had even heard of their product, but everyone was familiar with the names he had registered. Bussoz sold the company and the trade names for a handsome profit, returning to France. The name "U.S. Divers" sounded very official and very American, but it was owned by a Frenchman and sold to a French company.

Air Liquide held the patent on the original "Aqualung" (also written as "Aqua-Lung" or "Aqua Lung") until the patent expired sometime around 1960 to 1963. The term "Aqualung", as far as is known, first appeared in print on page 3 of Jacques-Yves Cousteau's first book, The Silent World, in 1953. Public use of the word "aqualung", and public interest in Aqualungs and scuba diving, were started around 1953 in English-speaking counties by a National Geographical Society Magazine article about Cousteau's underwater archaeological expedition to Grand Congloué. In France, aqualung diving was popularized by Cousteau's movie Épaves, while his book The Silent World also helped significantly.

As with some other registered trademarks, the term "aqualung" became a genericized trademark in English-speaking countries as a result of common use by the public and in publications, including the BSAC's official diving manuals. Presumably, lawyers for Cousteau or Air Liquide could have slowed or stopped this genericization by taking prompt action, but this seems not to have been done in Britain, where Siebe Gorman held the British rights to both the trade name and the patent.

In the United States, the term aqualung was popularized by the popular television series Sea Hunt (1958), in which actual Aqua-Lungs appeared in early episodes. This series never said that a scuba regulator could be called anything else, or made by anyone else, but the Voit Rubber Corporation provided most of the diving equipment used in the series, and supplied Mike Nelson, the lead character. The word "aqualung" was commonly used in speech and in publications as a term for an open-circuit, demand valve-controlled breathing apparatus (even after Air Liquide's patent expired and other manufacturers started making identical equipment), occasionally also for rebreathers, and in figurative uses (such as "the water spider's aqualung of air bubbles"). The word entered the Russian language as the generic noun акваланг ("akvalang"). That word was taken into Lithuanian as the generic noun "akvalangas"; "langas" happens to be Lithuanian for "window", giving a literal meaning "aqua-window".

In the United States, U.S. Divers managed to keep "Aqualung" as a trademark. The acronym "SCUBA", or "Self Contained Underwater Breathing Apparatus", originated in the United States Navy, where it referred to a frogman's oxygen rebreather designed by Christian J. Lambertsen. SCUBA became the generic term for any type of self-contained breathing set for diving, and soon the acronym SCUBA became a common noun – "scuba" – all in lower-case. "Scuba" was a trademark for a time – used by Healthways, now known as Scubapro – one of the competitors of U.S. Divers.

In Britain, Siebe Gorman (who held the rights to the tradename "Aqualung") made no serious attempt to control use of the word, and "aqualung" remained a common public generic word for that sort of apparatus – including in the British Sub-Aqua Club's official publications – for many years.

Aqua Lung America, the current name of the U.S. Divers Company, now makes rebreathers whose tradenames or catalog descriptions include the word "Aqualung". The name U.S. Divers is now used as a trademark by Aqua Lung America for its line of snorkeling equipment.

== See also ==
- Timeline of diving technology – Chronological list of notable events in the history of underwater diving equipment
- History of scuba diving – Origins and development of diving using breathing gas carried by the diver
- Scuba set – Self-contained underwater breathing apparatus
- Diving regulator – Mechanism that controls the pressure of a breathing gas supply for diving
