= The Silent World =

1956 documentary film by Jacques Cousteau and Louis Malle

- Promotional release poster
- French: Le Monde du silence
- Directed by: Jacques Cousteau; Louis Malle
- Written by: Jacques Cousteau; James Dugan
- Based on: The Silent World: A Story of Undersea Discovery and Adventure by Jacques Cousteau
- Produced by: Jacques-Yves Cousteau; Marcel Ichac; Jacques Mauger
- Starring: Jacques Cousteau
- Cinematography: Louis Malle; Underwater photography: Philippe Agostino
- Edited by: Georges Alépée
- Music by: Yves Baudrier
- Production companies: FSJYC Production; Requins Associés; Société Filmad; Titanus
- Distributed by: Rank
- Release dates: 26 May 1956 (Cannes); 15 August 1956 (Japan)
- Running time: 86 minutes
- Country: France
- Language: French
- Box office: $3 million (rentals)

The Silent World (French: Le Monde du silence) is a 1956 French documentary film co-directed by Jacques Cousteau and Louis Malle. One of the first films to use underwater cinematography to show the ocean depths in color, its title derives from Cousteau's 1953 book The Silent World: A Story of Undersea Discovery and Adventure.

== Film ==
The film was shot aboard the ship Calypso. Cousteau and his team of divers shot 25 kilometers of film over two years in the Mediterranean Sea, the Persian Gulf, the Red Sea and the Indian Ocean, of which 2.5 kilometers were included in the finished documentary.

The film later faced criticism for environmental damage done during the filmmaking. In one scene, the crew of the Calypso massacre a school of sharks that were drawn to the carcass of a baby whale for some reason, which itself had been mortally injured by the crew, albeit accidentally (Cousteau had the ship driven into a pod of whales to get a close-up view, striking one whale in the process before the baby was lacerated by the prop). In another, Cousteau uses dynamite near a coral reef in order to make a more complete census of the marine life in its vicinity. Cousteau later became more environmentally conscious, involved in marine conservation, and was even called "the father of the environmental movement" by Ted Turner.

== Reception ==
The Silent World opened at the 1956 Cannes Film Festival and won the Palme d'Or award; it was the only documentary film to win the award until Michael Moore's Fahrenheit 9/11 repeated the feat in 2004.

The film was released in the United States on September 24, 1956 by Columbia Pictures and earned theatrical rentals of over $3 million.

It was the first of Cousteau's documentary films to win an Academy Award for Best Documentary Feature Film.

== See also ==
- World Without Sun – 1964 documentary film by Jacques Cousteau
- Voyage to the Edge of the World – 1976 French nature documentary
