= Joachim Wendler =

German aquanaut (1939–1975)

Joachim Wendler (June 6, 1939, in Erfurt, Germany – September 25, 1975, in Rockport, Massachusetts) was a West German aquanaut who died of an air embolism while returning to the surface of the Gulf of Maine from the Helgoland underwater habitat. He was participating in a checkout mission for the First International Saturation Study of Herring and Hydroacoustics (FISSHH) project.

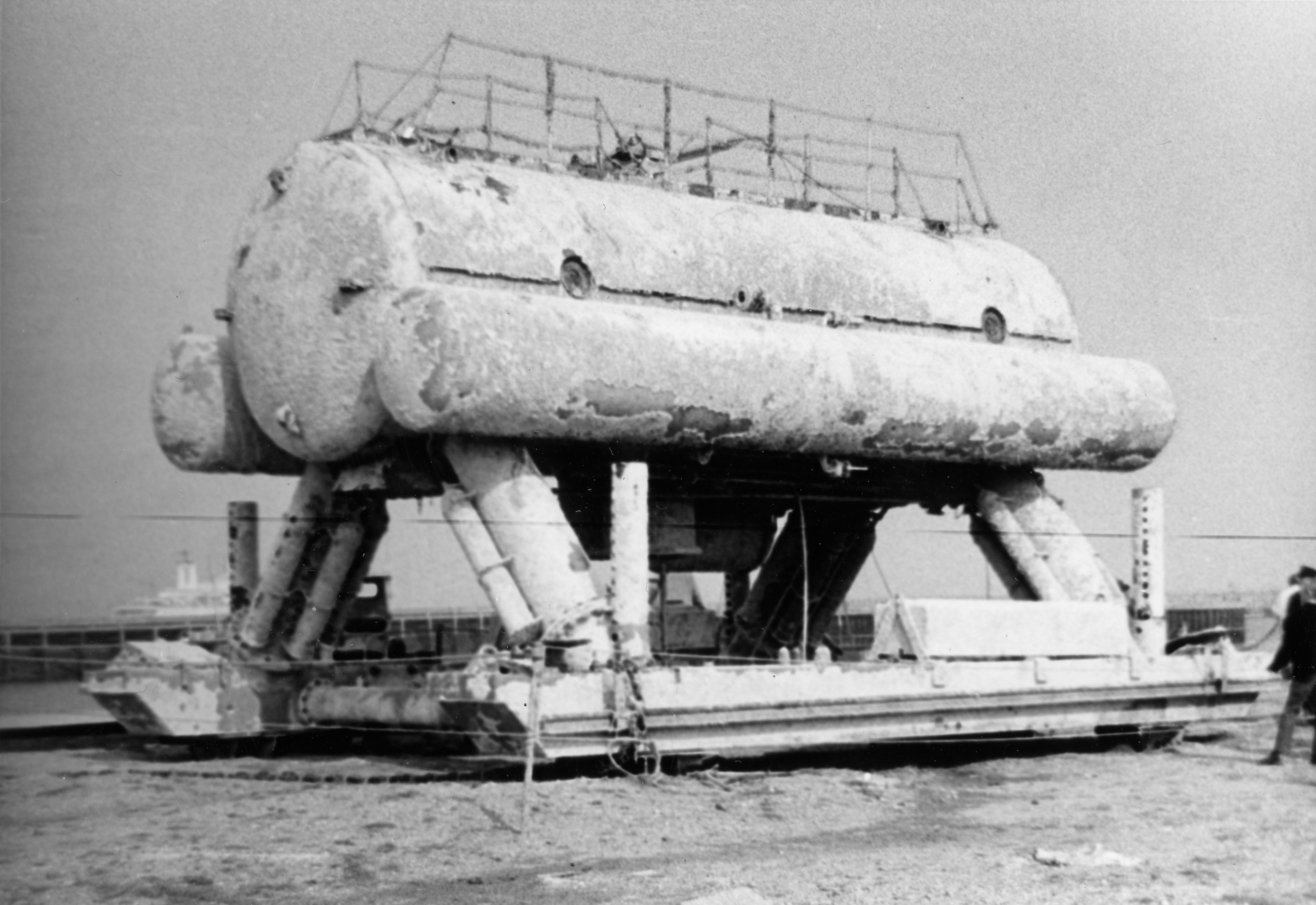
The Helgoland Habitat

Wendler, a 36-year-old experienced diver, and two other German aquanauts began the two-day/two-night checkout mission on September 21, 1975. All three divers were employees of the German firm Gesellschaft fur Kernenergieverwertung in Schiffbau und Schiffahrt mbH (GKSS), which operated the Helgoland Habitat. On September 23 the three Germans were joined by two American divers: Lieutenant Commander Laurence Bussey of the United States Navy, the head of the project for the National Oceanic and Atmospheric Administration (NOAA), and Roger Clifford, a fisheries scientist from NOAA's laboratory at Woods Hole. Wendler, Bussey, and another of the German aquanauts, Joachim Rediske, proceeded to undergo a 49-hour decompression inside Helgoland, which was completed at 6:30 p.m. on September 24. Their return to the surface was then delayed by 15 hours due to bad weather and in order to enable them to surface in daylight.

At 11:30 a.m. on September 25 the three aquanauts surfaced; Wendler was hampered by gear he was carrying. It was later theorized by Captain George F. Bond, the "Father of Saturation Diving", who was participating in the project, that Wendler may have been lifted ten feet or more by a passing swell just after taking a deep breath. The change in pressure would have allowed bubbles from his lungs to enter his circulatory system. In the final 15 feet before reaching the surface, Wendler suffered a massive gas embolism.

Having reached the surface, Wendler clung to a buoy and waved for help. He was brought by the diving tender boat to Rockport, Massachusetts, and received oxygen, mouth-to-mouth resuscitation and external heart massage aboard the boat. Upon arrival in Rockport, Wendler was placed in a portable recompression chamber at the project's headquarters at the Ralph Waldo Emerson Inn, where he was recompressed to 165 feet. Wendler spent two hours in the chamber, attended by GKSS medical supervisor Anthony Low, M.D., before being pronounced dead.

NOAA convened a board of investigation, headed by Dr. J. Morgan Wells of NOAA's Manned Undersea Science and Technology (MUST) office. The board concluded that Wendler's death "was in no way connected with the systems in the habitat or the decompression procedures". NOAA Associate Administrator David Wallace ordered that, in order for FISSHH to continue, a recompression chamber must be made available on the dive boat.

On November 21, 1975, an American aquanaut experienced either central nervous system bends or an embolism on surfacing from Helgoland; he was successfully treated but experienced some residual disability. Captain Bond later said that the FISSHH project had as many serious safety incidents as he could remember in a project of similar length. Joachim Wendler was the world's second aquanaut to die as a result of participating in an underwater habitat project, the first having been SEALAB III aquanaut Berry L. Cannon.
