= Chamberland =

Chamberland may refer to:

== People ==
- Charles Chamberland (1851–1908), French inventor of the autoclave device,
- Dennis Chamberland (b. 1951), American bioengineer, explorer, and author,

== Other ==
- Chamberland Commission, Public inquiry into protection of journalistic sources in Quebec,
