= Helgoland Habitat =

Ambient pressure underwater habitat

Coordinates: 54°18′20″N 13°06′57″E

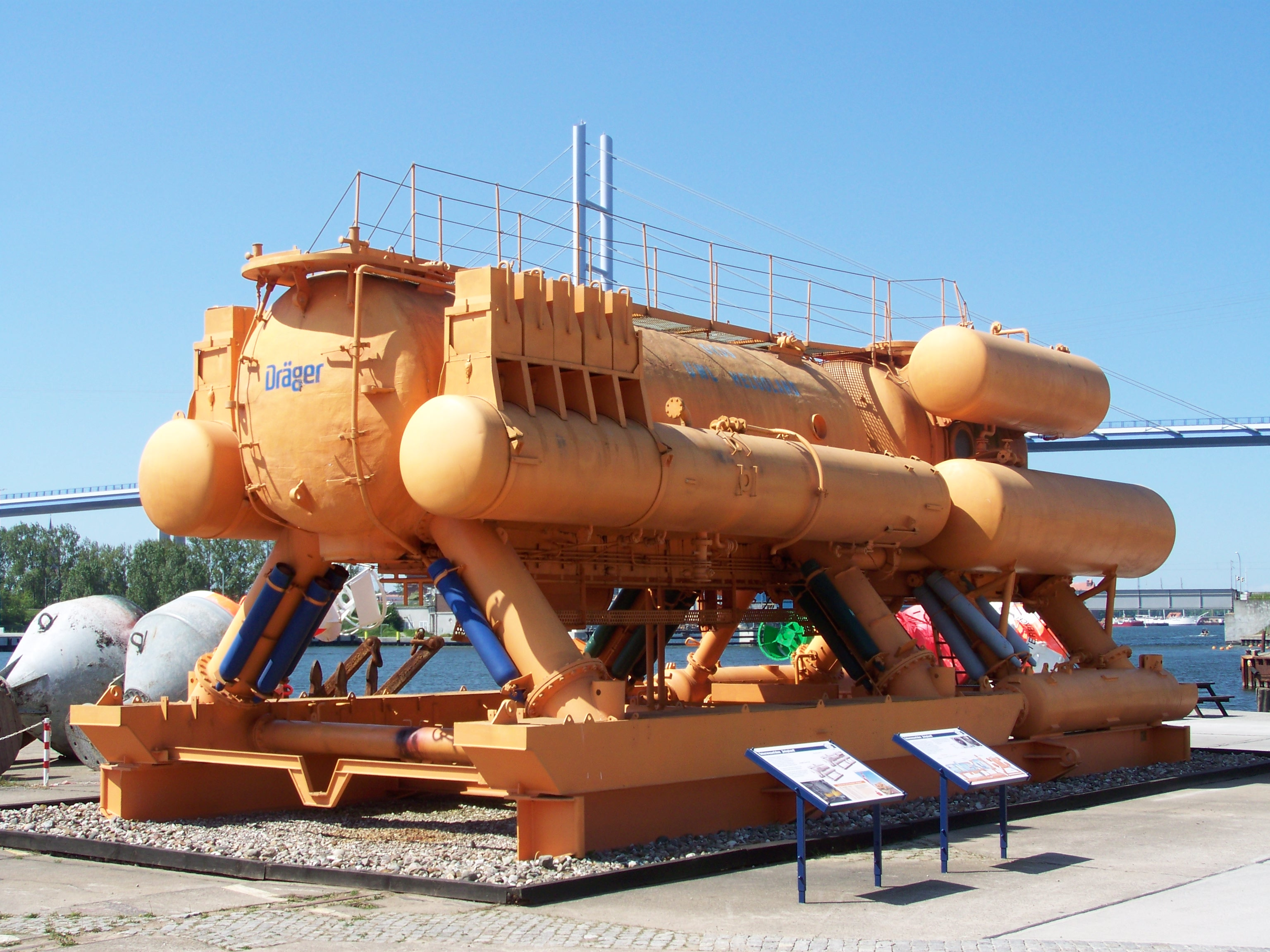
The Helgoland underwater laboratory (UWL) at Nautineum, Stralsund (Germany)

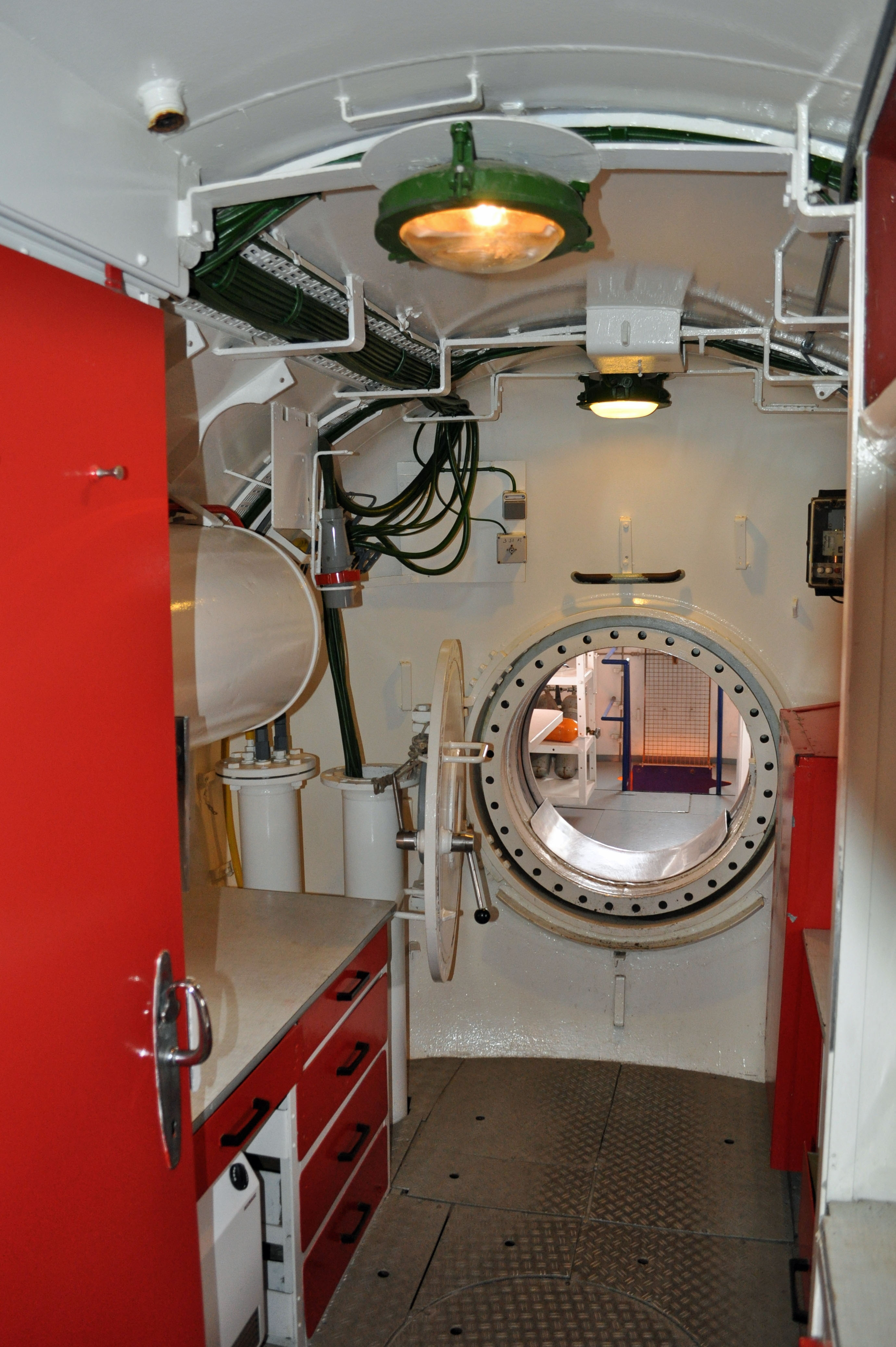
Interior of the Helgoland UWL

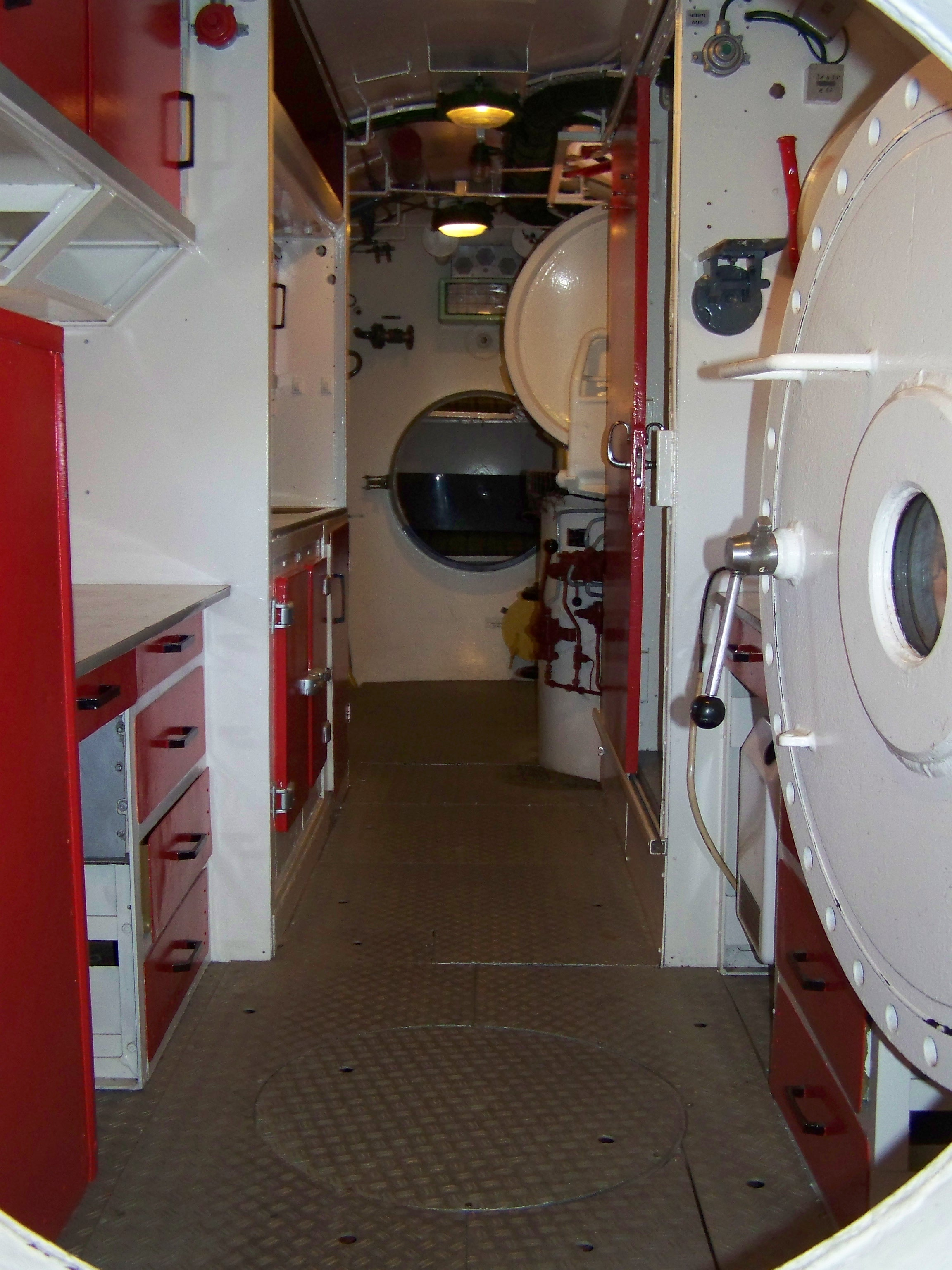
Interior of the Helgoland UWL

The Helgoland underwater laboratory (UWL) is an underwater habitat. It was built by Dräger in Lübeck, Germany in 1968 for the Biological Institute Helgoland, and was the first of its kind in the world built for use in colder waters. It is named after the island Helgoland.

The habitat allowed divers to spend several weeks under water using saturation diving techniques. The scientists and technicians would live and work in the laboratory, returning there after each dive. Only once they had reached the end of their stay did they decompress in the UWL itself, being able to then resurface without coming to any harm. After experience gained in the first deployment, a wet section was added.

The UWL was used in the waters of the North and Baltic Seas and, in 1975, on Jeffreys Ledge, in the Gulf of Maine along the coast of New England in the United States.

== History ==
The station was delivered to the GKSS Research Center in Geesthacht in 1972. It was used until 1981 in the Baltic Sea, the North Sea and the North Atlantic. The first stage of deployment was in 1969 off Helgoland. During this deployment Karl-Heinz Schumann and the student Winfried Kreytenberg died on 6 December 1969 at a depth of 25 meters south-east of the island Düne during work on the underwater laboratory while disconnecting the underwater laboratory and the supply line.

The laboratory was lifted by the floating crane "Magnus 4" in April 1970 and placed on the mole of the South Helgoland harbour.

Further deployments were off Eckernförde at 9 m depth, off Helgoland again in 1973 in 23 m depth, in Lübeck Bay in 1974 in 15 m depth, off Rockport in 1975 in 33 m depth and from 1975 to 1981 in Lübeck Bay between 11 and 15 m depth. On September 25, 1975, German aquanaut Joachim Wendler died of an decompression sickness while returning to the surface of the Gulf of Maine from Helgoland. He was participating in a checkout mission for the First International Saturation Study of Herring and Hydroacoustics (FISSHH) project.

At the end of the 1970s the laboratory was decommissioned, and in the summer of 1998 it was donated to the German Oceanographic Museum by the GKSS Research Centre, Geesthacht. It can be visited at the Nautineum, an outpost of the museum in Stralsund.

== Technical data ==
The interior of the UWL Helgoland consists of a living area 2.5 m long, an instrumentation and engine room 6.5 m long and since 1973 a wet laboratory 4 m long. With a diameter of 2.5 m, this provided a useful area of 32.5 m^{2}. The laboratory provided all necessary facilities for a stay of several weeks on the seabed. The internal pressure was the same as the external pressure, and decompression from saturation was done at the end of the mission.

The habitat had air conditioning and good thermal insulation. It was lowered by flooding the ballast tanks with seawater, and raised by blowing the water out of the tanks using compressed air.

Principal dimensions:

Overall length: 14 meters
Overall width: 7 meters
Total height: 7 meters
Total weight (with ballast): 110 tonnes
