= Scott Carpenter Space Analog Station =

NASA underwater habitat

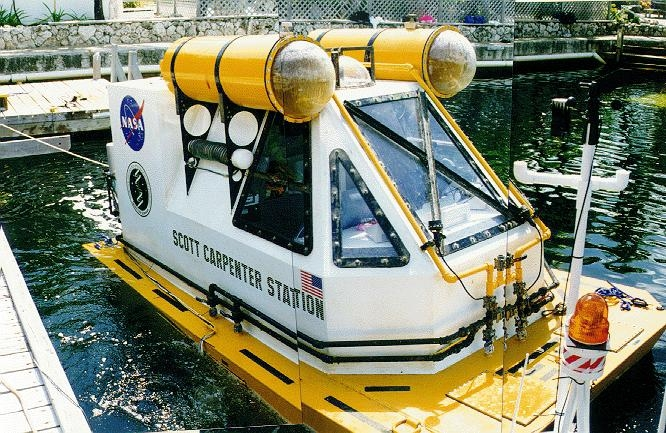
- Scott Carpenter Space Analog Station

General information
- Type: Underwater research and ocean exploration
- Opened: September 1997

Dimensions
- Weight: 21,000 lbs.

Technical details
- Size: Crew: 2

Design and construction
- Developer: Dennis Chamberland; Joseph M. Bishop
- Other designers: Precision Fabricating, Inc.

The Scott Carpenter Space Analog Station was designed by the National Aeronautics and Space Administration (NASA) as a seafloor research station—or underwater habitat. It was designed by NASA Aquanaut, Dennis Chamberland and Marine Engineer, Joseph M. Bishop and named in honor of the Mercury project astronaut and SEALAB (US Navy) aquanaut M. Scott Carpenter. It was used on two missions in the summer of 1997 and 1998 on the seafloor near Key Largo, Florida at the Marine Resources Development Foundation .

== Specificity ==
The Scott Carpenter Station was the only habitat ever designed to be launched from a wheeled trailer, much like a boat. This design feature enabled it to be transported to schools and other venues for touring and educational outreach between missions. The education and outreach function was one of its primary features, and figured importantly in its missions. Many classroom to seafloor connections were made, including links to schools in Oklahoma, Florida, California and north of the Arctic Circle in Canada's Baffin Bay such as Pond Inlet, Nunavut.

== Timeline ==
In 1997, the Scott Carpenter Space Analog Station became one of four existing seafloor habitats operational in the world. During the summers of 1997 and 1998, all four of the world's operational habitats were located within 15 nautical miles (28 km) of each other, and three of them were within 50 feet (15 m) of one another in Key Largo: The Scott Carpenter Station, The MarineLab Research Station and the undersea hotel—the Jules Undersea Lodge . The fourth habitat, the Aquarius (laboratory) habitat was located just offshore near Key Largo inside the Florida Keys National Marine Sanctuary.

=== Mission One - 1997 ===
The Scott Carpenter Space Analog Station's first mission was launched in September 1997. This mission included a shakedown and full functional test of its design and engineering systems. It also included a visit by NASA astronaut, Dr. Bob Phillips as well as links to schools and classrooms. The link schedule also included linkage with a NASA team of investigators in isolation at the Johnson Space Center where they were testing long term, advanced life support systems. On board the Scott Carpenter Station, investigators also tested space life support systems for growth of plants in remote and extreme environments.

=== Mission Two - 1998 ===
After the success of Mission One, the station was outfitted for an expanded mission during the following summer in what was known as the NASA Challenge Mission . The Challenge Mission ran concurrently with the Space Shuttle Mission STS-95, the mission which featured veteran astronaut John Glenn. At the launch of the Space Shuttle, the Scott Carpenter Station Mission Commander, Dennis Chamberland and his crew embarked for an unbroken 11-day stay on the seafloor for the same period the Space Shuttle was in space. Following the flight, visitors to the seafloor station included motion picture director James Cameron, who conferenced with students in Pond Inlet, Nunavut via satellite phone, as well as producer Eugene Roddenberry II and Mount Everest Explorer–climber, Tom Whittaker. In 1997, the station logged more than 36 days of crewed missions on the seafloor.

=== Transfer to the Space Foundation ===
In 2013, the Scott Carpenter Station moved to the Space Foundation Discovery Center in Colorado Springs, Colo., as part of its display of space artifacts.
