= Dennis Chamberland =

American bioengineer

- Born: 1951 (age 74–75)
- Citizenship: United States
- Education: Oklahoma State University
- Engineering career
- Discipline: Bioengineering, nuclear engineering, space life sciences
- Employers: NASA (1987–2017); U.S. Navy (Civilian)
- Projects: Scott Carpenter Space Analog Station; OCEAN Project; Atlantica Expeditions
- Significant design: NASA Advanced Space Life Support Systems
- Awards: Nuclear Professional of the Year (2018)

Dennis Chamberland (born 1951) is an American bioengineer, explorer, author, award-winning nuclear engineer, space life scientist, and aquanaut. He was Mission Commander for seven NASA underwater missions, and designed and built the NASA Scott Carpenter Space Analog Station underwater habitat.

== Career ==
=== Naval service and civilian engineering ===
Following his role as a United States Naval Officer and after completing graduate studies at his OSU alma mater, he again worked with the Navy as a civilian U.S. Government Nuclear Engineer. Dennis was a radiological control professional for Navy Nuclear submarines and was involved in a Nuclear Emergency Planning study at the Harvard School of Public Health.

In 1986, Chamberland published a landmark cover story on Genetic Engineering in Christianity Today magazine. That same year, Chamberland also published an in-depth interview with General William Westmoreland in the U.S. Naval Institute Proceedings that lent a critical insight on the United States' involvement in the Vietnam War. Chamberland's interview with Astronaut/Aquanaut Scott Carpenter in a U.S. Naval Institute Proceedings 1989 article focused on the splashdowns of human spaceflight missions was reprinted in August 2021. At the turn of the 21st century, Chamberland had published nearly 100 articles and reference works, mostly dealing with scientific and technical issues. He began writing books and novels in 1994 and has over 19 works in publication.

=== Human colonization of undersea regions ===
Dennis Chamberland had maintained a lifelong interest in the human colonization of the undersea regions of Earth. He calls these regions "Aquatica" and its permanent human citizens "Aquaticans." Chamberland released the seminal work "Undersea Colonies" in 2007 in which he describes the possibility of permanent human colonization of the seas.

Dennis Chamberland has made three concerted efforts to date at this process, the first of which began in 1972 while he was a college student at Oklahoma State University. It was his attempt to begin the undersea settlement process beneath Tenkiller Ferry Lake in eastern Oklahoma. His interest continued, and he began another serious push in 1991, forming a corporate venture called the "League of the New Worlds." Combining his interest in space and ocean explorations, he reasoned that the technologies were in many ways twin technologies. Holding the position as a NASA Life Scientist and developer of Advanced Space Life Support Systems considered for Moon and Mars bases based on Controlled Ecological Life Support Systems (CELSS) for the space agency, he was able to view the two technologies developing simultaneously for all off-planet habitation pursuits. While at the Agency, Chamberland coined the term “Resource Recovery,” which replaced the term “waste processing” in all advanced human life support systems.

=== NASA ===
In the 1994 NASA space analog research experiment titled the OCEAN (Ocean CELSS Experimental Analog-NASA) Project, Principal Investigator Dennis Chamberland, now a certified aquanaut, planted and harvested the first NASA agricultural crop grown in a crewed habitat on the sea floor off Key Largo incorporating NASA CELSS technology in a remote and extreme environment. Within two years, Dennis Chamberland had designed and built the NASA Scott Carpenter Space Analog Station (SCSAS), a two-man undersea habitat. Chamberland successfully operated his undersea station near Key Largo, Florida, for two NASA missions accompanied by the Station Chief Engineer, Joseph M. Bishop.

==== First mission ====
The first mission conducted a shakedown and full functional test of the Scott Carpenter Station's design and engineering systems. It involved a visit by NASA Astronaut Dr. Bob Phillips, as well as education and outreach links to schools and classrooms. The link schedule also included linkage with a NASA team of investigators in isolation at the Johnson Space Center, where they were testing long term, advanced life support systems. On board the Scott Carpenter Station, investigators also tested space life support systems for growth of plants in remote and extreme environments. It then ran an unbroken undersea mission concurrently with Space Shuttle Atlantis mission STS-86 from 25 September through 6 October 1997 and was part of the NASA-Park Seed Company "SEEDS in Space" program. SEEDS stands for Space Exposed Experiment Developed for Students – a project that has given millions of students around the U.S. and the world an opportunity to do serious, hands-on science with living material that has been to outer space and back. Park Seed donated over 20 pounds of tomato seed, which were exposed to deep space conditions for the mission, then returned to Earth for observation and germination tests. Concurrently, 20 pounds of tomato seed were lowered to NASA's Scott Carpenter Space Analog Station with Chamberland as Mission Commander. A 20-pound control group was maintained at the Park Seed facility in Greenwood, South Carolina. After the conclusion of the Atlantis STS-86 and SCSAS concurrent missions, their seeds were returned to Park Seed for packaging, and some 300,000 packets were then distributed by NASA to schools throughout America as part of NASA's "Mission to America's Remarkable Students" (MARS) outreach program created and implemented by Chamberland. Students were encouraged to grow tomatoes from the "Space Base," "Sea Base," and "Earth Base" seeds, and track the growth and other characteristics.

==== Second mission ====
Following the success of the 1997 mission, the Station was outfitted for an expanded mission during the following summer in what was known as the NASA Challenge Mission with Chamberland as Mission Commander, and logged more than 36 days of crewed missions on the seafloor. A portion of the Challenge Mission ran concurrently with Space Shuttle Discovery's mission STS-95 – John Glenn's return to space mission – from 29 October through 7 November 1998. At the launch of the Space Shuttle, Scott Carpenter Station Mission Commander Dennis Chamberland and his crew embarked on an unbroken 11-day stay on the seafloor for the same period the Space Shuttle was in space, conducting education and outreach links with schools, education centers, and museums. Visitors to the seafloor Scott Carpenter Station during the Challenge Mission included motion picture director and writer James Cameron, who conferenced with students north of the Arctic Circle in Pond Inlet, Nunavut, via satellite phone, as well as producer Eugene "Rod" Roddenberry II, and Tom Whittaker – the first disabled person to climb to the summit of Mount Everest.

==== Third attempt ====
Dennis Chamberland began his third attempt at launching the first permanent undersea colony in the Gulf of Mexico in Florida Bay in 1998–1999 called the Trident Project. That project was later reorganized in late 2006 as the Atlantica Expeditions. Chamberland is the author of the landmark book Undersea Colonies and is generally considered the world's leading expert on permanent human undersea colonization. He was featured in National Geographic’s documentary series Naked Science "City Under the Sea" episode and Motherboard’s "The Aquatic Life of Dennis Chamberland"

==== Oversight of animals at NASA ====
While at NASA, Dennis Chamberland was one of the longest serving NASA Chairmen of any Center's Institutional Animal Care and Use Committees, holding the position for 14 years and reviewing every vertebrate animal research payload that flew on Shuttle, or to Mir Space Station or the ISS from Shuttle. Chamberland was also a Principal Investigator for the landmark scientific study conducted by a team from the John F. Kennedy Space Center, Brookhaven National Laboratory, McKnight Brain Institute at the University of Florida, and Cold Spring Harbor Laboratory that inquired into the chronic neurological effects of galactic space radiation related to a crewed mission to Mars utilizing the Brookhaven Collider-Accelerator. The 2006 study was titled "Quiescent adult neural stem cells are exceptionally sensitive to cosmic radiation" and was published in Experimental Neurology in 2007.

In 2018, Dennis Chamberland was awarded the Nuclear Professional of the Year Award from the International Atomic Energy Agency – ISOE North American Technical Center.

== Retirement ==
Dennis Chamberland retired from NASA in 2017 after a 30-year career at the John F. Kennedy Space Center and accepted a position at the Wings of Eagles Discovery Center in Elmira, New York, assisting Dr. Corinne Rutzky in designing and creating a 20,000 square foot Mars Base display for STEM students named "Mars Base One." Chamberland also created and produced all of the audio/visual displays for the project.

== Departing Earth Forever ==
In 2022 Dennis Chamberland published the two-volume book titled "Departing Earth Forever" in which he projected the end of the obsolete Apollo model of human space exploration and its replacement. Chamberland defined the new human exploration model by his “First Principle of Human Exploration.” The revised human exploration philosophy is built on the principle that “In every exploration system, we must require the systems we build to adapt to the human standard rather than expect the human to adapt to the machine or the environment – and in every design activity we will protect the human as a primary objective.” In his publications research, Dennis Chamberland discovered in the scientific literature a human pathology resulting in a wide spectrum of diseases of the sensitive epithelial and endothelial tissues of the body he has identified as “Cosmic Radiation Induced Sensitive-Tissue Pathology” or CRISP disorders. These diseases are expressed in humans who are exposed to full spectrum cosmic radiation for an unknown duration, perhaps in exposures in as little as a week, according to some early results of research on NASA Apollo Lunar astronauts. Dennis Chamberland also coined the term “Hiroshima Unit” to enumerate human radiation exposures that are at or above the level that can statistically predict the probability of delayed carcinogens in those exposed to such levels.

== Bibliography ==
Science and Technology Books

- Undersea Colonies ISBN 978-1-889422-15-2
- Undersea Colonies II - Foundations of a New Empire ISBN 978-1-889422-31-2
- The Proxima Manual of Space Exploration ISBN 978-1-889422-02-2
- Thriving in the Days of COVID-19 ISBN 978-1-889422-35-0
- Departing Earth Forever: Book One - Warning and Promise ISBN 978-1-889422-33-6
- Departing Earth Forever: Book Two - Alien Worlds ISBN 978-1-889422-34-3

Novels

- Abyss of Elysium – Mars Wars ISBN 978-1-889422-06-0
- Alyete – Dogs of Eros Damned ISBN 978-1-889422-11-4

Aaron Seven Trilogy Series

- Aaron Seven - Quantum Storms ISBN 978-1-889422-08-4
- Aaron Seven - Abyss of Space ISBN 978-1-889422-13-8
- Aaron Seven - Apocalypse Moon ISBN 978-1-889422-28-2
- Aaron Seven - Aquatica ISBN 978-1-889422-30-5

Children of God Series

- Consuming Fire ISBN 978-1-889422-00-8
- The Way Back Home ISBN 978-1-889422-09-1
- Proverbs for My Children - 2nd Edition ISBN 978-1-889422-04-6
- Eternity's Child ISBN 978-1-889422-24-4
- Eventide ISBN 978-1-889422-25-1
- Psalms of Ascent at Noon 978-1-889422-29-9
