= Underwater habitat =

Human habitable underwater enclosure filled with breathable gas

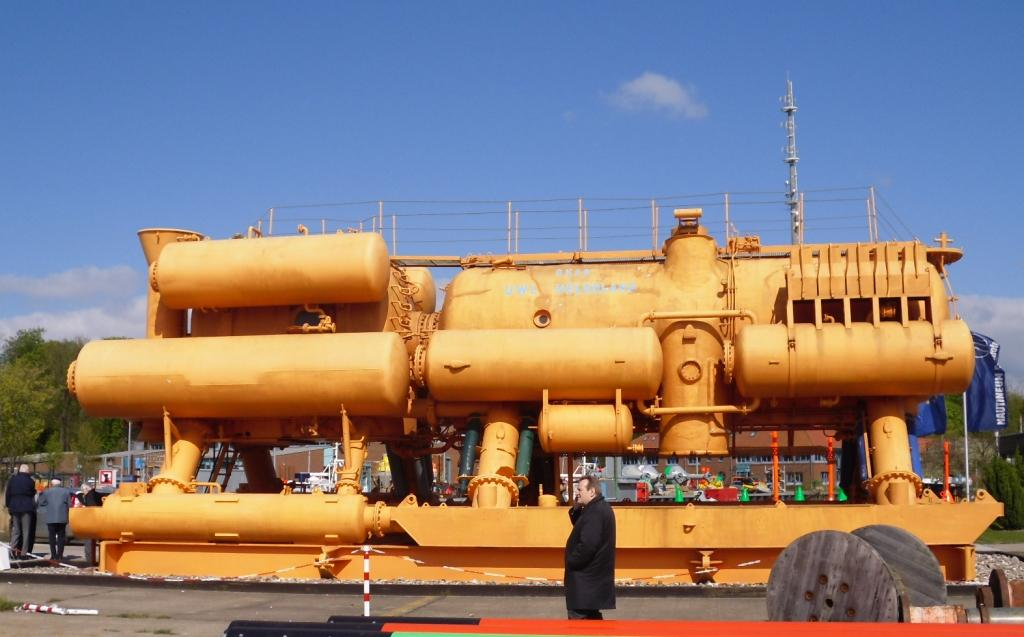
German underwater laboratory, "Helgoland", 2010

Underwater habitats are a form of subsea technology. They are underwater structures in which people can live for extended periods and carry out most of the basic human functions of a 24-hour day, such as working, resting, eating, attending to personal hygiene and sleeping. In this context, 'habitat' is generally used in a narrow sense to mean the interior and immediate exterior of the structure and its fixtures, but not its surrounding marine environment. Most early underwater habitats lacked regenerative systems for air, water, food, electricity, and other resources. However, some underwater habitats allow for these resources to be delivered using pipes, or generated within the habitat, rather than manually delivered.

An underwater habitat has to meet the needs of human physiology and provide suitable environmental conditions, and the one which is most critical is breathing gas of suitable quality. Others concern the physical environment (pressure, temperature, light, humidity), the chemical environment (drinking water, food, waste products, toxins) and the biological environment (hazardous sea creatures, microorganisms, marine fungi). Much of the science covering underwater habitats and their technology designed to meet human requirements is shared with diving, diving bells, submersible vehicles and submarines, and spacecraft. It incorporates various developments used in other forms of subsea technology.

Numerous underwater habitats have been designed, built and used around the world since as early as the start of the 1960s, either by private individuals or by government agencies. They have been used almost exclusively for research and exploration, but in recent years, at least one underwater habitat has been provided for recreation and tourism. Research has been devoted particularly to the physiological processes and limits of breathing gases under pressure, for aquanaut, as well as astronaut training and for research on marine ecosystems.

== Terminology and scope ==
The term 'underwater habitat' is used for a range of applications, including some structures that are not exclusively underwater while operational, but all include a significant underwater component. There may be some overlap between underwater habitats and submersible vessels, and between structures which are completely submerged and those which have some part extending above the surface when in operation.

In 1970 G. Haux stated:

At this point it must also be said that it is not easy to sharply define the term "underwater laboratory". One may argue whether Link's diving chamber which was used in the "Man-in-Sea I" project, may be called an underwater laboratory. But the Bentos 300, planned by the Soviets, is not so easy to classify as it has a certain ability to maneuver. Therefore, the possibility exists that this diving hull is classified elsewhere as a submersible. Well, a certain generosity can not hurt.

=== Comparison with surface based diving operations ===
In an underwater habitat, observations can be carried out at any hour to study the behavior of both diurnal and nocturnal organisms. Habitats in shallow water can be used to accommodate divers from greater depths for a major portion of the decompression required. This principle was used in the project Conshelf II. Saturation dives provide the opportunity to dive with shorter intervals than possible from the surface, and risks associated with diving and ship operations at night can be minimized. In the habitat La Chalupa, 35% of all dives took place at night. To perform the same amount of useful work diving from the surface instead of from La Chalupa, an estimated eight hours of decompression time would have been necessary every day.

However, maintaining an underwater habitat is much more expensive and logistically difficult than diving from the surface. It also restricts the diving to a much more limited area.

== Technical classification and description ==
=== Architectural variations ===
Floating; The habitat is in the underwater hull of a floating structure. In the Sea Orbiter example this part should reach a depth of 30 metres (98 ft). The advantage of this type is horizontal mobility. Safety logistics are also easier due to immediate access to the atmosphere.
Access shaft to the surface The habitat is accessible via a shaft to above the water surface. The depth of submersion is quite limited. However, normal atmospheric pressure can be maintained inside so that visitors do not have to undergo any decompression. This type is generally used inshore such as the underwater restaurant Ithaa in the Maldives or Red Sea Star (closed in 2012) in Eilat, Israel.
Semi-autonomous; Habitats of this type are accessible only by diving, but energy and breathing gas are supplied by an umbilical cable. Most stations are of this type, such as Aquarius, SEALAB I and II and Helgoland
Autonomous; The station has its own reserves of energy and breathing gas and is able to maneuver itself (at least in the vertical direction). This type is similar to submarines or atmospheric diving suits, but it avoids complete environmental separation. Examples of this type include Conshelf III and Bentos-300. Atmospheric pressure is a critical safety concern at all times.

=== Pressure modes ===
Underwater habitats are designed to operate in two fundamental modes.

1. Open to ambient pressure via a moon pool, meaning the air pressure inside the habitat equals underwater pressure at the same level, such as SEALAB. This makes entry and exit easy as there is no physical barrier other than the moon pool water surface. Living in ambient pressure habitats is a form of saturation diving, and return to the surface will require appropriate decompression.
2. Closed to the sea by hatches, with internal air pressure less than ambient pressure and at or closer to atmospheric pressure; entry or exit to the sea requires passing through hatches and an airlock. Decompression may be necessary when entering the habitat after a dive. This would be done in the airlock.

A third or composite type has compartments of both types within the same habitat structure and connected via airlocks, such as Aquarius.

=== Components ===
Habitat
The air filled underwater structure in which the occupants live and work
Life support buoy (LSB)
The floating structure moored to the habitat which provides energy, air, fresh water, telecommunication and telemetry. The connection between Habitat and LSB is made by a multi-core umbilical cable in which all hoses and cables are combined.
Personnel transfer capsule (PTC)
Closed diving bell, a submersible decompression chamber which can be lowered to the habitat to transfer aquanauts back to the surface under pressure, where they can be transferred while still under pressure to a decompression chamber on the support vessel for safer decompression.
Deck decompression chamber (DDC)
A decompression chamber on the support vessel.
Diving support vessel (DSV)
Surface vessel used in support of diving operations
Shore base station
A shore establishment where operations can be monitored. It may include a diving control base, workshops and accommodation.

=== Excursions ===
An excursion is a visit to the environment outside the habitat. Diving excursions can be done on scuba or umbilical supply, and are limited upwards by decompression obligations while on the excursion, and downwards by decompression obligations while returning from the excursion.

Open circuit or rebreather scuba have the advantage of mobility, but it is critical to the safety of a saturation diver to be able to get back to the habitat, as surfacing directly from saturation is likely to cause severe and probably fatal decompression sickness. For this reason, in most of the programs, signs and guide lines are installed around the habitat in order to prevent divers from getting lost.

Umbilicals or airline hoses are safer, as the breathing gas supply is unlimited, and the hose is a guideline back to the habitat, but they restrict freedom of movement and can become tangled.

The horizontal extent of excursions is limited by the scuba air supply or the length of the umbilical. The distance above and below the level of the habitat are also limited and depend on the depth of the habitat and the associated saturation of the divers. The volume of the underwater environment available for excursions thus takes the shape of a vertical axis cylinder centred on the habitat.

As an example, in the Tektite I program, the habitat was located at a depth of 13.1 metres (43 ft). Excursions were limited vertically to a depth of 6.7 metres (22 ft) (6.4 m above the habitat) and 25.9 metres (85 ft) (12.8 m below the habitat level) and were horizontally limited to a distance of 549 metres (1,801 ft) from the Habitat.

== History ==
The history of underwater habitats follows on from the previous development of diving bells and caissons, and as long exposure to a hyperbaric environment results in saturation of the body tissues with the ambient inert gases, it is also closely connected to the history of saturation diving. The original inspiration for the development of underwater habitats was the work of George F. Bond, who investigated the physiological and medical effects of hyperbaric saturation in the Genesis project between 1957 and 1963.

Edwin Albert Link started the Man-in-the-Sea project in 1962, which exposed divers to hyperbaric conditions underwater in a diving chamber, culminating in the first aquanaut, Robert Sténuit, spending over 24 hours at a depth of 200 feet (61 m).

Also inspired by Genesis, Jacques-Yves Cousteau conducted the first Conshelf project in France in 1962 where two divers spent a week at a depth of 10 metres (33 ft), followed in 1963 by Conshelf II at 11 metres (36 ft) for a month and 25 metres (82 ft) for two weeks.

In June 1964, Robert Sténuit and Jon Lindberg spent 49 hours at 126m in Link's Man-in-the-Sea II project. The habitat was an inflatable structure called SPID.

This was followed by a series of underwater habitats where people stayed for several weeks at great depths. Sealab II had a usable area of 63 square metres (680 sq ft), and was used at a depth of more than 60 metres (200 ft). Several countries built their own habitats at much the same time and mostly began experimenting in shallow waters. In Conshelf III six aquanauts lived for several weeks at a depth of 100 metres (330 ft). In Germany, the Helgoland UWL was the first habitat to be used in cold water, the Tektite stations were more spacious and technically more advanced. The most ambitious project was Sealab III, a rebuild of Sealab II, which was to be operated at 186 metres (610 ft). When one of the divers died in the preparatory phase due to human error, all similar projects of the United States Navy were terminated. Internationally, except for the La Chalupa Research Laboratory the large-scale projects were carried out, but not extended, so that the subsequent habitats were smaller and designed for shallower depths. The race for greater depths, longer missions and technical advances seemed to have come to an end.

For reasons such as lack of mobility, lack of self-sufficiency, shifting focus to space travel and transition to surface-based saturation systems, the interest in underwater habitats decreased, resulting in a noticeable decrease in major projects after 1970. In the mid eighties, the Aquarius habitat was built in the style of Sealab and Helgoland and is still in operation today.

=== Historical underwater habitats ===
==== Man-in-the-Sea I and II ====
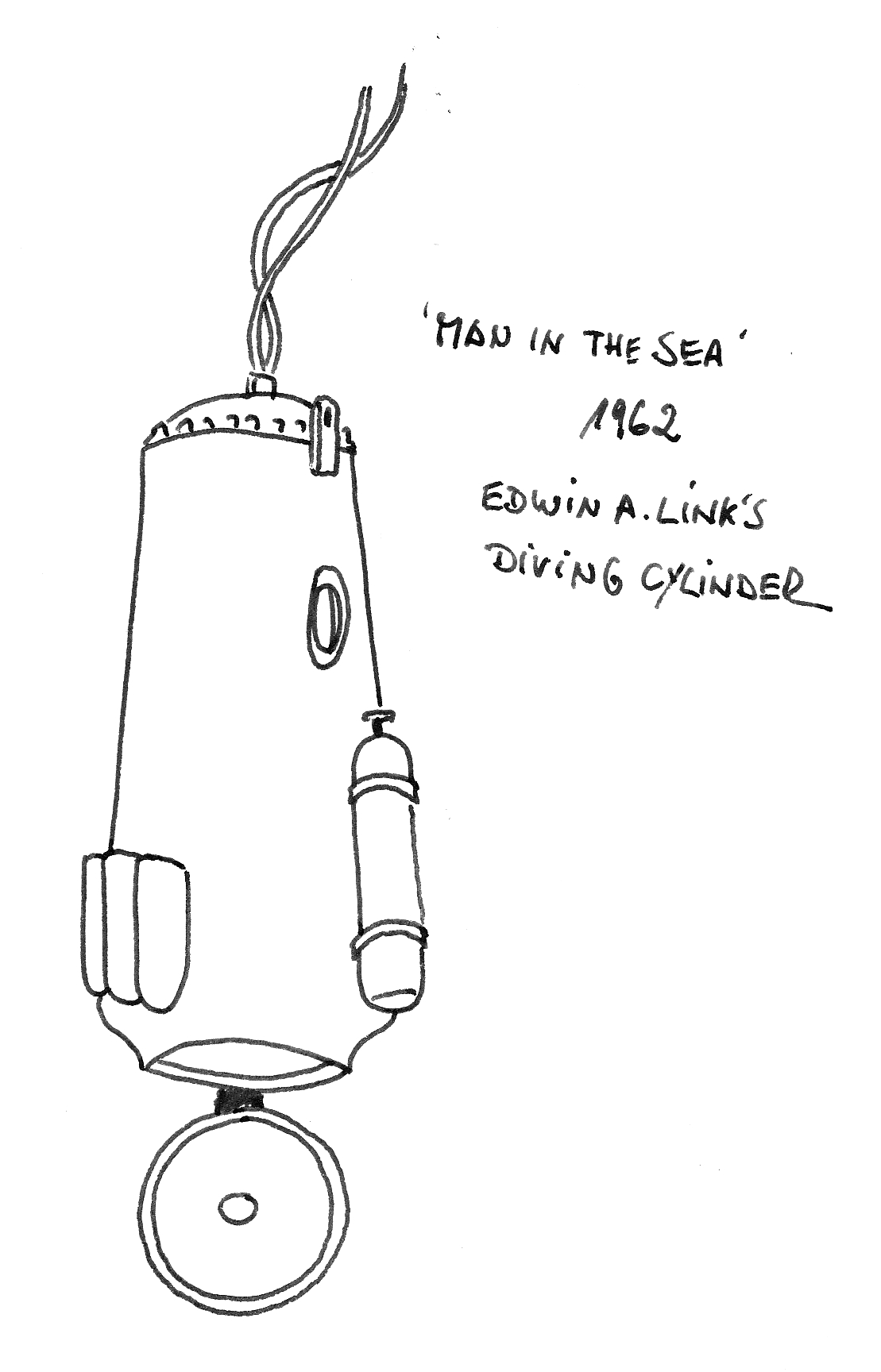
Man-in-the-Sea I – a minimal habitat

The first aquanaut was Robert Stenuit in the Man-in-the-Sea I project run by Edwin A. Link. On 6 September 1962, he spent 24 hours and 15 minutes at a depth of 61 metres (200 ft) in a steel cylinder, doing several excursions. In June 1964 Stenuit and Jon Lindbergh spent 49 hours at a depth of 126 metres (413 ft) in the Man-in-the-Sea II program. The habitat consisted of a submerged portable inflatable dwelling (SPID).

==== Conshelf I, II and III ====
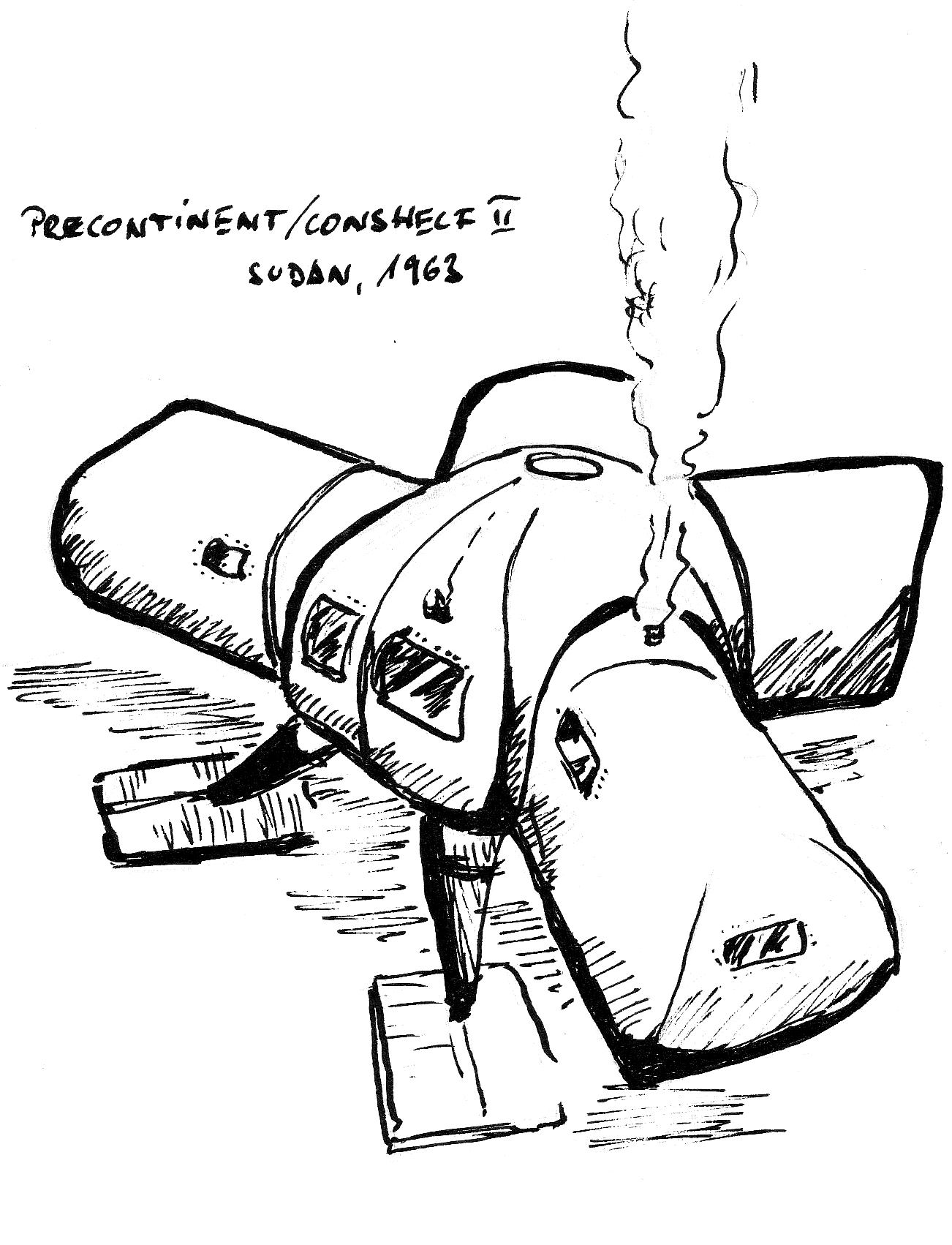
Conshelf II – Starfish

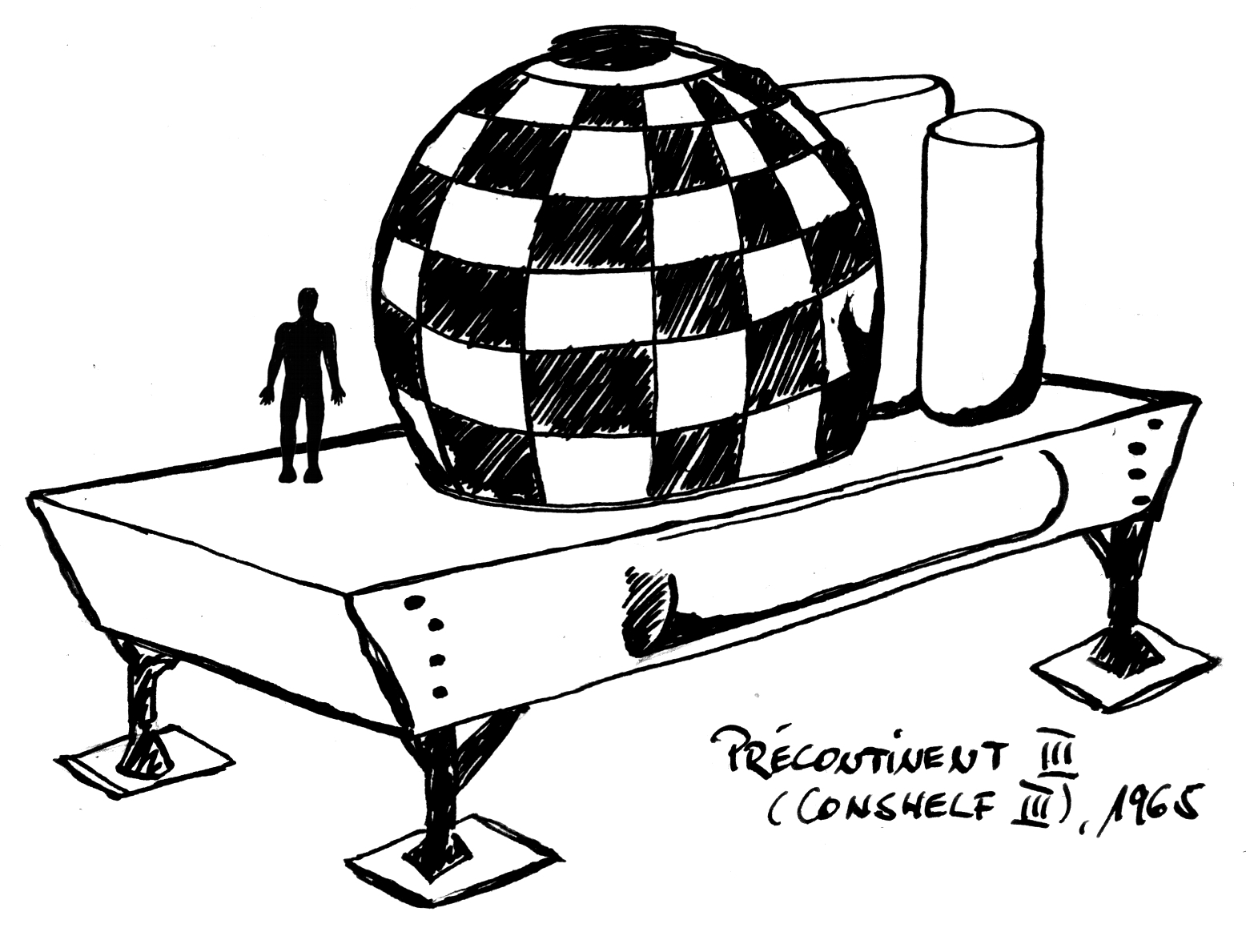
Conshelf III

Conshelf, short for Continental Shelf Station, was a series of undersea living and research stations undertaken by Jacques Cousteau's team in the 1960s. The original design was for five of these stations to be submerged to a maximum depth of 300 metres (1,000 ft) over the decade; in reality only three were completed with a maximum depth of 100 metres (330 ft). Much of the work was funded in part by the French petrochemical industry, who, along with Cousteau, hoped that such colonies could serve as base stations for the future exploitation of the sea. Such colonies did not find a productive future, however, as Cousteau later repudiated his support for such exploitation of the sea and put his efforts toward conservation. It was also found in later years that industrial tasks underwater could be more efficiently performed by undersea robot devices and men operating from the surface or from smaller lowered structures, made possible by a more advanced understanding of diving physiology. Still, these three undersea living experiments did much to advance man's knowledge of undersea technology and physiology, and were valuable as "proof of concept" constructs. They also did much to publicize oceanographic research and, ironically, usher in an age of ocean conservation through building public awareness. Along with Sealab and others, it spawned a generation of smaller, less ambitious yet longer-term undersea habitats primarily for marine research purposes.

Conshelf I (Continental Shelf Station), constructed in 1962, was the first inhabited underwater habitat. Developed by Cousteau to record basic observations of life underwater, Conshelf I was submerged in 10 metres (33 ft) of water near Marseille, and the first experiment involved a team of two spending seven days in the habitat. The two oceanauts, Albert Falco and Claude Wesly, were expected to spend at least five hours a day outside the station, and were subject to daily medical exams.

Conshelf Two, the first ambitious attempt for men to live and work on the sea floor, was launched in 1963. In it, a half-dozen oceanauts lived 10 metres (33 ft) down in the Red Sea off Sudan in a starfish-shaped house for 30 days. The undersea living experiment also had two other structures, one a submarine hangar that housed a small, two-man submarine named SP-350 Denise, often referred to as the "diving saucer" for its resemblance to a science fiction flying saucer, and a smaller "deep cabin" where two oceanauts lived at a depth of 30 metres (100 ft) for a week. They were among the first to breathe heliox, a mixture of helium and oxygen, avoiding the normal nitrogen/oxygen mixture, which, when breathed under pressure, can cause narcosis. The deep cabin was also an early effort in saturation diving, in which the aquanauts' body tissues were allowed to become totally saturated by the helium in the breathing mixture, a result of breathing the gases under pressure. The necessary decompression from saturation was accelerated by using oxygen enriched breathing gases. They suffered no apparent ill effects.

The undersea colony was supported with air, water, food, power, all essentials of life, from a large support team above. Men on the bottom performed a number of experiments intended to determine the practicality of working on the sea floor and were subjected to continual medical examinations. Conshelf II was a defining effort in the study of diving physiology and technology, and captured wide public appeal due to its dramatic "Jules Verne" look and feel. A Cousteau-produced feature film about the effort (World Without Sun) was awarded an Academy Award for Best Documentary the following year.

Conshelf III was initiated in 1965. Six divers lived in the habitat at 102.4 metres (336 ft) in the Mediterranean Sea near the Cap Ferrat lighthouse, between Nice and Monaco, for three weeks. In this effort, Cousteau was determined to make the station more self-sufficient, severing most ties with the surface. A mock oil rig was set up underwater, and divers successfully performed several industrial tasks.

==== SEALAB I, II and III ====
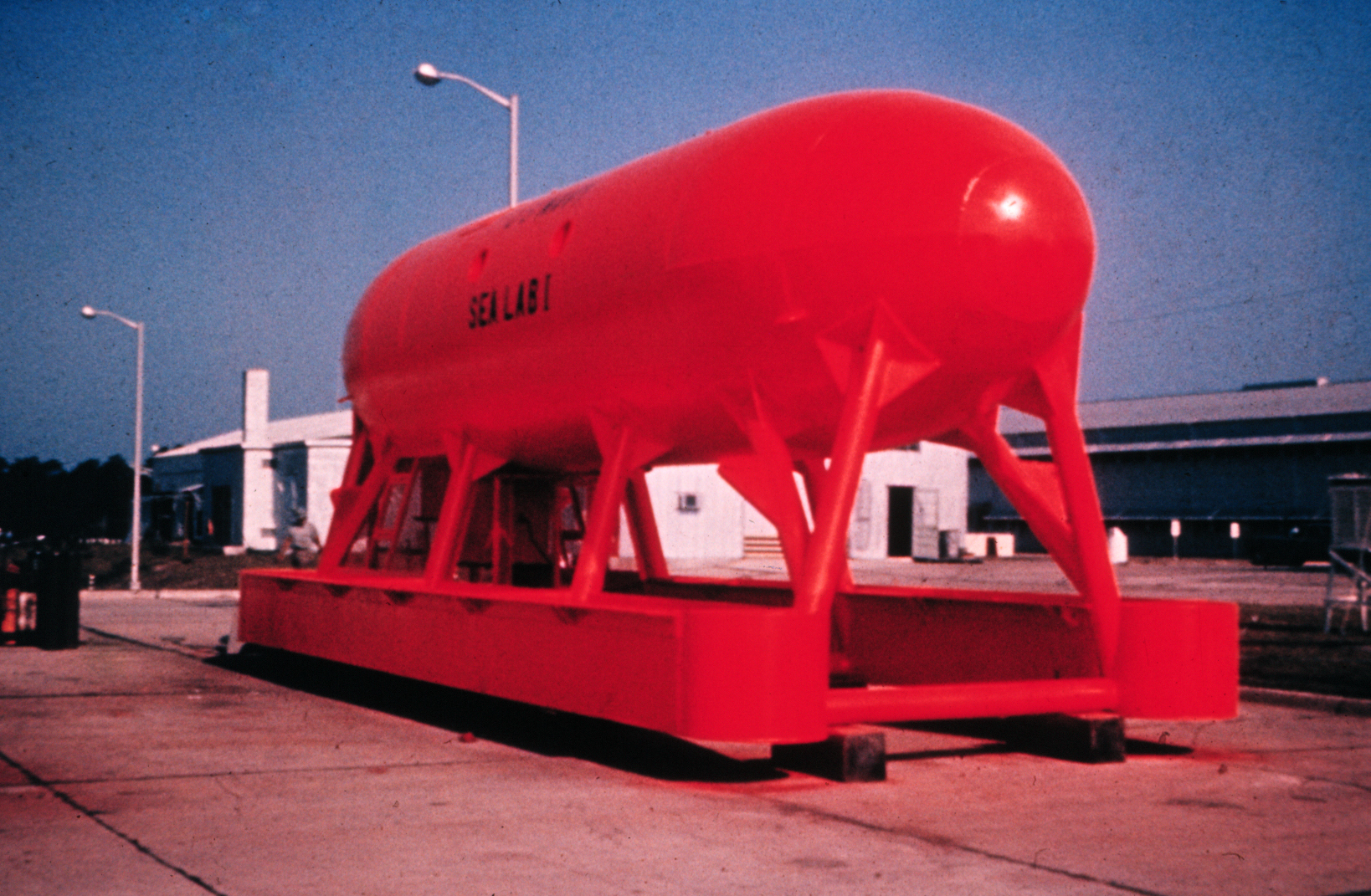
SEALAB I

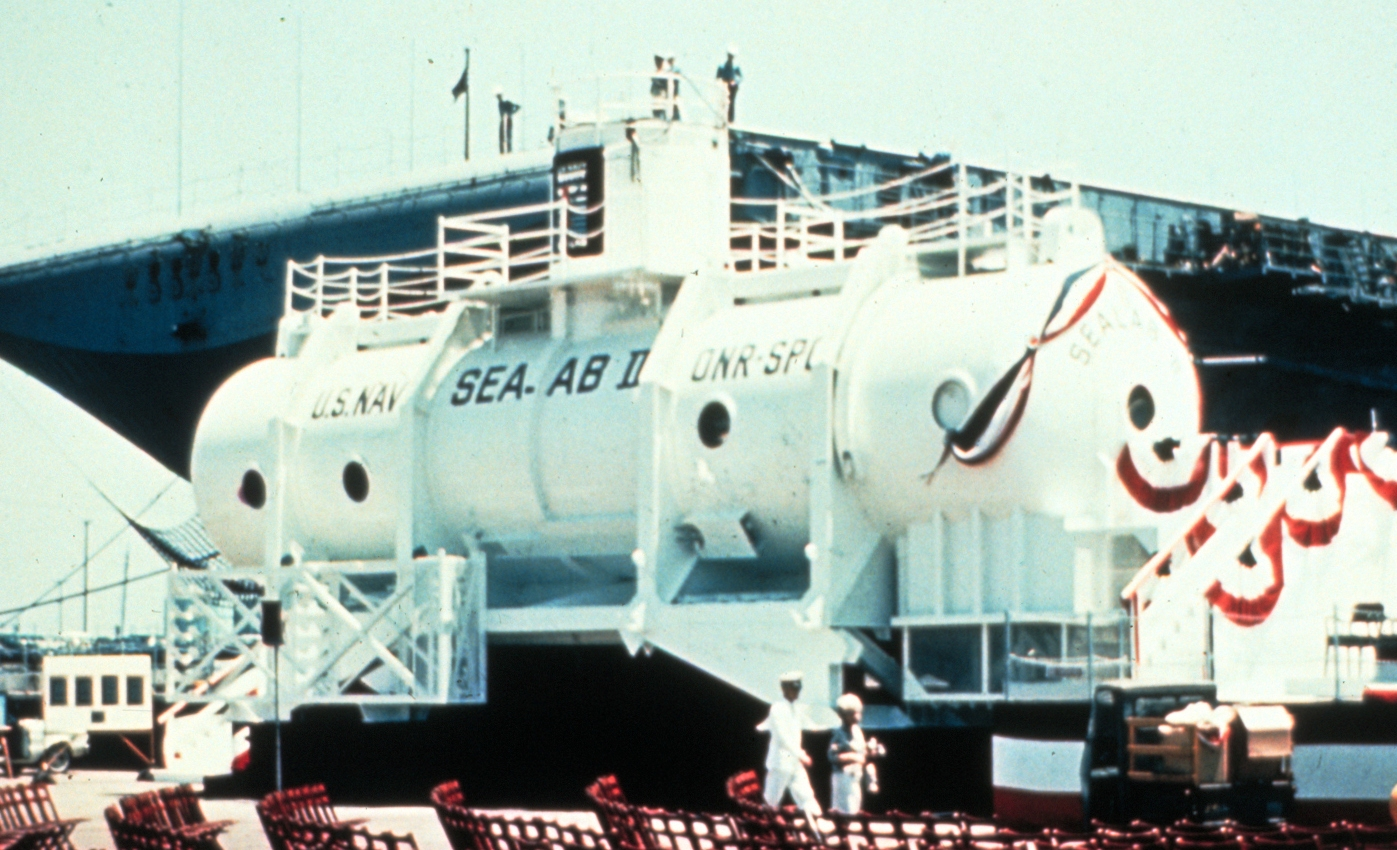
SEALAB II

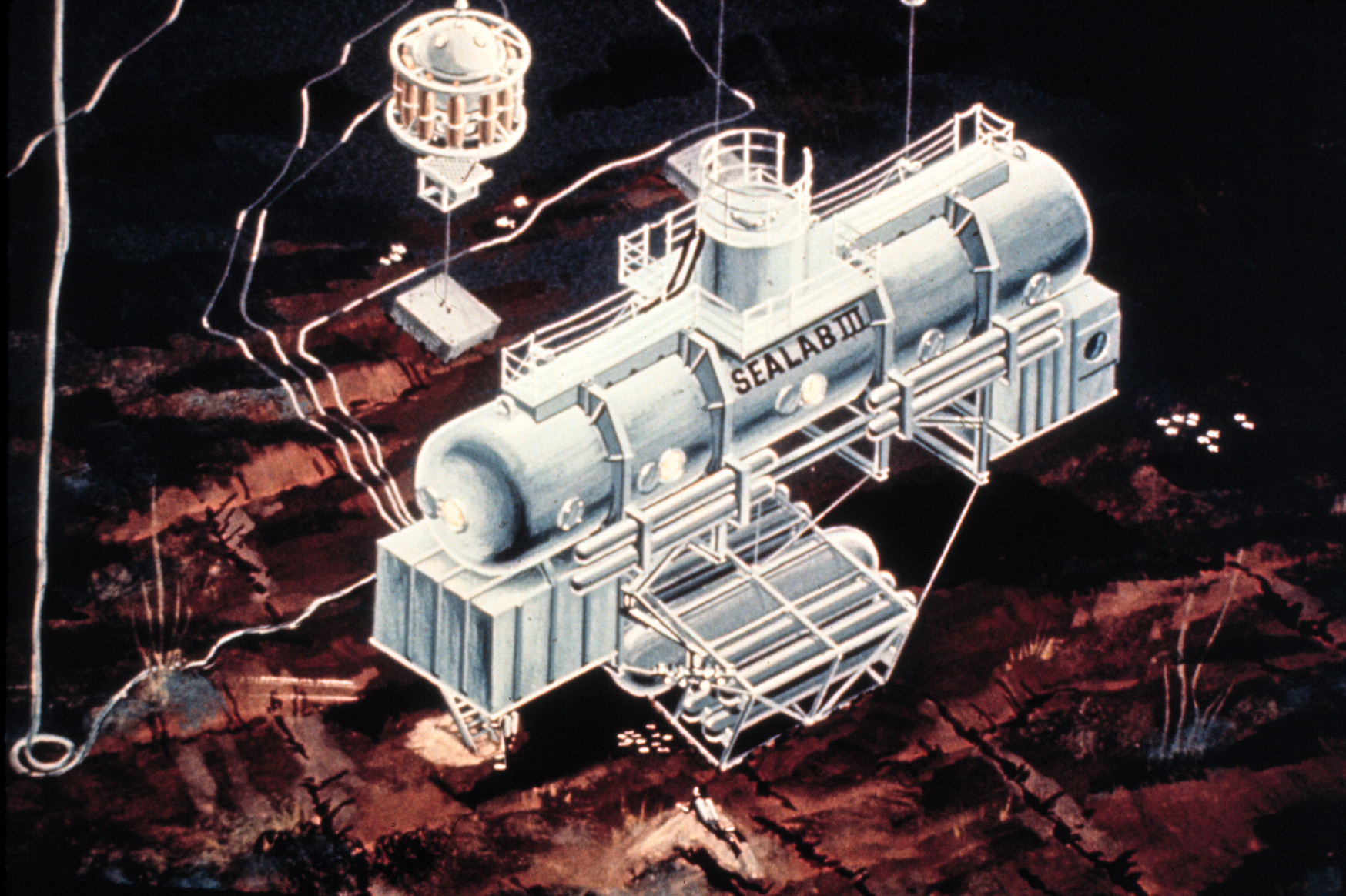
Artist's impression of SEALAB III

SEALAB I, II, and III were experimental underwater habitats developed by the United States Navy in the 1960s to prove the viability of saturation diving and humans living in isolation for extended periods of time. The knowledge gained from the SEALAB expeditions helped advance the science of deep sea diving and rescue, and contributed to the understanding of the psychological and physiological strains humans can endure. The three SEALABs were part of the United States Navy Genesis Project. Preliminary research work was undertaken by George F. Bond. Bond began investigations in 1957 to develop theories about saturation diving. Bond's team exposed rats, goats, monkeys, and human beings to various gas mixtures at different pressures. By 1963 they had collected enough data to test the first SEALAB habitat.

==== Tektite I and II ====
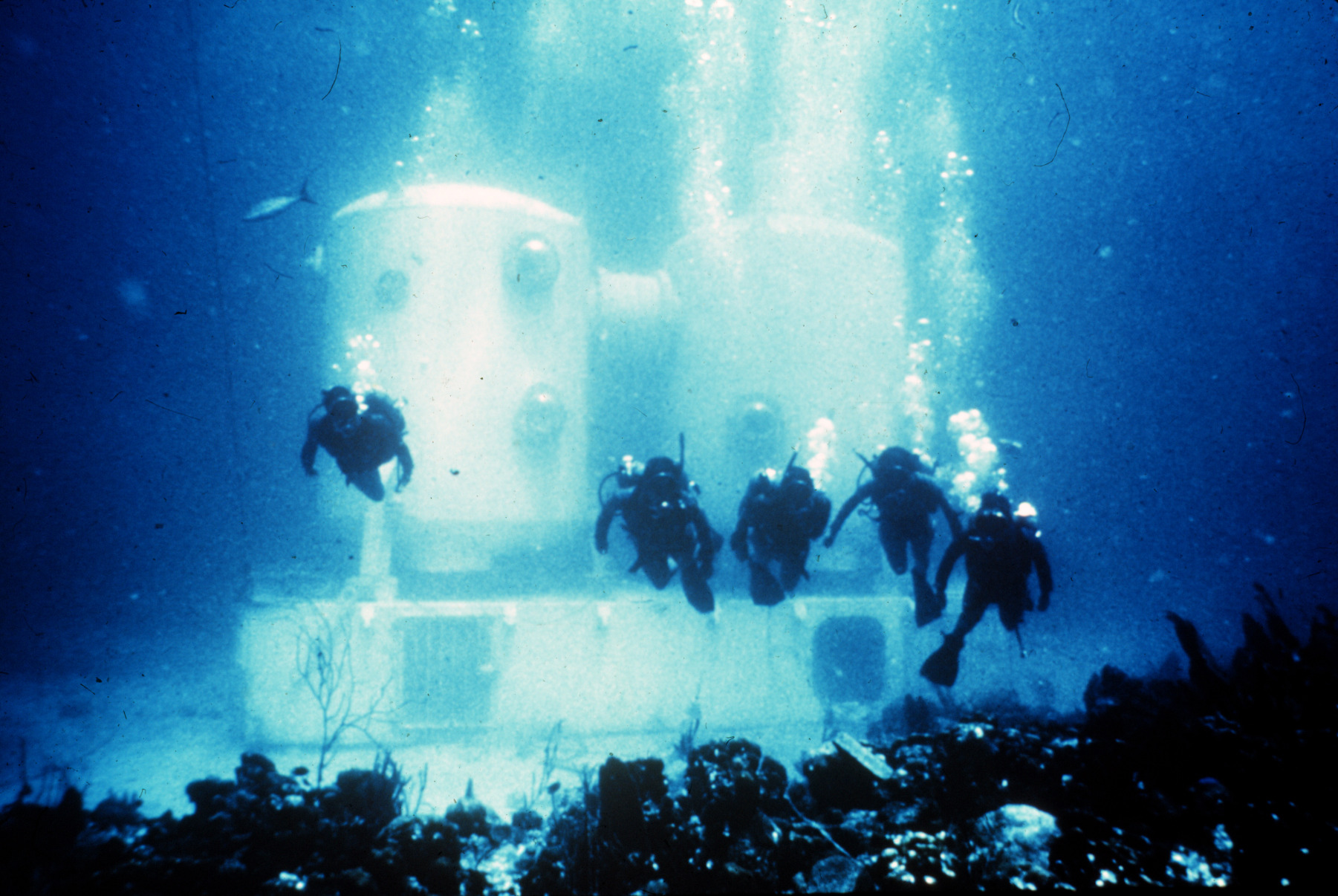
Tektite I habitat

The Tektite underwater habitat was constructed by General Electric and was funded by NASA, the Office of Naval Research and the United States Department of the Interior.

On 15 February 1969, four Department of the Interior scientists (Ed Clifton, Conrad Mahnken, Richard Waller and John VanDerwalker) descended to the ocean floor in Great Lameshur Bay in the United States Virgin Islands to begin an ambitious diving project dubbed "Tektite I". By 18 March 1969, the four aquanauts had established a new world's record for saturated diving by a single team. On 15 April 1969, the aquanaut team returned to the surface after performing 58 days of marine scientific studies. More than 19 hours of decompression were needed to safely return the team to the surface.

Inspired in part by NASA's budding Skylab program and an interest in better understanding the effectiveness of scientists working under extremely isolated living conditions, Tektite was the first saturation diving project to employ scientists rather than professional divers.

The term tektite generally refers to a class of meteorites formed by extremely rapid cooling. These include objects of celestial origins that strike the sea surface and come to rest on the bottom (note project Tektite's conceptual origins within the U.S space program).

The Tektite II missions were carried out in 1970. Tektite II comprised ten missions lasting 10 to 20 days with four scientists and an engineer on each mission. One of these missions included the first all-female aquanaut team, led by Dr. Sylvia Earle. Other scientists participating in the all-female mission included Dr. Renate True of Tulane University, as well as Ann Hartline and Alina Szmant, graduate students at Scripps Institute of Oceanography. The fifth member of the crew was Margaret Ann Lucas, a Villanova University engineering graduate, who served as Habitat Engineer. The Tektite II missions were the first to undertake in-depth ecological studies.

Tektite II included 24 hour behavioral and mission observations of each of the missions by a team of observers from the University of Texas at Austin. Selected episodic events and discussions were videotaped using cameras in the public areas of the habitat. Data about the status, location and activities of each of the 5 members of each mission was collected via key punch data cards every six minutes during each mission. This information was collated and processed by BellComm and was used for the support of papers written about the research concerning the relative predictability of behavior patterns of mission participants in constrained, dangerous conditions for extended periods of time, such as those that might be encountered in crewed spaceflight. The Tektite habitat was designed and built by General Electric Space Division at the Valley Forge Space Technology Center in King of Prussia, Pennsylvania. The Project Engineer who was responsible for the design of the habitat was Brooks Tenney, Jr. Tenney also served as the underwater Habitat Engineer on the International Mission, the last mission on the Tektite II project. The Program Manager for the Tektite projects at General Electric was Dr. Theodore Marton.

==== Hydrolab ====
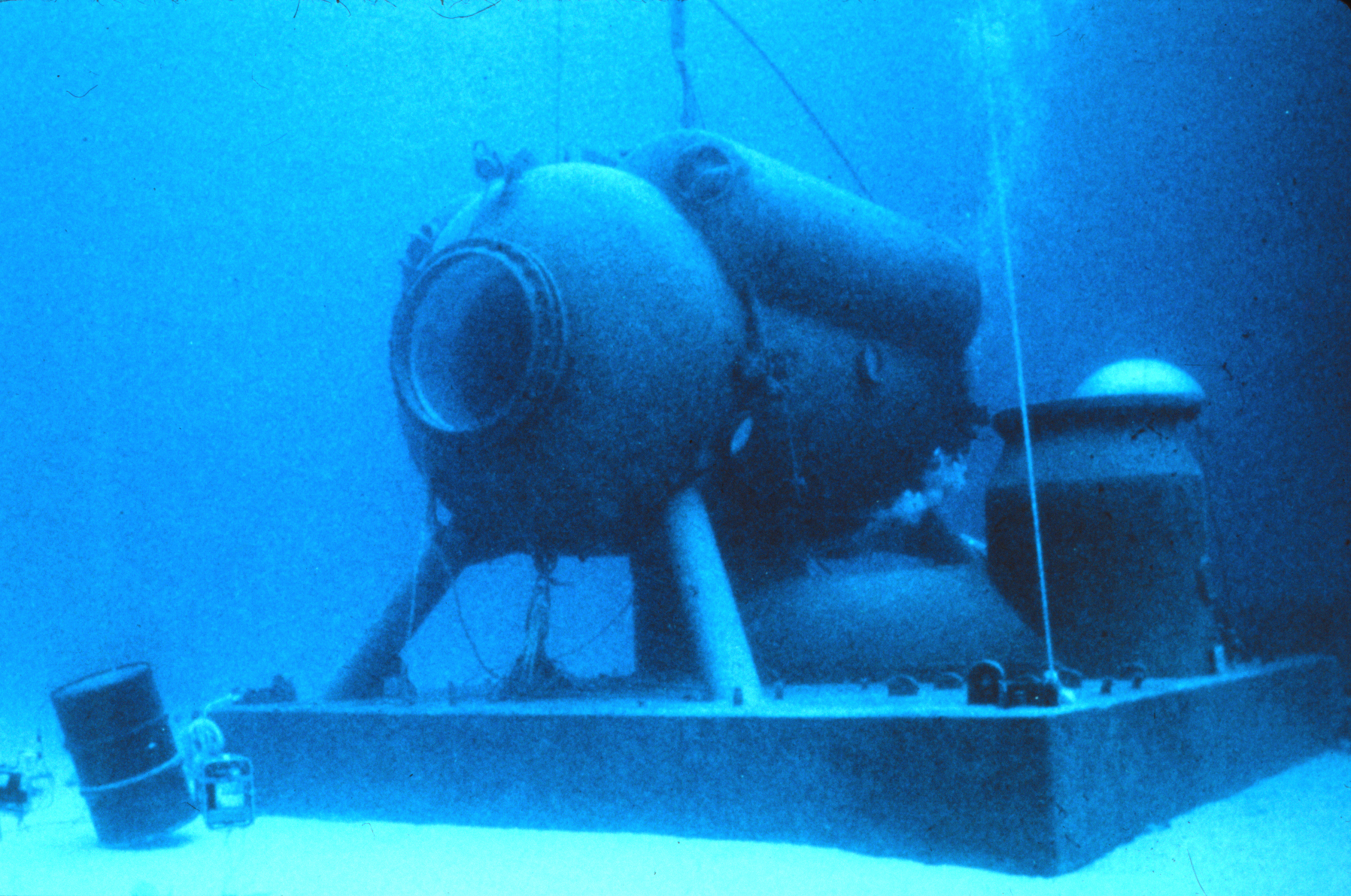
Exterior of Hydrolab

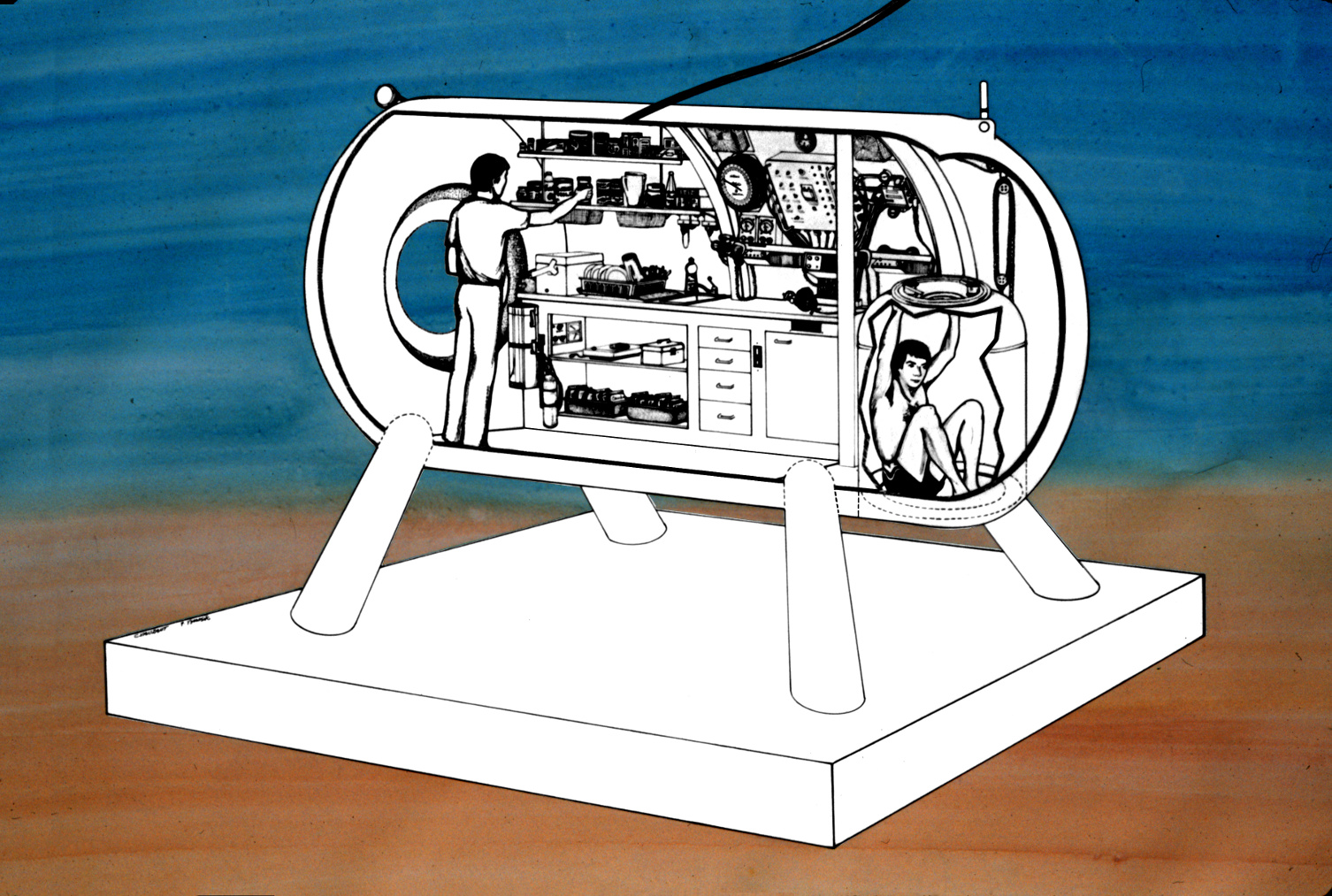
Inside Hydrolab

Hydrolab was constructed in 1966 at a cost of $60,000 ($560,000 in today's currency) and used as a research station from 1970. The project was in part funded by the National Oceanic and Atmospheric Administration (NOAA). Hydrolab could house four people. Approximately 180 Hydrolab missions were conducted—100 missions in The Bahamas during the early to mid-1970s, and 80 missions off Saint Croix, U.S. Virgin Islands, from 1977 to 1985. These scientific missions are chronicled in the Hydrolab Journal. Dr. William Fife spent 28 days in saturation, performing physiology experiments on researchers such as Dr. Sylvia Earle.

The habitat was decommissioned in 1985 and placed on display at the Smithsonian Institution's National Museum of Natural History in Washington, D.C. As of 2017, the habitat is located at the NOAA Auditorium and Science Center at National Oceanic and Atmospheric Administration (NOAA) headquarters in Silver Spring, Maryland.

==== Edalhab ====
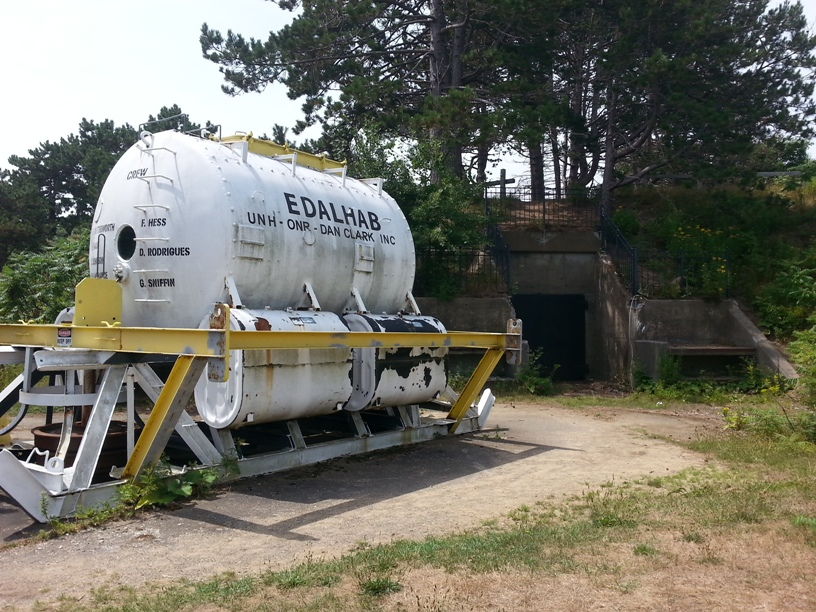
EDALHAB 01

The Engineering Design and Analysis Laboratory Habitat was a horizontal cylinder 2.6 m high, 3.3 m long and weighing 14 tonnes was built by students of the Engineering Design and Analysis Laboratory in the US at a cost of $20,000 or $187,000 in today's currency. From 26 April 1968, four students spent 48 hours and 6 minutes in this habitat in Alton Bay, New Hampshire. Two further missions followed to 12.2 m.

In the 1972 Edalhab II Florida Aquanaut Research Expedition experiments, the University of New Hampshire and NOAA used nitrox as a breathing gas. In the three FLARE missions, the habitat was positioned off Miami at a depth of 13.7 m. The conversion to this experiment increased the weight of the habitat to 23 tonnes.

==== BAH I ====
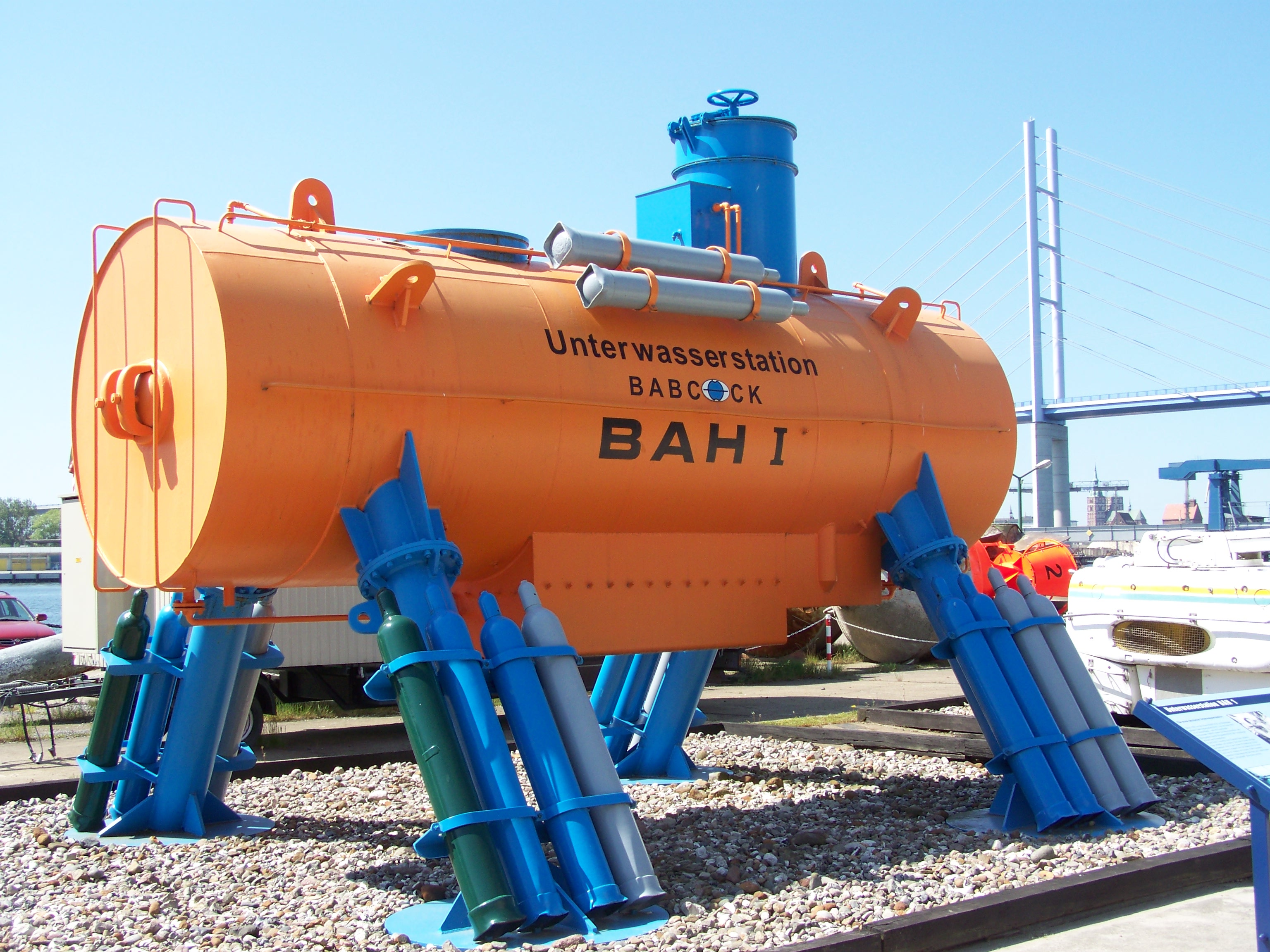
Underwater laboratory BAH-1 at the Nautineum, Stralsund

BAH I (for Biological Institute Helgoland ) had a length of 6 m and a diameter of 2 m. It weighed about 20 tons and was intended for a crew of two people. The first mission in September 1968 with Jürgen Dorschel and Gerhard Lauckner at 10 m depth in the Baltic Sea lasted 11 days. In June 1969, a one-week flat-water mission took place in Lake Constance. In attempting to anchor the habitat at 47 m, the structure was flooded with the two divers in it and sank to the seabed. It was decided to lift it with the two divers according to the necessary decompression profile and nobody was harmed. BAH I provided valuable experience for the much larger underwater laboratory Helgoland. In 2003 it was taken over as a technical monument by the Technical University of Clausthal-Zellerfeld and in the same year went on display at the Nautineum Stralsund on Kleiner Dänholm island.

==== Helgoland ====
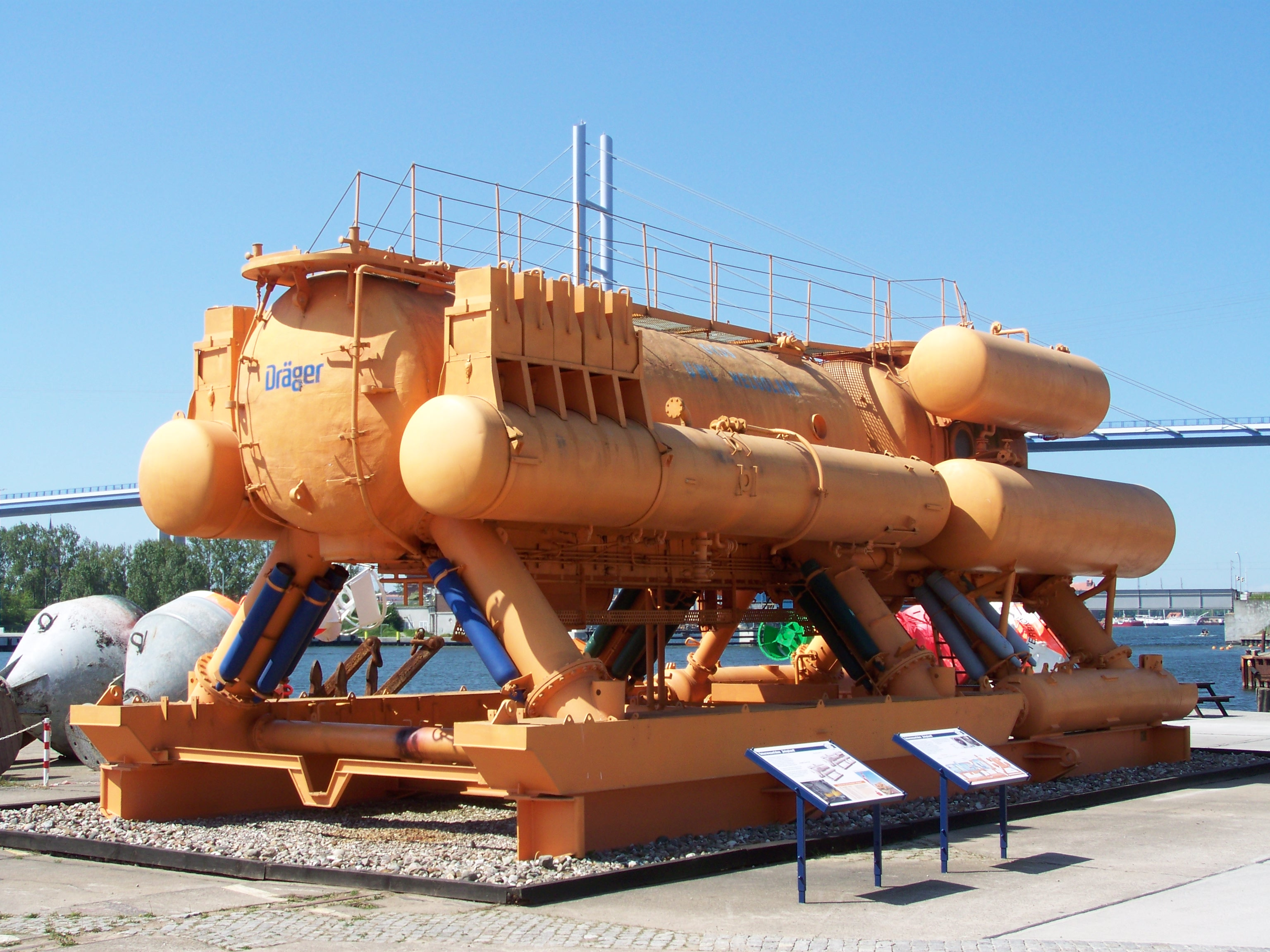
The Helgoland underwater laboratory (UWL) at Nautineum, Stralsund (Germany)

The Helgoland underwater laboratory (UWL) is an underwater habitat. It was built in Lübeck, Germany in 1968, and was the first of its kind in the world built for use in colder waters.

The 14 meter long, 7 meter diameter UWL allowed divers to spend several weeks under water using saturation diving techniques. The scientists and technicians would live and work in the laboratory, returning to it after every diving session. At the end of their stay they decompressed in the UWL, and could resurface without decompression sickness.

The UWL was used in the waters of the North and Baltic Seas and, in 1975, on Jeffreys Ledge, in the Gulf of Maine off the coast of New England in the United States. At the end of the 1970s it was decommissioned and in 1998 donated to the German Oceanographic Museum where it can be visited at the Nautineum, a branch of the museum in Stralsund.

==== Bentos-300 ====
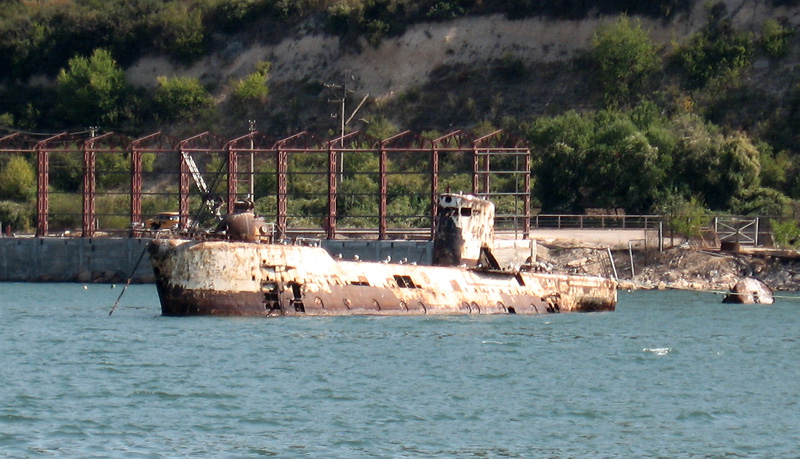
Hulk of soviet experimental submarine "Bentos-300" (project 1603) for underwater biological research

Bentos-300 (Bentos minus 300) was a maneuverable Soviet submersible with a diver lockout facility that could be stationed at the seabed. It was able to spend two weeks underwater at a maximum depth of 300m with about 25 people on board. Although announced in 1966, it had its first deployment in 1977. [1] There were two vessels in the project. After Bentos-300 sank in the Russian Black Sea port of Novorossiisk in 1992, several attempts to recover it failed. In November 2011 it was cut up and recovered for scrap in the following six months.

==== Progetto Abissi ====
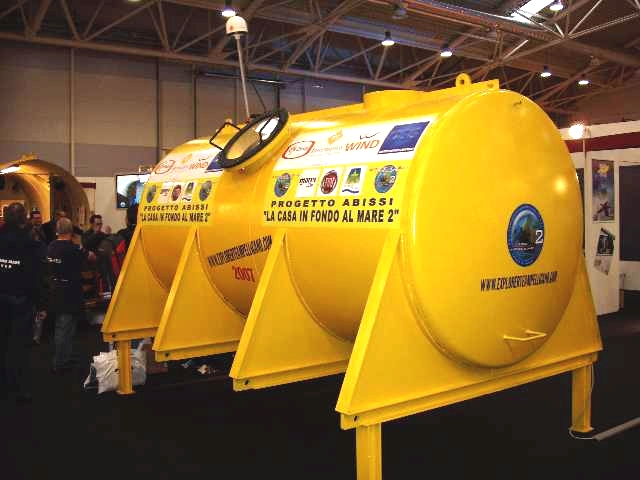
Progetto Abissi habitat

The Italian Progetto Abissi habitat, also known as La Casa in Fondo al Mare (Italian for The House at the Bottom of the Sea), was designed by the diving team Explorer Team Pellicano, consisted of three cylindrical chambers and served as a platform for a television game show. It was deployed for the first time in September 2005 for ten days, and six aquanauts lived in the complex for 14 days in 2007.

==== MarineLab ====
The MarineLab underwater laboratory was the longest serving seafloor habitat in history, having operated continuously from 1984 to 2018 under the direction of aquanaut Chris Olstad at Key Largo, Florida. The seafloor laboratory has trained hundreds of individuals in that time, featuring an extensive array of educational and scientific investigations from United States military investigations to pharmaceutical development.

Beginning with a project initiated in 1973, MarineLab, then known as Midshipman Engineered & Designed Undersea Systems Apparatus (MEDUSA), was designed and built as part of an ocean engineering student program at the United States Naval Academy under the direction of Dr. Neil T. Monney. In 1983, MEDUSA was donated to the Marine Resources Development Foundation (MRDF), and in 1984 was deployed on the seafloor in John Pennekamp Coral Reef State Park, Key Largo, Florida. The 2.4-by-4.9-metre (8 by 16 ft) shore-supported habitat supports three or four persons and is divided into a laboratory, a wet-room, and a 1.7-metre-diameter (5 ft 7 in) transparent observation sphere. From the beginning, it has been used by students for observation, research, and instruction. In 1985, it was renamed MarineLab and moved to the 9-metre-deep (30 ft) mangrove lagoon at MRDF headquarters in Key Largo at a depth of 8.3 metres (27 ft) with a hatch depth of 6 m (20 ft). The lagoon contains artifacts and wrecks placed there for education and training. From 1993 to 1995, NASA used MarineLab repeatedly to study Controlled Ecological Life Support Systems (CELLS). These education and research programs qualify MarineLab as the world's most extensively used habitat.

MarineLab was used as an integral part of the "Scott Carpenter, Man in the Sea" Program. In 2018 the habitat was retired and restored to its 1985 condition and is on display to the public at Marine Resources Development Foundation, Inc. Key Largo, Florida.

== Existing underwater habitats ==
=== Aquarius ===
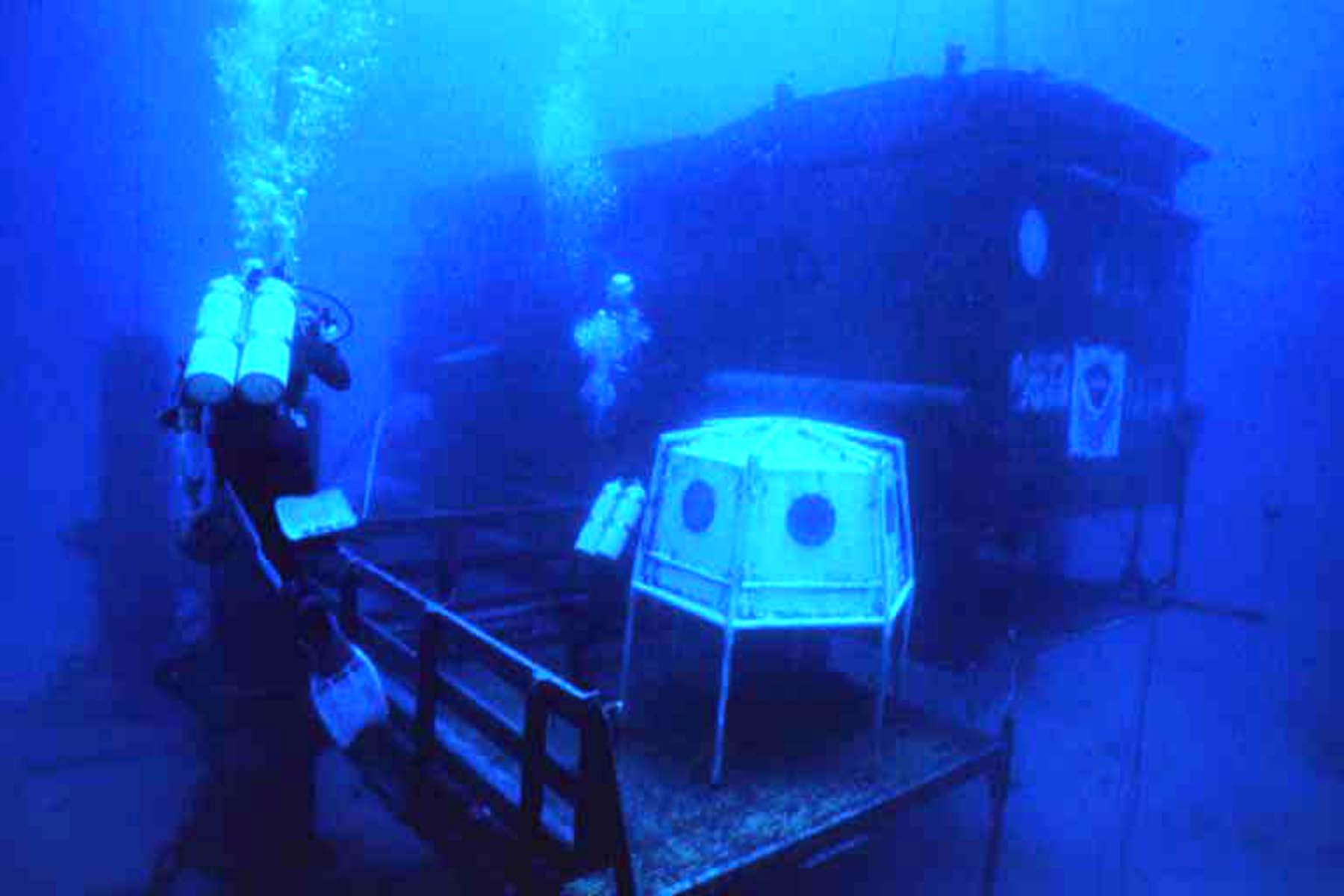
Aquarius underwater laboratory on Conch Reef, off the Florida Keys.

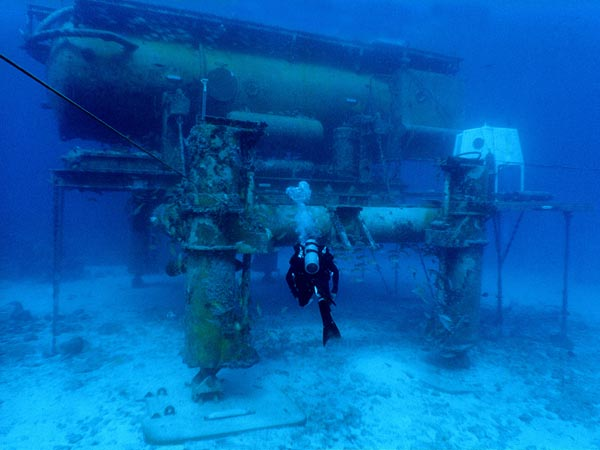
Aquarius laboratory underwater

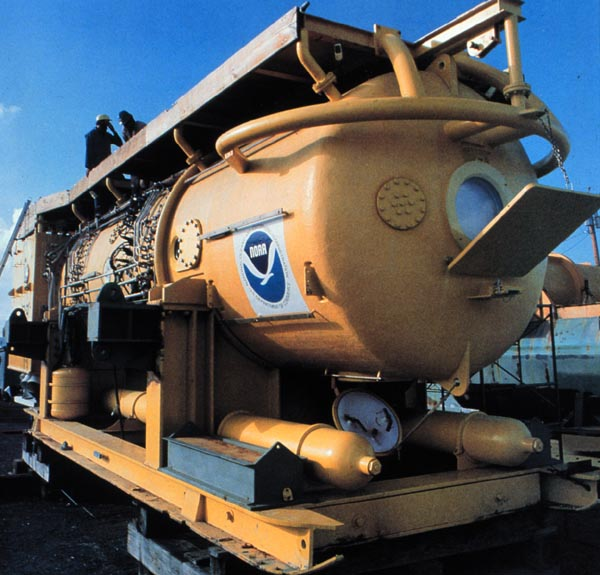
Aquarius laboratory on shore

The Aquarius Reef Base is an underwater habitat located 5.4 miles (9 kilometers) off Key Largo in the Florida Keys National Marine Sanctuary. It is deployed on the ocean floor 62 feet (19 m) below the surface and next to a deep coral reef named Conch Reef.

Aquarius is one of three undersea laboratories in the world dedicated to science and education. Two additional undersea facilities, also located in Key Largo, Florida, are owned and operated by Marine Resources Development Foundation. Aquarius was owned by the National Oceanic and Atmospheric Administration (NOAA) and operated by the University of North Carolina–Wilmington until 2013 when Florida International University assumed operational control.

Florida International University (FIU) took ownership of Aquarius in October 2014. As part of the FIU Marine Education and Research Initiative, the Medina Aquarius Program is dedicated to the study and preservation of marine ecosystems worldwide and is enhancing the scope and impact of FIU on research, educational outreach, technology development, and professional training. At the heart of the program is the Aquarius Reef Base.

=== La Chalupa research laboratory ===
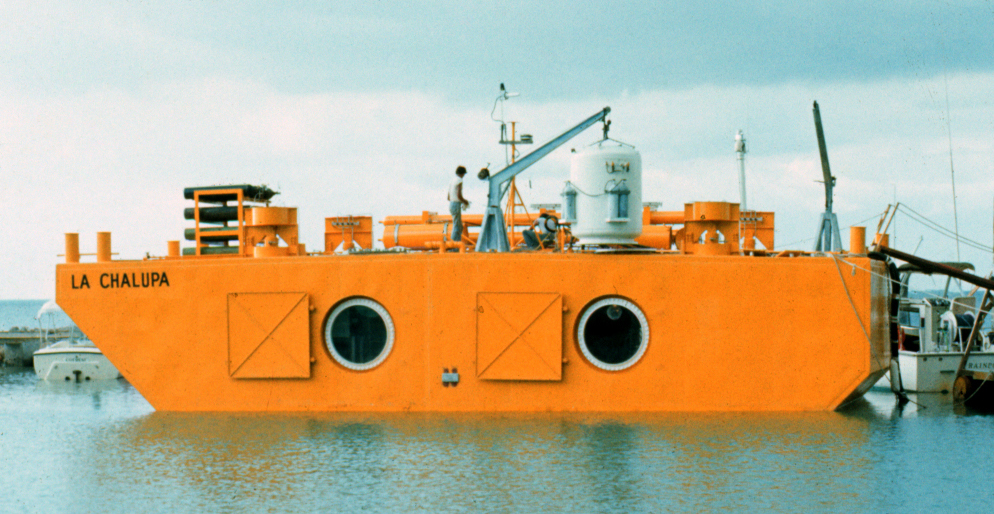
La Chalupa research laboratory, now known as Jules' Undersea Lodge

In the early 1970s, Ian Koblick, president of Marine Resources Development Foundation, developed and operated the La Chalupa research laboratory, which was the largest and most technologically advanced underwater habitat of its time. Koblick, who has continued his work as a pioneer in developing advanced undersea programs for ocean science and education, is the co-author of the book Living and Working in the Sea and is considered one of the foremost authorities on undersea habitation.

La Chalupa was operated off Puerto Rico. During the habitat's launching for its second mission, a steel cable wrapped around Dr. Lance Rennka's left wrist, shattering his arm, which he subsequently lost to gas gangrene.

In the mid-1980s La Chalupa was transformed into Jules' Undersea Lodge in Key Largo, Florida. Jules' co-developer, Dr. Neil Monney, formerly served as Professor and Director of Ocean Engineering at the U.S. Naval Academy, and has extensive experience as a research scientist, aquanaut and designer of underwater habitats.

La Chalupa was used as the primary platform for the Scott Carpenter Man in the Sea Program, an underwater analog to Space Camp. Unlike Space Camp, which utilizes simulations, participants performed scientific tasks while using actual saturation diving systems. This program, envisioned by Ian Koblick and Scott Carpenter, was directed by Phillip Sharkey with operational help of Chris Olstad. Also used in the program was the MarineLab Underwater Habitat, the submersible Sea Urchin (designed and built by Phil Nuytten), and an Oceaneering Saturation Diving system consisting of an on-deck decompression chamber and a diving bell. La Chalupa was the site of the first underwater computer chat, a session hosted on GEnie's Scuba RoundTable (the first non-computing related area on GEnie) by then-director Sharkey from inside the habitat. Divers from all over the world were able to direct questions to him and to Commander Carpenter.

=== Scott Carpenter Space Analog Station ===
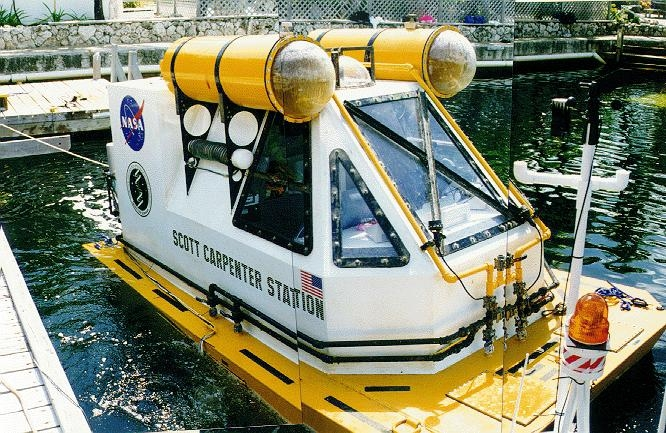
Scott Carpenter Space Analog Station

The Scott Carpenter Space Analog Station was launched near Key Largo on six-week missions in 1997 and 1998. The station was a NASA project illustrating the analogous science and engineering concepts common to both undersea and space missions. During the missions, some 20 aquanauts rotated through the undersea station including NASA scientists, engineers and director James Cameron. The SCSAS was designed by NASA engineer Dennis Chamberland.

=== Lloyd Godson's Biosub ===
Lloyd Godson's Biosub was an underwater habitat, built in 2007 for a competition by Australian Geographic. The Biosub generated its own electricity (using a bike); its own water, using the Air2Water Dragon Fly M18 system; and its own air, using algae that produce O_{2}. The algae were fed using the Cascade High School Advanced Biology Class Biocoil. The habitat shelf itself was constructed by Trygons Designs.

=== Galathée ===
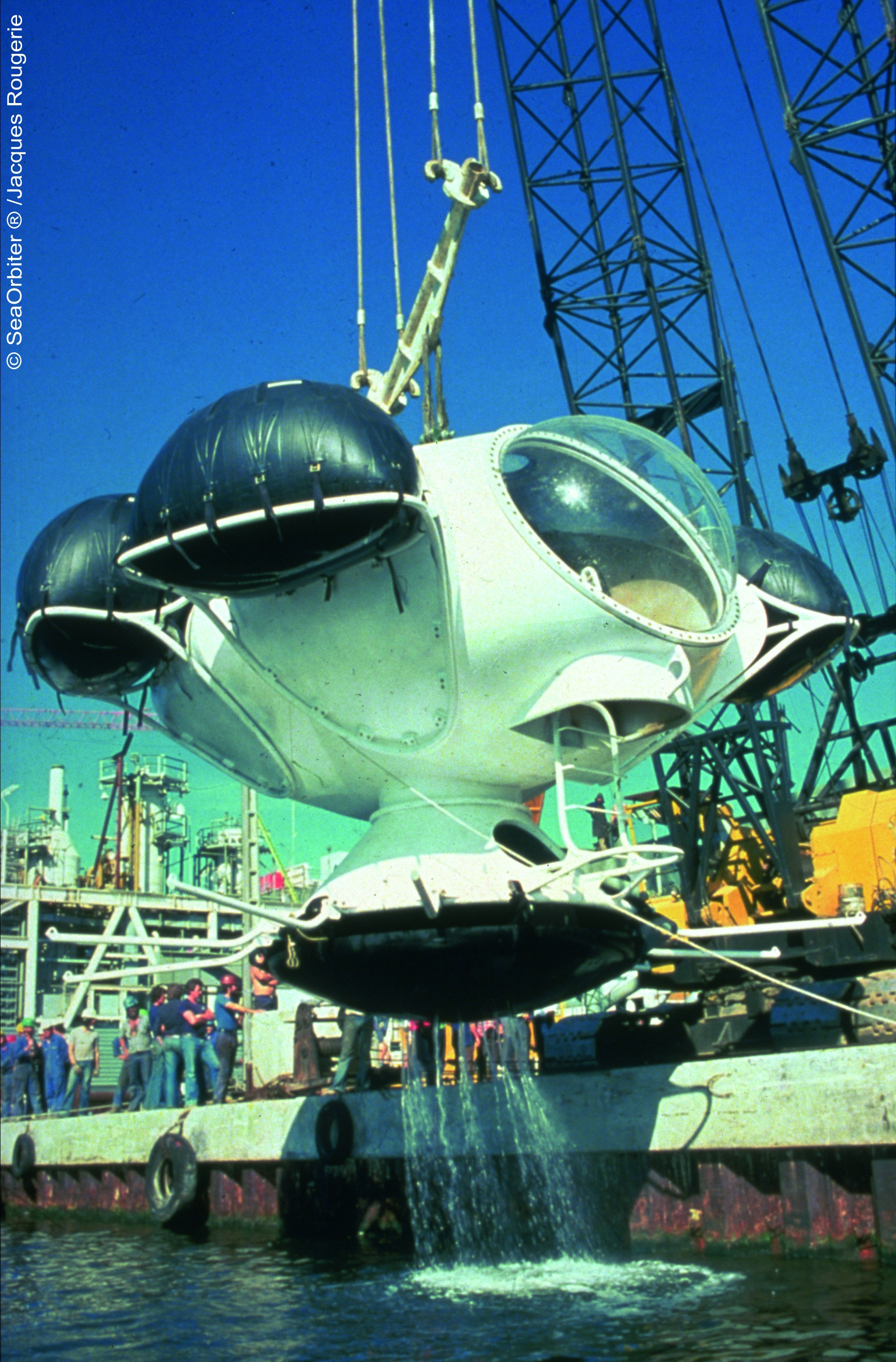
Galathée Underwater Laboratory and Habitat – 1977

The first underwater habitat built by Jacques Rougerie was launched and immersed on 4 August 1977. The unique feature of this semi-mobile habitat-laboratory is that it can be moored at any depth between 9 and 60 metres, which gives it the capability of phased integration in the marine environment. This habitat therefore has a limited impact on the marine ecosystem and is easy to position. Galathée was experienced by Jacques Rougerie himself.

=== Aquabulle ===
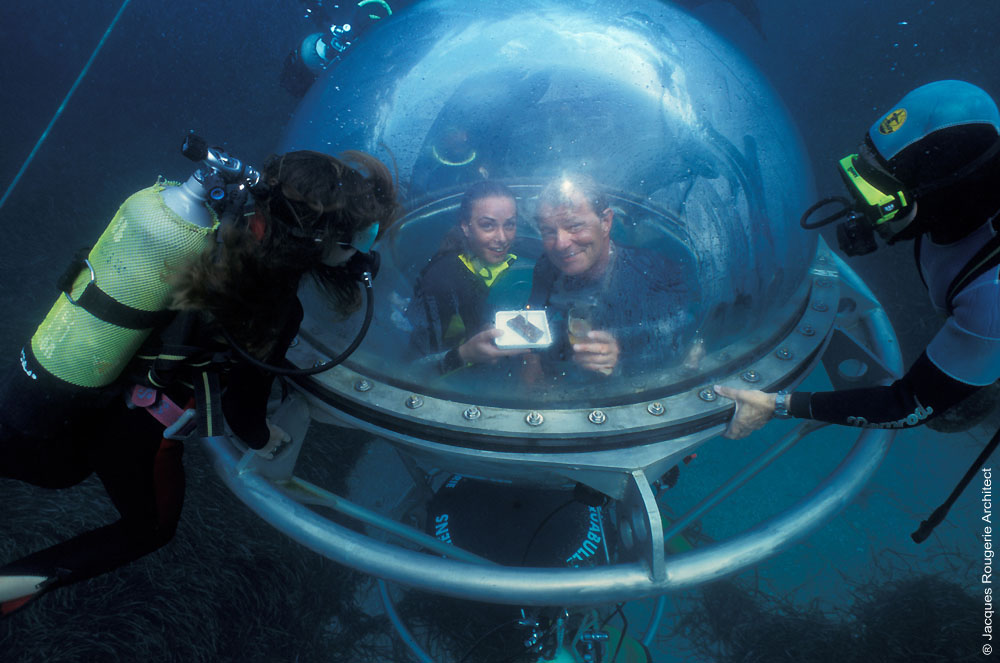
Aquabulle, Underwater Laboratory – 1978

Launched for the first time in March 1978, this underwater shelter suspended in midwater (between 0 and 60 metres) is a mini scientific observatory 2.8 metres high by 2.5 metres in diameter. The Aquabulle, created and experienced by Jacques Rougerie, can accommodate three people for a period of several hours and acts as an underwater refuge. A series of Aquabulles were later built and some are still being used by laboratories.

=== Hippocampe ===
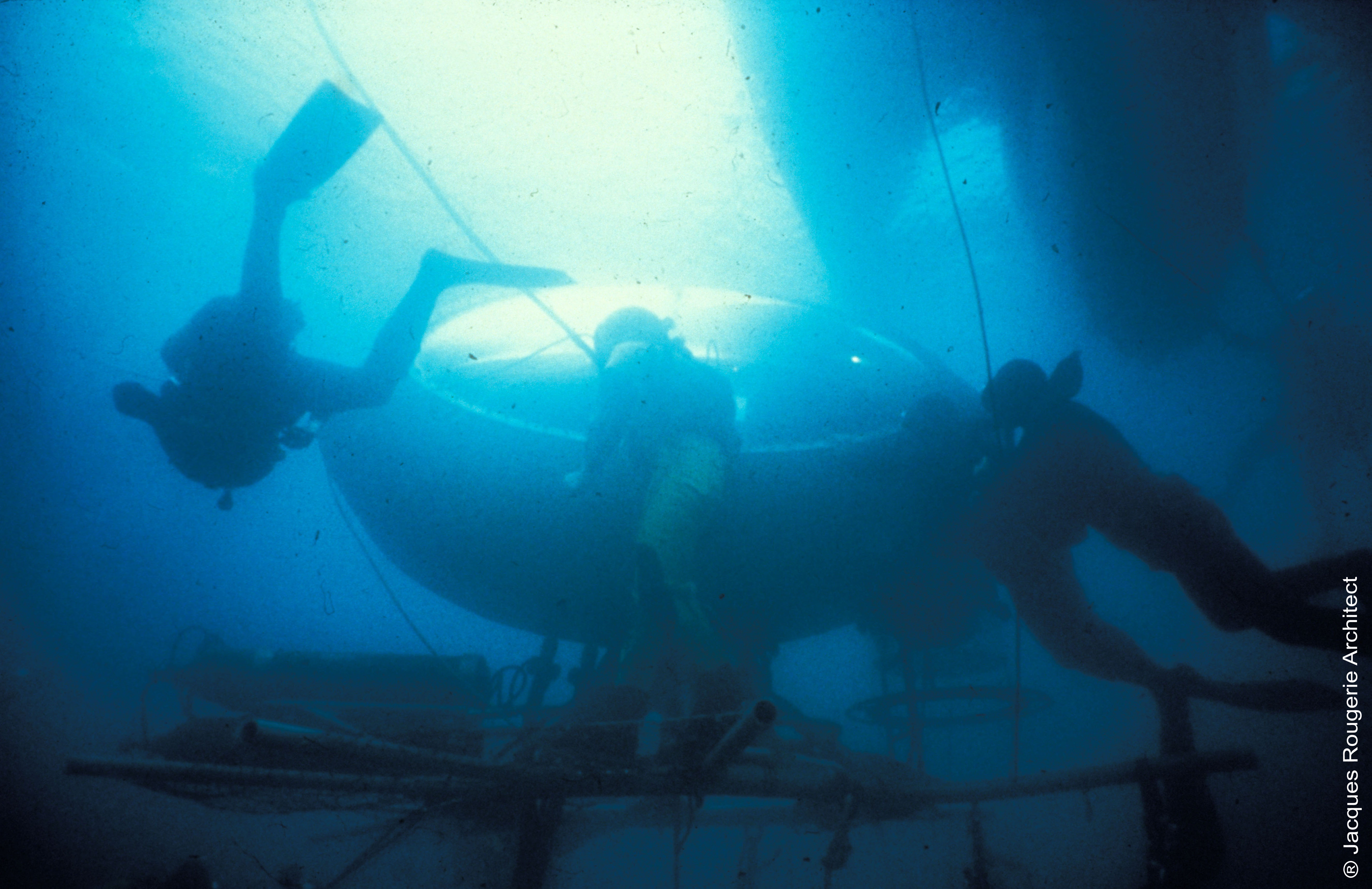
Hippocampe, Underwater Habitat – 1981

This underwater habitat, created by a French architect, Jacques Rougerie, was launched in 1981 to act as a scientific base suspended in midwater using the same method as Galathée. Hippocampe can accommodate 2 people on saturation dives up to a depth of 12 metres for periods of 7 to 15 days, and was also designed to act as a subsea logistics base for the offshore industry.

=== Ithaa undersea restaurant ===
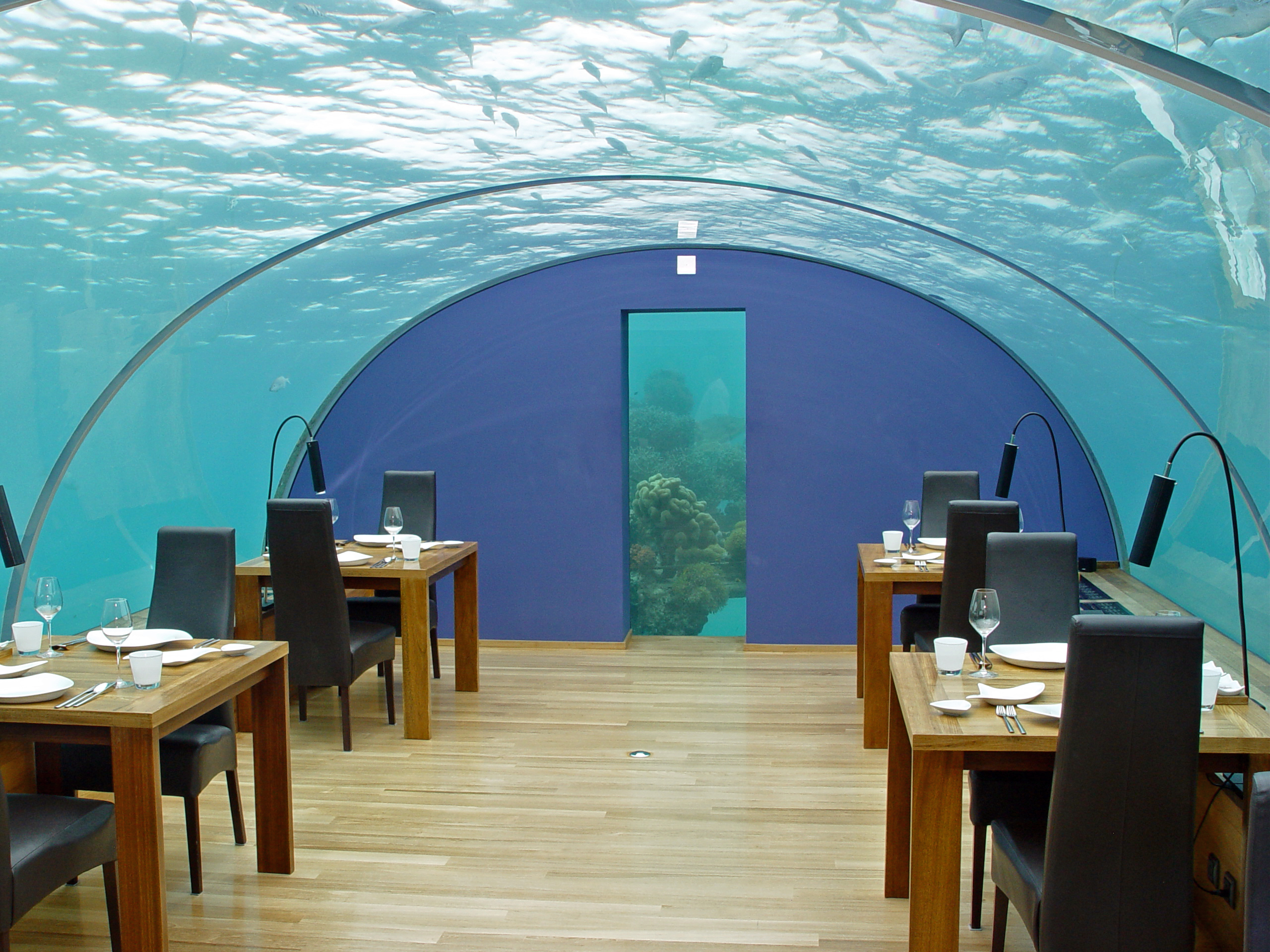
Interior of the Ithaa restaurant

Ithaa (Dhivehi for mother of pearl) is the world's only fully glazed underwater restaurant and is located in the Conrad Maldives Rangali Island hotel. It is accessible via a corridor from above the water and is open to the atmosphere, so there is no need for compression or decompression procedures. Ithaa was built by M.J. Murphy Ltd, and has an unballasted mass of 175 tonnes.

=== Red Sea Star ===
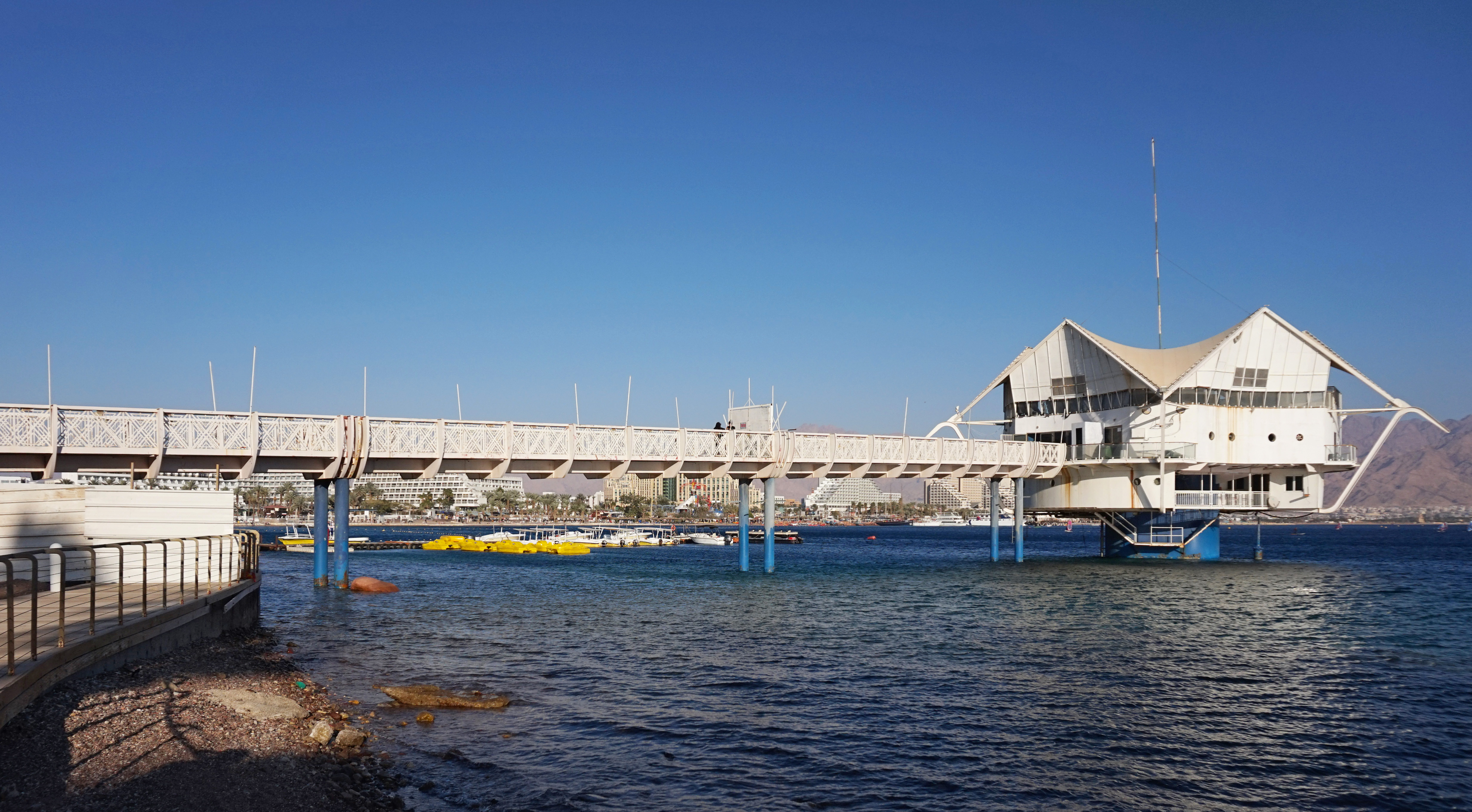
Red Sea Star in Eilat

The "Red Sea Star" restaurant in Eilat, Israel, consisted of three modules: an entrance area above the water surface, a restaurant with 62 panorama windows 6 m under water and a ballast area below. The entire construction weighs about 6000 tons. The restaurant had a capacity of 105 people. It shut down in 2012.

=== Eilat's Coral World Underwater Observatory ===
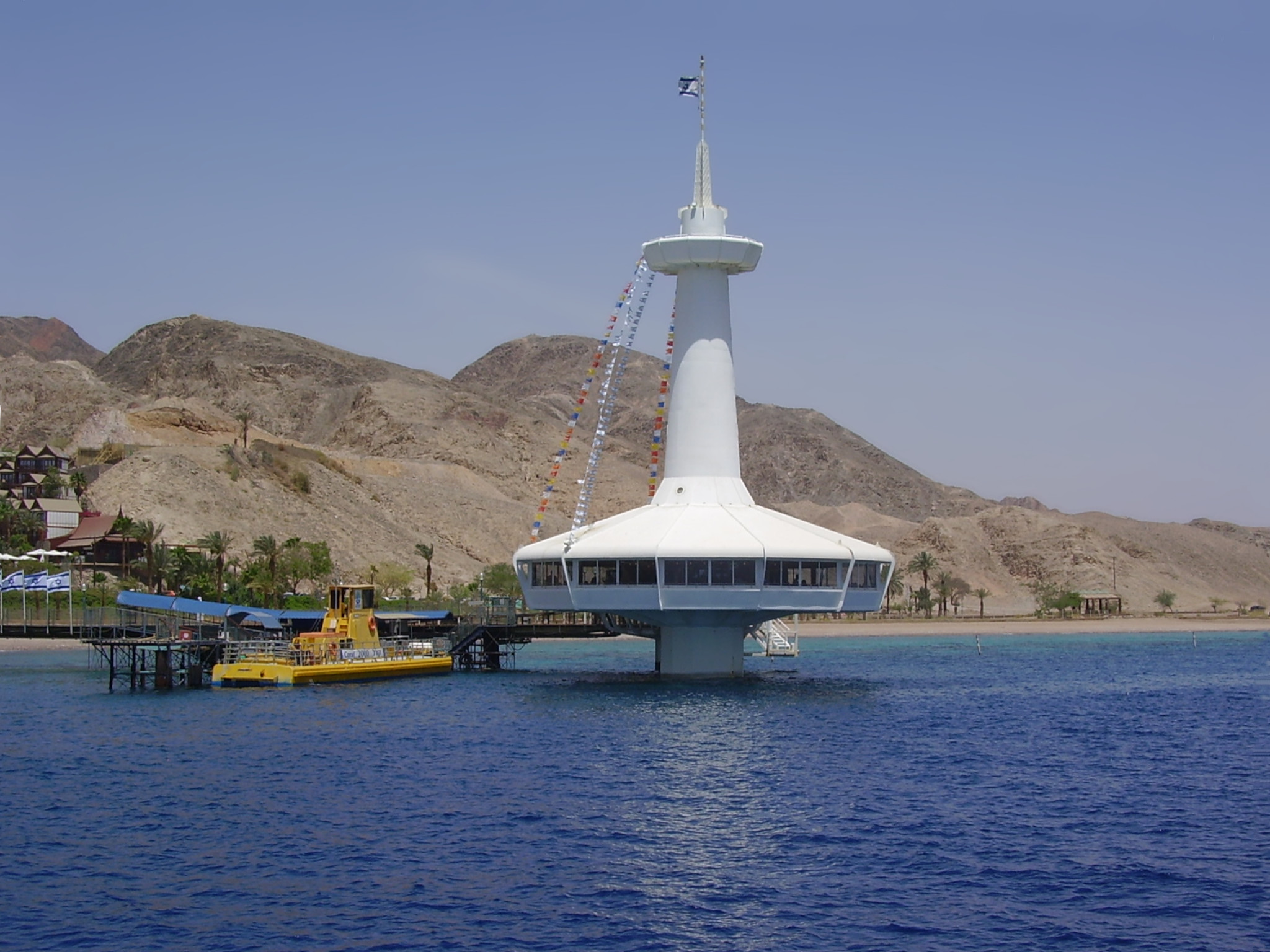
Underwater observatory in Eilat, Israel.

The first part of Eilat's Coral World Underwater Observatory was built in 1975 and it was expanded in 1991 by adding a second underwater observatory connected by a tunnel. The underwater complex is accessible via a footbridge from the shore and a shaft from above the water surface. The observation area is at a depth of approximately 12 m.

=== Alpha Deep SeaPod ===
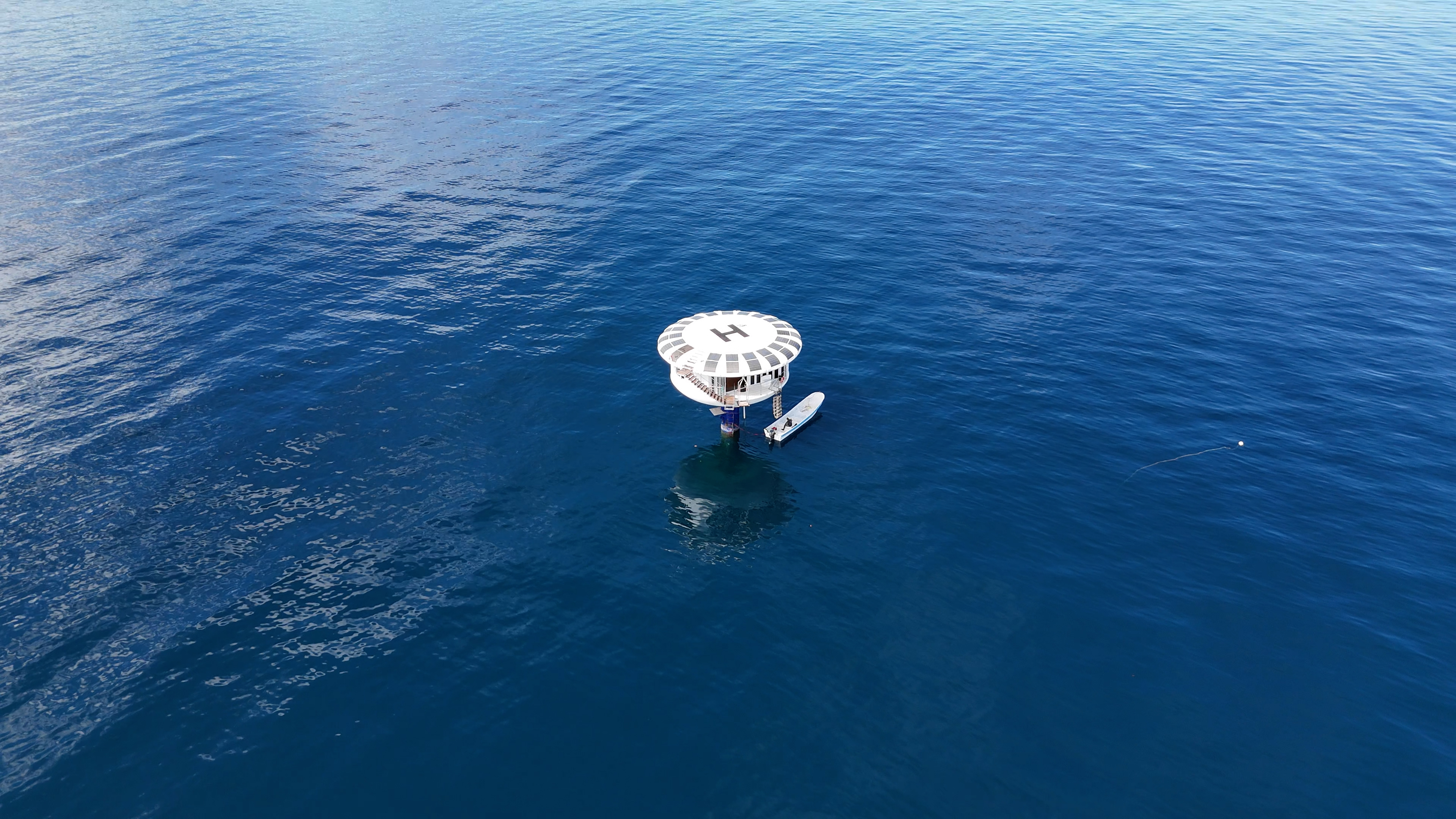
Alpha Deep SeaPod

Alpha Deep SeaPod is located off the coast of Puerto Lindo in Portobelo. The Pod was commissioned on the 5th of Feb, 2024. It is currently operational and serves as the residence of its owner. The floating residence provides living quarters with 360-degree panoramic views, while the underwater capsule serves as a 300-square-foot (about 28-square-meter) functional living space.

== See also ==
- Accommodation platform – Platform designed to provide living quarters for people
- Ichthyander Project – Soviet underwater habitat project of the 1960s
- Artificial gills (human) – Hypothetical devices to extract oxygen from water
- Saturation diving – Diving mode and decompression technique
- Human outpost – Human habitats located in environments inhospitable for humans
- Research station – Facility for scientific research
- Observatory – Location used for observing terrestrial or celestial events
- NASA Extreme Environment Mission Operations (NEEMO) – NASA Extreme Environment Mission Operation project
- Offshore construction – Installation of structures and facilities in a marine environment
- Offshore platform – Platform for offshore work, typically petroleum production
- Space station – Habitable artificial satellite
