= Jean-Frédéric de la Tour du Pin-Gouvernet =

French nobleman, general and politician

Jean-Frédéric de La Tour du Pin Gouvernet
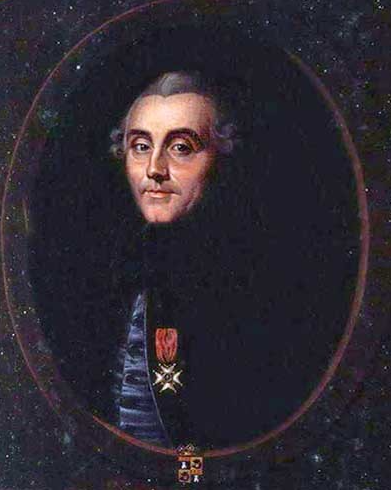
- Engraving after a painting by Jean-Baptiste Greuze

40th Secretary of State for War
- In office 4 August 1789 – 16 November 1790
- Monarch: Louis XVI
- Preceded by: Victor-François de Broglie
- Succeeded by: Louis Lebègue Duportail

Deputy to the Estates General for the Second Estate
- In office 6 May 1789 – 16 June 1789
- Constituency: Saintonge

Personal details
- Born: 22 March 1727 Grenoble, Kingdom of France
- Died: 28 April 1794 (aged 67) Paris, French Republic
- Cause of death: Guillotined

Military service
- Allegiance: Kingdom of France
- Branch/service: French Army
- Years of service: 1741–1789
- Rank: Lieutenant General
- Awards: Order of Saint Louis

Jean-Frédéric de La Tour du Pin Gouvernet, (French pronunciation: [ʒɑ̃ fʁedeʁik də la tuʁ dy pɛ̃ ɡuvɛʁnɛ]; 22 March 1727 – 28 April 1794), comte de Paulin, was a French nobleman, general and politician. After a military career that spanned over forty years, he was elected deputy to the Estates-General of 1789 for the nobility. His short political life came to an end after his nomination as the penultimate Secretary of State for War at the start of the French Revolution. A monarchist, he was sentenced to death and guillotined in 1794 alongside his elder brother Philippe-Antoine.

== Life ==
Born in Grenoble on 22 March 1727 from a noble family, he was the son of Jean de La Tour du Pin Gouvernet, comte de Paulin, and Suzanne de La Tour de La Cluse. In 1755, he married Marguerite Cécile Séraphine de Guinot, daughter of Étienne Louis Antoine de Guinot, Marquis de Monconseil, which gave him the viscounty of Ambleville.

He served as colonel of the Bourbon Regiment of Cavalry in 1741, captain in 1744, colonel of the Grenadiers de France in 1749, Chevalier de Saint Louis in 1757, colonel of the Regiment Brigadier Guien in 1761; he was appointed colonel of the Piedmont Regiment and Maréchal de camp in 1762. He was made a Lieutenant General in 1781.

In 1787, he was appointed Lieutenant General and Commander-in-Chief of the provinces of Aunis, Saintonge, Poitou and Lower Angoumois, and Lieutenant-General of the Armies of the King on 5 December 1787 and Maréchal de camp. The Comte de La Tour du Pin was appointed commander of the Provinces of Poitou and Saintonge, and then he was elected deputy to the Estates General on 26 March 1789. He represented the nobility of the sénéchaussée Saintes.

He served as Minister of War, 4 August 1789 to 16 November 1790, during the first years of the French Revolution.

He restored discipline in the army and received the congratulations of the National Assembly. Soon under political attack by the Jacobins, he offered his resignation, but the king refused to accept it. Louis XVI also recalled him in 1792 to become part of the royal government.

He defended Marie-Antoinette during her trial before the prosecutor, Fouquier-Tinville, who did not appreciate his respect for the queen.

He was guillotined in Paris on 28 April 1794, when he was sentenced at the same time as his elder brother.

== Family ==
His son Frederick Séraphin led the 43rd infantry regiment of the line, was Ambassador and Peer of France, and married Henriette Lucy Dillon, the daughter of Arthur Dillon. He was aide du camp to Gilbert du Motier, marquis de Lafayette. Henriette-Lucy is notable for her Memoirs of a Woman of Fifty Years. She is the subject of a recent biography.

His grandson, Marquis Aymar de La Tour-du-Pin, sold all of the family's land in Cubzaguais to the father of Louis Henri Hubert Delisle in 1835.

== His châteaux ==
In 1759, he began the demolition of the château of La Roche-Chalais, due to the decay of the house and the cost of repairing it.

He demolished the old Château du Bouilh in Saint Andre Bouilh Cubzac, and began construction of a new edifice in 1787, designed by the Parisian architect Victor Louis. However, before the château was completed, the Revolution broke out in 1789 and the château remains unfinished to this day. Only one large neoclassical semicircular wing was completed.

== Titles ==
His full titles were Comte de Paulin, Marquis de la Roche-Chalais et de Cénevières, Vicomte de Calvignac, Comte de Chastelard, Vicomte de Tesson et d'Ambleville, Baron de Cubzac, Seigneur du Cubzaguais, Seigneur de Formarville.
