= Château du Bouilh =

Castle in France

- Saint-André-de-Cubzac in France
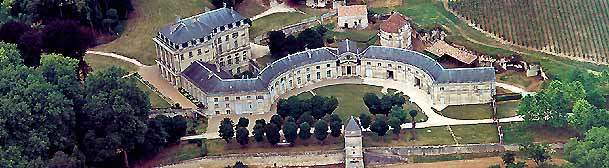
- Château du Bouilh, aerial view

Site information
- Owner: Private

Location
- Coordinates: 45°00′33″N 0°27′21″W

Site history
- Built: 1786
- Built by: Victor Louis

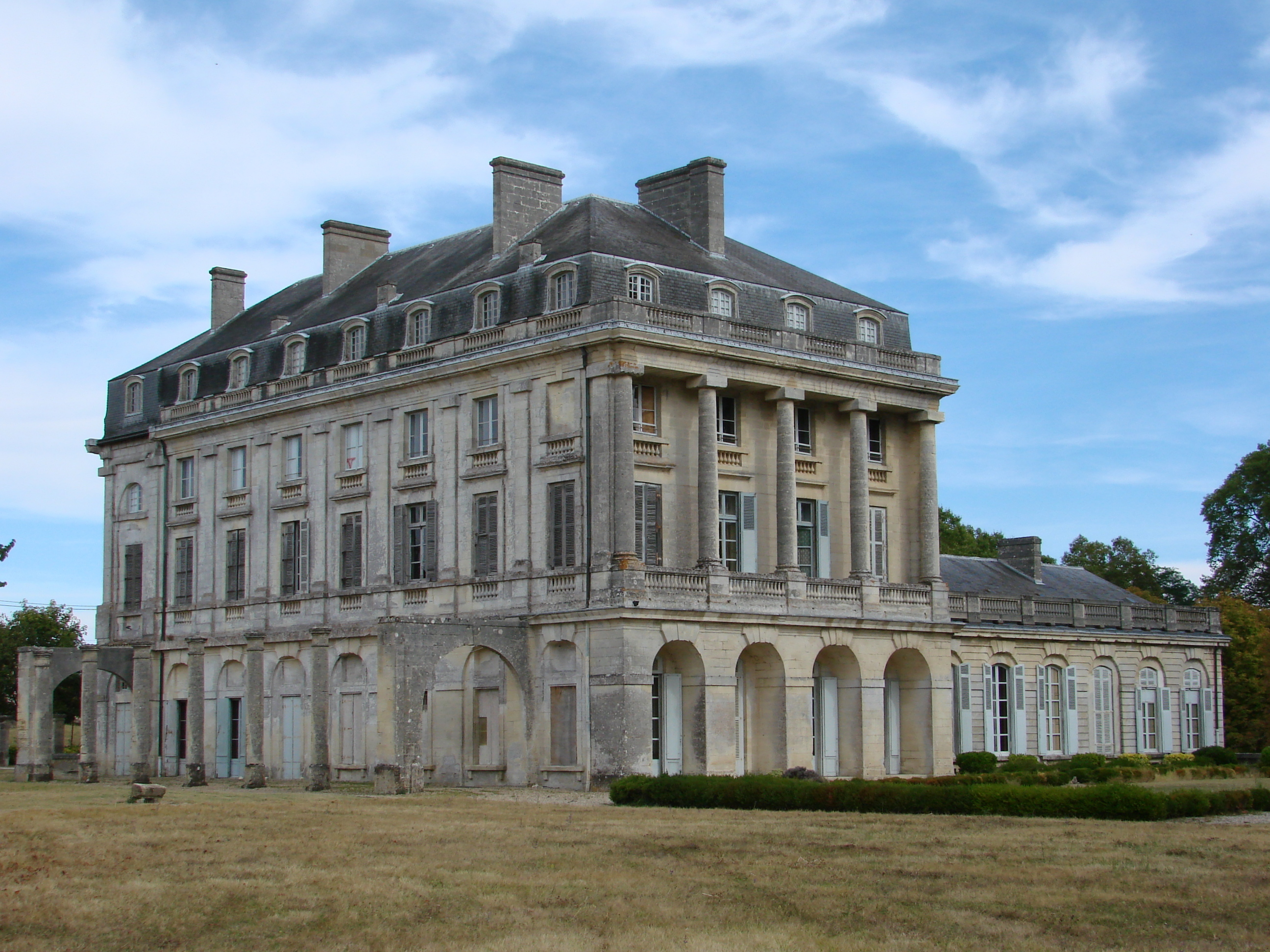
View of the château

Château du Bouilh (French pronunciation: [ʃato dy buj]) is a château located in Saint-André-de-Cubzac, Gironde, Nouvelle-Aquitaine, France. It was made in 1786 for Jean-Frédéric de la Tour du Pin-Gouvernet by architect Victor Louis. The neoclassical semicircular château was built to host King Louis XVI on his visits to the area. The castle was designated a Historical monument (France) on March 17, 1943. It opened to the public the same year.

Since 1864, it has been owned by the Feuilhade de Chauvin family.

== Origins ==
The original château was built in the 16th century by the Tour du Pin family and was the seat of the barony of Cubzac. The château was built on the site of an older noble house.

The château had few rooms: a lower room, an upper room, four bedrooms, a kitchen, and cells. It was surrounded by walls and had a drawbridge moat.

Of the original structure, only the dovecote remains. The dovecote is circular and 12 meters in diameter. The walls are hollowed out with 1,200 pigeon hutches.

== Geography ==
Located in the commune of Saint-André-de-Cubzac, the Château du Bouilh is crossed by the 45th parallel north. It is located 26 kilometers from Bordeaux and Blaye (whose citadel is a UNESCO World Heritage Site) and 29 kilometers from Saint-Émilion, also a UNESCO World Heritage Site.

== Reconstruction of the château ==
By the 18th century, the château was in a state of disrepair. The property belonged to the nobleman Jean-Frédéric de La Tour du Pin Gouvernet during the reign of Louis XVI. He was responsible for demolishing the original, medieval, château, and oversaw the construction of the modern château that more appropriately suited his status. In 1781, Jean-Frédéric was lieutenant-general of the king's armies. He invited Louis XVI to visit him in Guyenne, to which the king said "But there is no château to welcome me!" This comment spurred Jean-Frédéric to construct a new, more extravagant château on the foundations of the medieval one. Construction on the elaborate new château began in 1786 under the supervision of architect Victor Louis. However, it was halted in 1789, when Jean-Frédéric was appointed Minister of War by Louis XVI. Jean-Frédéric suspended the construction of the castle so he would not be suspected of misusing state funds during the politically turbulent lead-up to the French Revolution. The project was permanently ended in 1794 when Jean-Frédéric was guillotined for his associations with Marie Antoinette. In 1797, the château was described as in a state of abandonment. Because of the abrupt end to the construction, only two-thirds of the château designed by Louis was ever created. Louis's design comprised two main buildings on the east and west, connected by a large semicircular gallery. The western main building and the gallery were completed, but the east building was never completed, giving the château an asymmetric appearance.

== In film ==
The Château du Bouilh has served as the setting for several films, including La Maison des Rocheville in 2010, Monsieur Léon in 2006, and Cousine Bette in 1996.
