= Boudet =

Boudet is a French surname. Notable people with the surname include:

- Jacques Boudet (born 1939), French actor
- Jean Boudet (1769–1809), French general
- Henri Boudet (1837–1915), French Catholic priest
- Richard Boudet (1958–1995), French archaeologist

== See also ==
- Boudet Island, island of Antarctica
