= Marie Emmanuelle Bayon Louis =

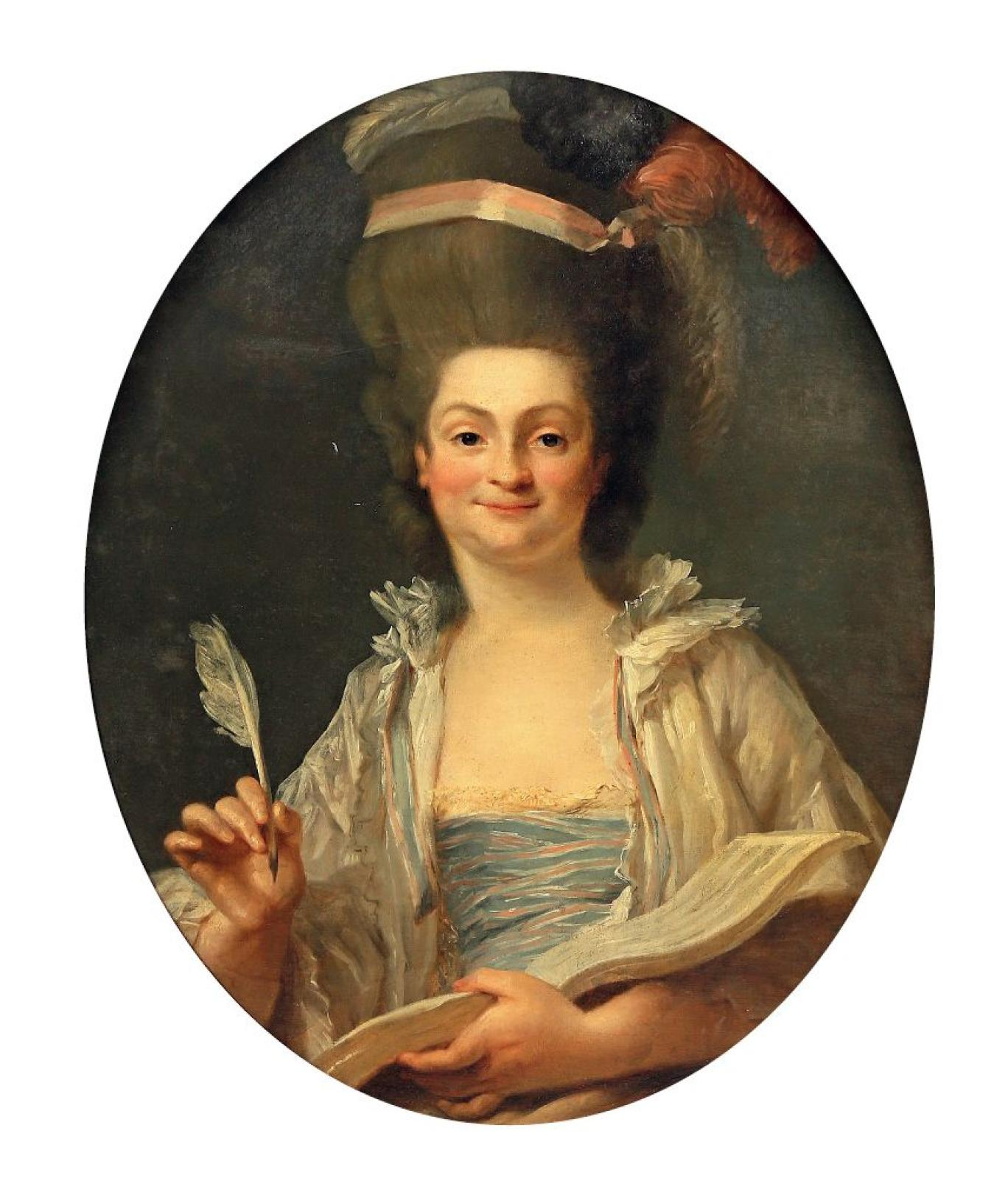
- Portrait of Madame Louis composing music, circa 1777, Paris
- Born: Myriam Feune de Colombi; June 6 1745; Marcei
- Died: March 29, 1825 (aged 79); Aubevoye
- Occupations: composer, pianist, and salonnière
- Partner: Victor Louis
- Children: Marie-Hélène-Victoire Louis

Marie-Emmanuelle Bayon Louis (6 June 1745, Marcei – 29 March 1825, Aubevoye) was a French composer, pianist, and salonnière. Contemporaries credited Mlle Bayon (or Baillon) for making the fortepiano popular in France. In 1770 she married the architect Victor Louis. Her surviving works are, as Bayon, a collection of six keyboard sonatas, three of them with violin accompaniment, opus 1 (1769), and, as Louis, the two-act opéra-comique, Fleur d’épine ("May-Flower"), first performed in 1776. Other works discussed during her lifetime include further instrumental chamber music and opéra-comiques, and music for La fête de Saint Pierre performed in 1771.

== Life ==
In her dedicatory preface to the op. 1 sonatas Bayon's reference to "the many kindnesses bestowed upon me since my tenderest infancy" by the family of Madame la Marquise de Langeron suggests that her musical training came through such patronage. From the age of about twenty-one she was associated with Madame de Genlis's salon on the rue de Grenelle. Her good friend, the encyclopedist and philosophe Denis Diderot, who hired her as music teacher for his daughter, Angélique, compared Bayon's music to that of Domenico Alberti, Johann Christian Bach, Johann Gottfried Eckard, Johann Schobert, and other foreign composers in Paris. After Bayon's marriage, the Louis residence became the site of a highly select salon. In 1774, the couple's only child was born, Marie-Hélène-Victoire Louis (d. 1848). Mme Louis wrote Fleur d’épine in 1775 and 1776. After Victor Louis died in 1800, Mme Louis remained in Paris. She died at the Louis family's country residence in the vicinity of Rouen.

== Selected published works ==
Six sonates, op.1. Paris, Vendôme, 1769 (facsimile ed., New York: Da Capo Press, 1990).
Fleur d’épine, full score. Paris, 1776. Excerpts in Women Composers: Music Through the Ages (8 vols; New York: G. K. Hall/Macmillan, 1996-ca.2006), vols. 4 (vocal numbers) and 5 (Overture).
