= Cubzac-les-Ponts =

- Commune
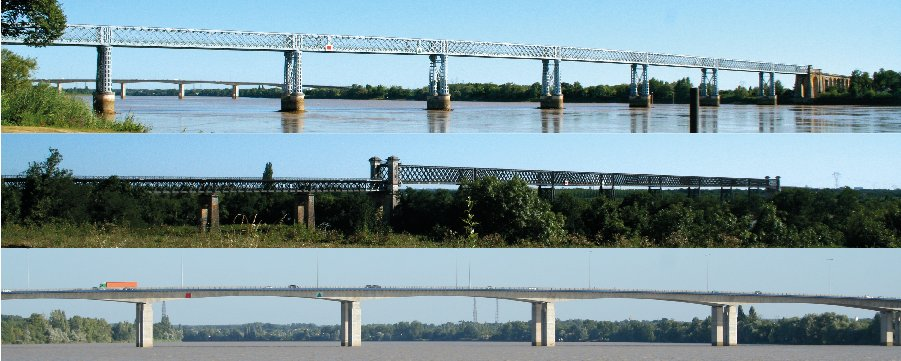
- The three bridges of Cubzac. From top: Eiffel bridge, Railway bridge, Motorway bridge

- Coat of arms
- Location of Cubzac-les-Ponts
- Location within France Location within Nouvelle-Aquitaine
- Coordinates: 44°58′17″N 0°27′10″W
- Country: France
- Region: Nouvelle-Aquitaine
- Department: Gironde
- Arrondissement: Blaye
- Canton: Le Nord-Gironde

Government
  - Mayor (2020–2026): Alain Tabone
- Area^{1}: 8.9 km^{2} (3.4 sq mi)
- Highest elevation: 42 m (138 ft)
- Lowest elevation: 1 m (3.3 ft)
- Population (2023): 2,693
  - Density: 300/km^{2} (780/sq mi)
- Time zone: UTC+01:00 (CET)
  - Summer (DST): UTC+02:00 (CEST)
- INSEE/Postal code: 33143 /33240
- Website: www.mairie-cubzaclesponts.com
- ^{1} French Land Register data, which excludes lakes, ponds, glaciers > 1 km^{2} (0.386 sq mi or 247 acres) and river estuaries.

Cubzac-les-Ponts (French pronunciation: [kybzak le pɔ̃]; Occitan: Cubzac daus Ponts), also referred to as Cubzac, is a commune of the Gironde department in Nouvelle-Aquitaine, a region in southwestern France. Located 20 km northeast of Bordeaux, it is a crossing point of the river Dordogne. Cubzac has three bridges, one designed by Gustave Eiffel.

During the Middle Ages, Cubzac served as a watchtower through the Four Sons of Amon castle. Different means of crossing the river in Cubzac have historically been used, from pontoon bridges and horse-powered ferries to steel and concrete bridges. Part of a vibrant wine region, Cubzac has several wine castles, including the Terrefort castle. It has developed its own sparkling wine, in what is now called the Café de Paris. The limestone quarries of Cubzac supplied for the typical white constructions found in Bordeaux and its region. Cubzac has two Monuments Historiques; the first is a painting in a church, the other is the ruins of the Four Sons of Amon castle.

== Geography ==
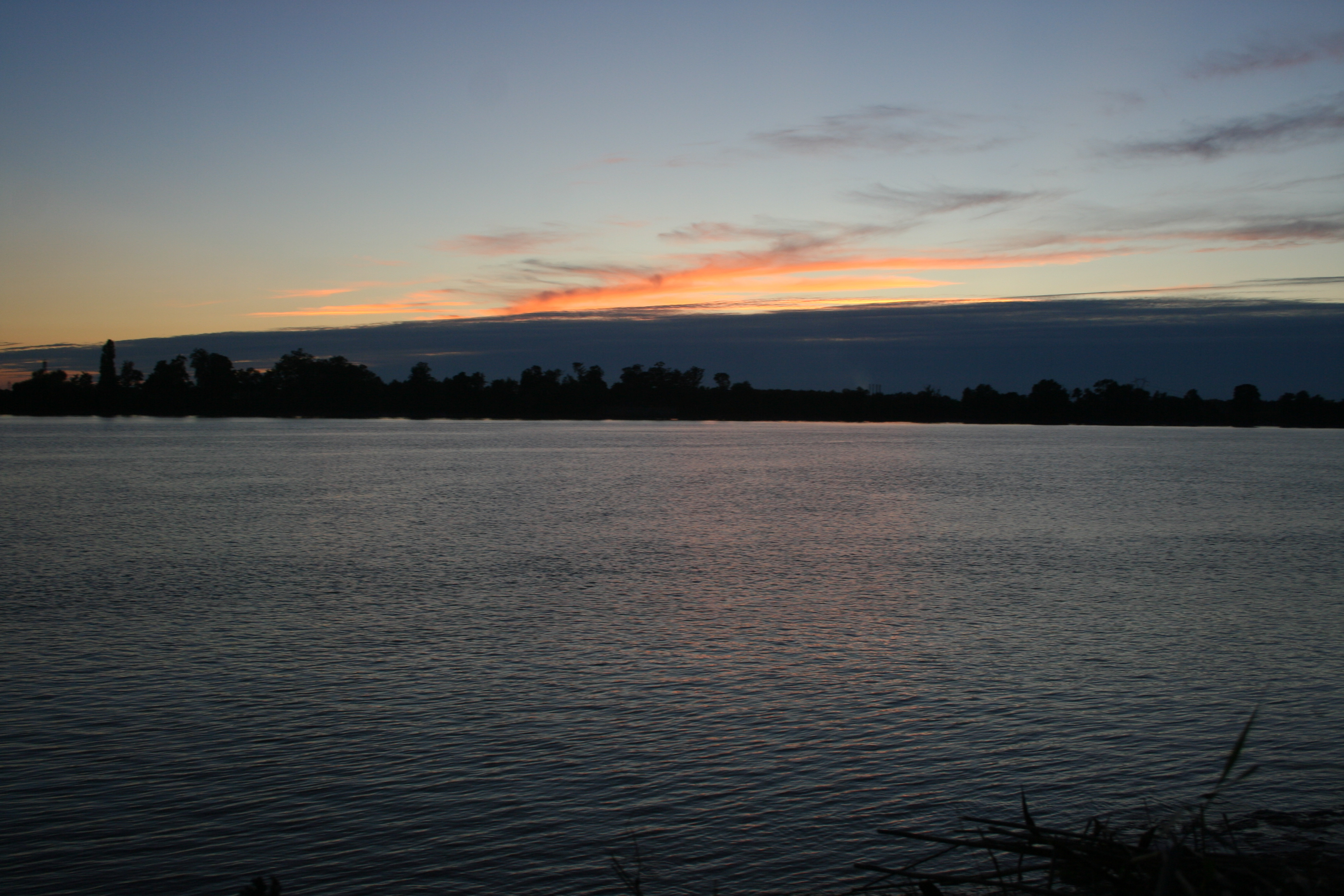
The river Dordogne is about 530 m wide near Cubzac.

Cubzac is located about 20 km northeast of Bordeaux, on the north riverbank of the Dordogne. Several transport networks converge in Cubzac to cross the river. These include the A10 motorway, the N10 trunk road and the Bordeaux-Nantes railroad. The LGV Sud-Ouest, a high-speed railway line running between Tours and Bordeaux, is in the process of being built. Cubzac has an elevation ranging from 1 m to 42 m, the highest points being limestone cliffs dating from the Oligocene epoch, some of which have been used as source of stone. In oenological terms, Cubzac is near the appellations d'origine contrôlée (AOC) côtes de Bourg and Fronsac, with its own wine castles.

== Population ==
Historical population
Year	Pop.	±% p.a.
1968	987	—
1975	1,115	+1.76%
1982	1,398	+3.28%
1990	1,701	+2.48%
1999	1,788	+0.56%
2007	1,927	+0.94%
2012	2,261	+3.25%
2017	2,466	+1.75%
2023	2,693	+1.48%
Source: INSEE

== Climate ==
Cubzac's climate is oceanic, part of the Dfb group in the Köppen climate classification. Periodically, the river Dordogne causes flooding. Nowadays Cubzac is protected by a dam, but is still vulnerable to flooding during high tides and strong winds. Flooding occurred last in the 1999 Martin and 2010 Xynthia storms. The 1999 storm destroyed many trees from the Terrefort castle park. In 1708, a temperature extremum of -15 °C caused the river and vineyards to freeze.

== Administration ==
Administratively, Cubzac-les-Ponts is a commune part of the Nouvelle-Aquitaine region, the Gironde département, the arrondissement of Blaye and the canton of Le Nord-Gironde. Before 2006, it was part of the arrondissement of Bordeaux. The current mayor of Cubzac is Alain Tabone, re-elected in 2020.

== Economy ==
In 2007, 890 inhabitants were professionally active, the unemployment rate for the population between 15 and 64 was 6,7% for men and 10,0% for women, and the average net taxable income was €21 593. Of the 310 jobs available in Cubzac, only 34,9% were given to its inhabitants. As of 1 January 2010, there were no hotels and no camping sites in Cubzac. Agriculture in Cubzac is mostly dedicated to vine, corn and hay. In 2000, 244 ha of Cubzac's land was farmland, representing 25% of the total 987 ha.

== History ==
The first traces of settlements in Cubzac date back to the Magdalenian epoch. Those were discovered in the late nineteenth and early twentieth centuries, with scrapers, chisels, nuclei, and harpoons found. Cut and polished axes, arrowheads, scrapers, awls and flint strikers, and a few fragments of pottery from the Neolithic epoch are plentiful in Cubzac, especially on the mound of the "Four Sons of Amon". A very large bronze deposit for making weapons was found from the time of the Bronze and Iron Ages. The town was mentioned in the Roman epoch as a surveillance post. Already, crossing the river Dordogne was done at Cubzac. The town has been reconverted through the centuries. The territory was occupied from the 6th century BC by a Bituriges Vivisques tribe. The village was occupied in 1250 by Simon de Montfort, 6th Earl of Leicester. The centre of Cubzac is built on a small hill that dominates the Dordogne valley.

The village has developed from the domain of Cupitius, a wealthy landowner of the Gallo-Roman era, from which the name Cubzac derives.

=== Ancient crossing methods ===
The first ferries crossing the Dordogne were flat-bottomed boats driven by oars or keelboats driven by a sail. The passage was very risky and accidents occurred, especially during high tides and storms. From 1754, a cable ferry crossed the 550 m wide river. The cable lay above the waters and stretched obliquely to the current. In 1821, the cable ferry was replaced by a two-part ferry powered by a carousel of twelve horses. The horses set in motion gears which in turn powered a large paddle wheel. In good weather, the crossing time was improved to 30–45 minutes, but in bad weather the trip remained uncertain.

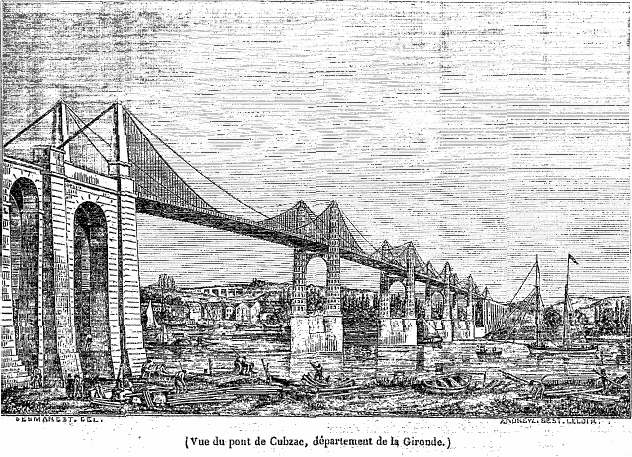
An 1841 sketch of the suspension bridge.

The decision to establish a bridge in Cubzac is taken by Napoleon Bonaparte on 30 January 1812 and 3 February 1813. The bridge was originally to be completed in 1820. However, Cubzac's first bridge was a suspension bridge for which construction works started in 1834, under Louis Philippe I. Works lasted four years, and public inauguration occurred on 17 August 1839 by the Duc and Duchesse of Orleans. The bridge had cost an estimated 3 million gold francs, was 545 m long and had 5 bays. Shortly after its construction, the pillars sank about one metre. During its 30 years of existence, it withstood storms despite the large amplitude oscillations caused. However, on 2 March 1869 a large storm, causing oscillations of more than two metres, partially destroyed the bridge and rendered it useless. Ancient methods to cross the Dordogne where reinstated. At first, barges and steamboats were used. Then, starting from October 1870, a large steam tub was used, measuring 21 m by 13 m. To cover the expensive construction costs, a toll was levied for the first 27 years.

== Current bridges ==
=== Eiffel bridge ===
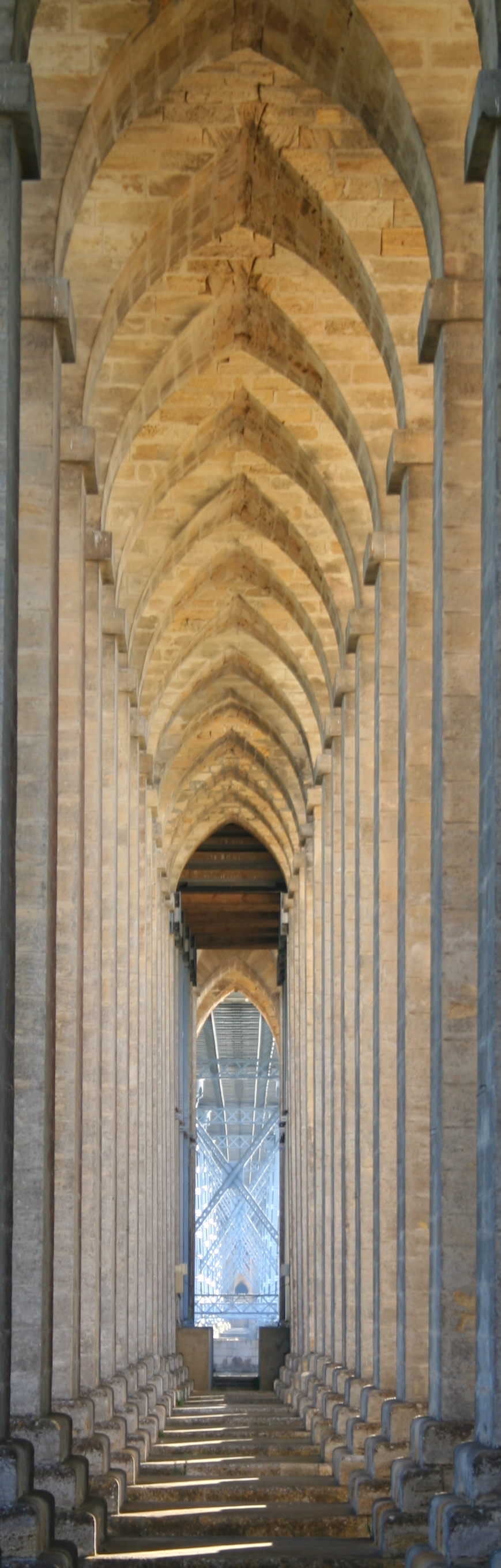
The arches under the Eiffel bridge resemble those of a cathedral.

When the suspension bridge fell in 1869, the idea of a new bridge was discussed at length. The initial project dates from 1875, which proposed that the new bridge had accompanying rail tracks, and that it be built on the remaining foundations of the suspension bridge, using scaffolding. Actually, given the height of the bridge and the river's depth and current, scaffolding is almost technically impossible to implement. In the final project from 1878, a jetting alternative was offered, despite very few companies mastering the technique at the time. The problem of fitting rail tracks, which was later abandoned, delayed the project.

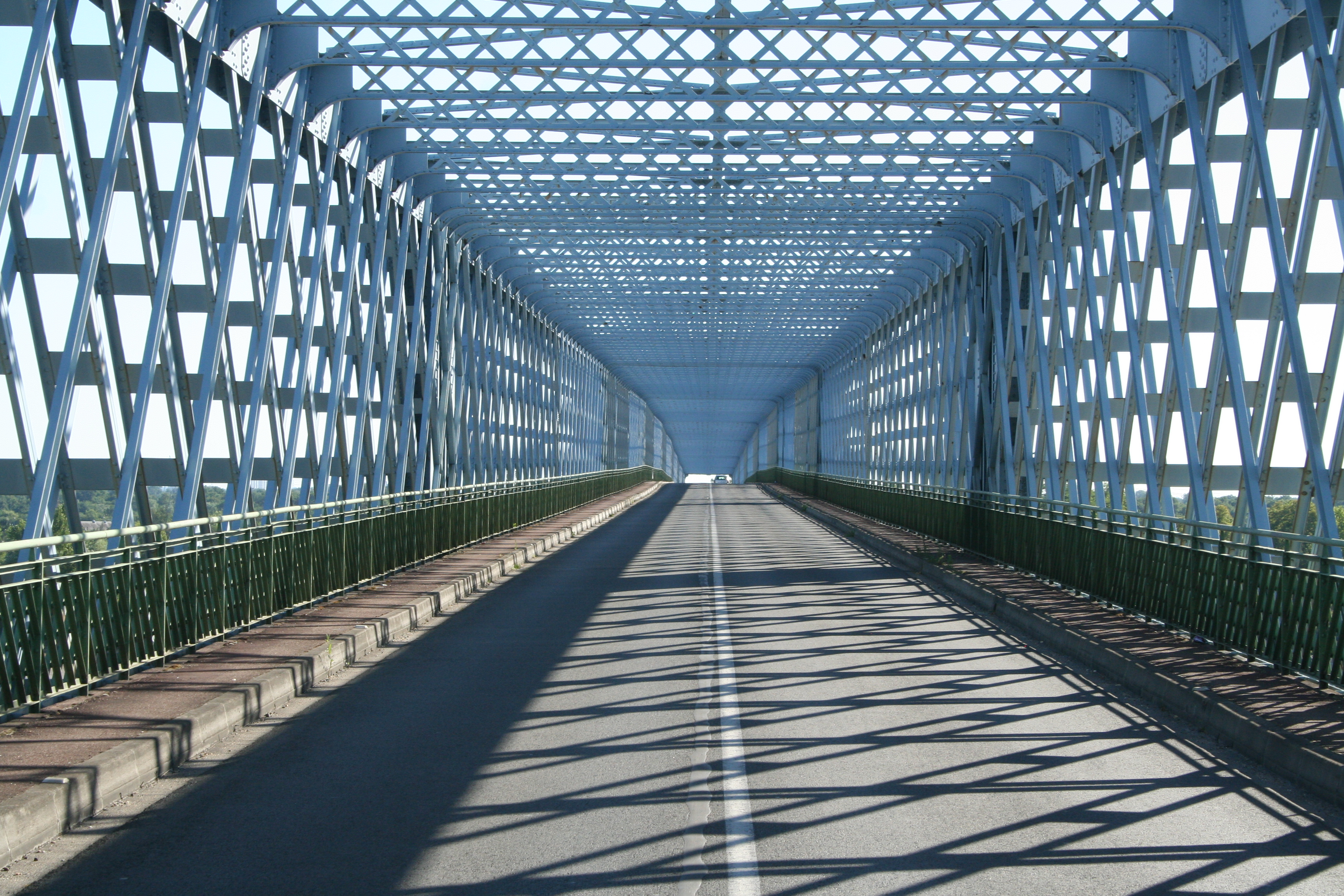
A view of the Eiffel bridge from inside.

In 1873, masonry works had started on the right bank. In 1879, Gustave Eiffel, who had waited more than ten years for a positive response to his project, took in hand the large undertaking in Cubzac, which finished in 1883. The Cubzac bridge is the most important roadwork by the Eiffel company. It necessitated 3284 tonnes of metal, measures 552 m, and is divided in eight bays. The parapet consists of iron braces rather than solid walls, alleviating the structure. The company manufacturing the iron pieces later provided those used for the Eiffel Tower.

As the Allies landed in Normandy, the German troupes, in their escape, partially destroyed the Eiffel bridge using explosives. Starting from 21 August 1944, all traffic on the bridge was restricted for the retirement of the German troupes. On 28 August 1944, as the last soldiers passed, German engineers arrived in bicycles and fitted explosives which detonated at 9:20pm. Three of the eight bays had fallen in the waters and the North abutment was seriously damaged. The delicate repair works where operated by the company Anciens Ets Eiffel with the help of the Entreprise Générale Industrielle du Sud-Ouest, which coincidentally was directed by Jacques Eiffel, the grandson of Gustave Eiffel. For this reason, the bridge is sometimes called "the twice Eiffel bridge".

The bridge is now part of the Route nationale 10 which runs between Hendaye and Paris. Both viaducts to the bridge date from 1839 and each measures approximately 250 m. Over time, large settlements occurred, causing serious disturbances in the masonry and requiring the replacement of many vaults in 1880, 1903 and 1934.

=== Railway bridge ===
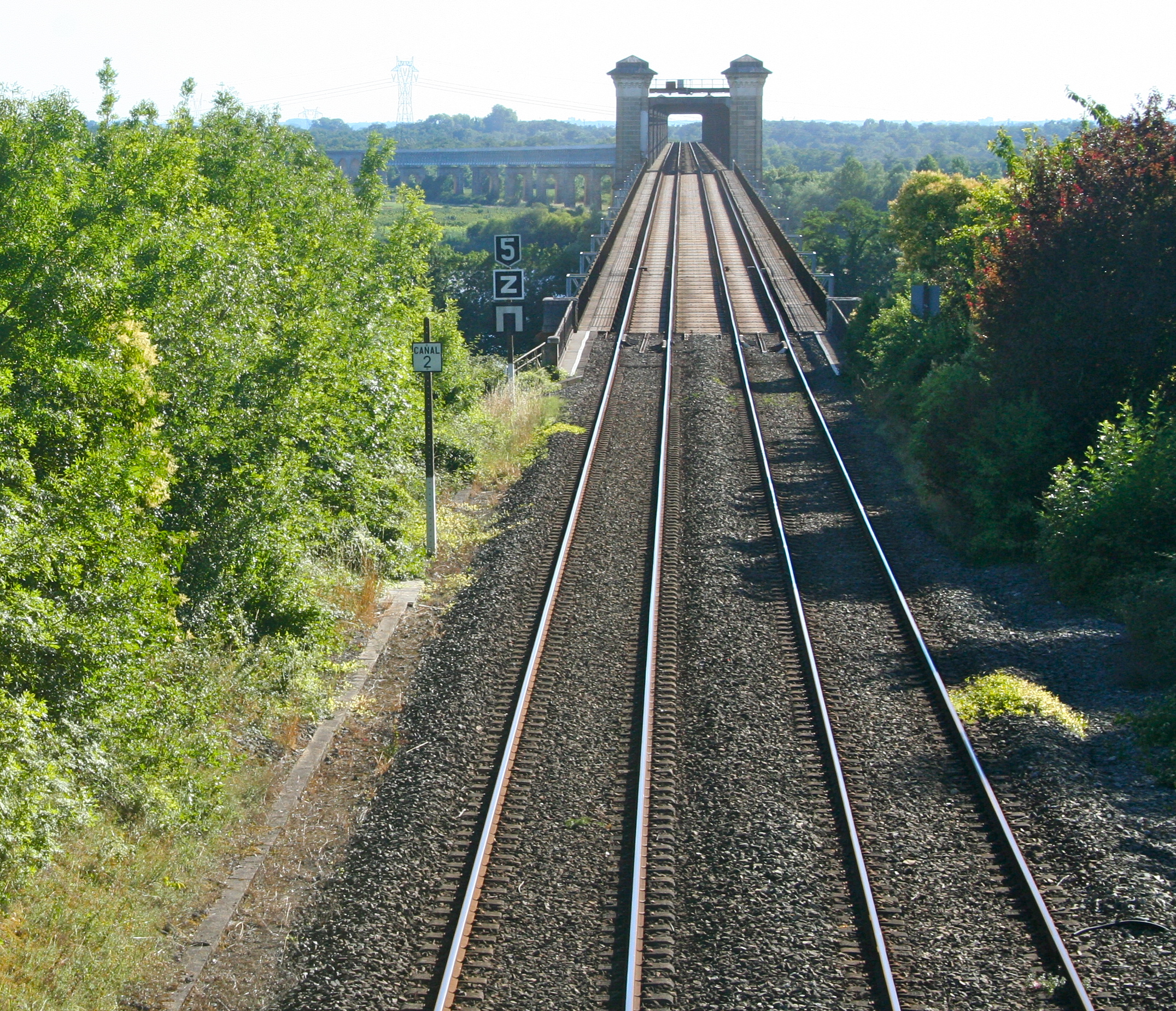
The style of the railway bridge is reminiscent of the Eiffel bridge nearby.

The rail bridge was constructed by Lebrun, Dayde and Pile by the compagnie Deyle et Pillet. Its style resembles that of the adjacent Eiffel bridge. It was commissioned by the Chemins de Fer de l'État for the Chartres-Bordeaux line, and the construction lasted from 1884 to 1885. Inaugurated in 1886, it is 561,60 m long above the Dordogne are divided in eight bays. The rails are 21.80 m above the highest waters. The bridge is made of iron pillars fitted in braces. Despite being younger than the Eiffel bridge, the construction necessitated more funds and effort. The constructions hidden under water and earth make up the bulk of the value and volume of materials used. Foundations only total to 57,800 cubic meters. Even though less damaged than the Eiffel bridge, it also sustained damage from German bombing on the same day. The reconstruction works ended on 15 June 1946, having taken less than two years to complete.

=== Motorway bridge ===
In 1957 it was decided to study the implementation of a bridge to relieve the old Eiffel bridge which allowed only one lane per direction, and reduce traffic jams. From 1957 to 1963 various solutions where studies. In 1971 the construction works were tendered and given to the company Campenon-Bernard-Europe. The works should have lasted only two years but were completed in 1974. The new motorway bridge made of reinforced concrete, having relieved the traffic jams, was celebrated on radio, and by the song "Ne partez pas en vacances, ne partez pas!" (Do not, do not go on holiday!) by Pierre Perret. In 2000, the bridge was doubled to 2x3 lanes.

== Sights ==
=== Saint-Julien church ===
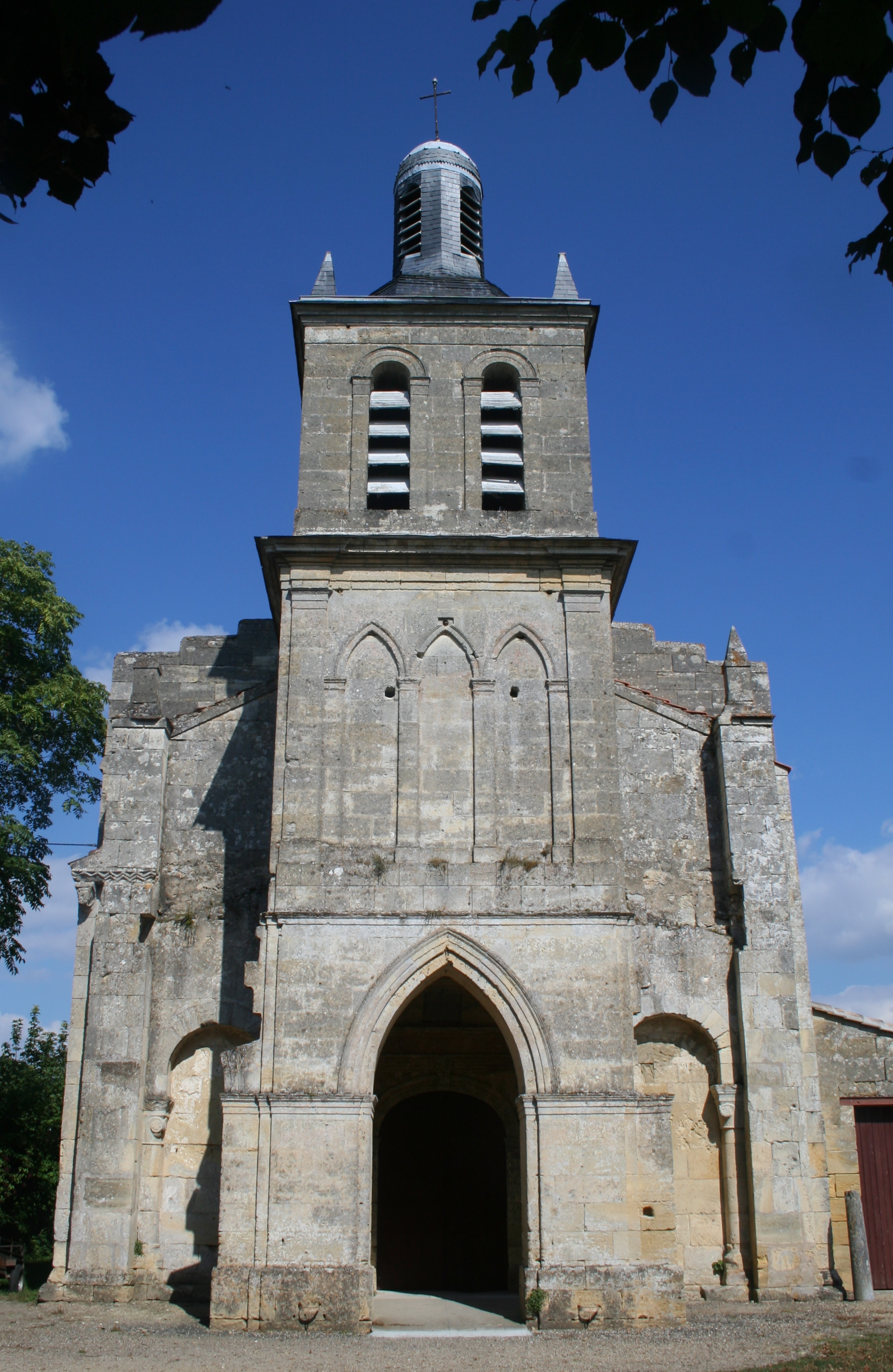
The church of Cubzac.

The Saint-Julien church is named after Julian the Hospitaller, patron of Cubzac. Julian is a legendary saint destined to kill his parents, and informed about his destiny by a stag. He fled to escape his fate, but the prophecy realized nonetheless, and he became a hermit, helping people cross a river. One day, the Christ arrived to announce his pardon. From the Middle Ages to the French Revolution, the town would have been called Saint-Julien-de-Cubzac. The church is made of limestone and underwent important modifications in the 19th century, when in particular the steeple was rebuilt. The façade, however, still contains Roman remains. The church holds an 18th-century painting of the Baptism of Christ, classified Monument historique in 1913. The church is surrounded by a cemetery which was excavated in August 1978 by archaeologists under the direction of Richard Boudet. Coins dating from the time of Francis I, Henry III, Henry IV, Louis XIII, Napoleon III, and Victor Emmanuel II were uncovered. A gold Merovingian signet ring bearing the Christian symbol Ichthys was also discovered under many potsherds.

=== Four Sons of Amon castle ===
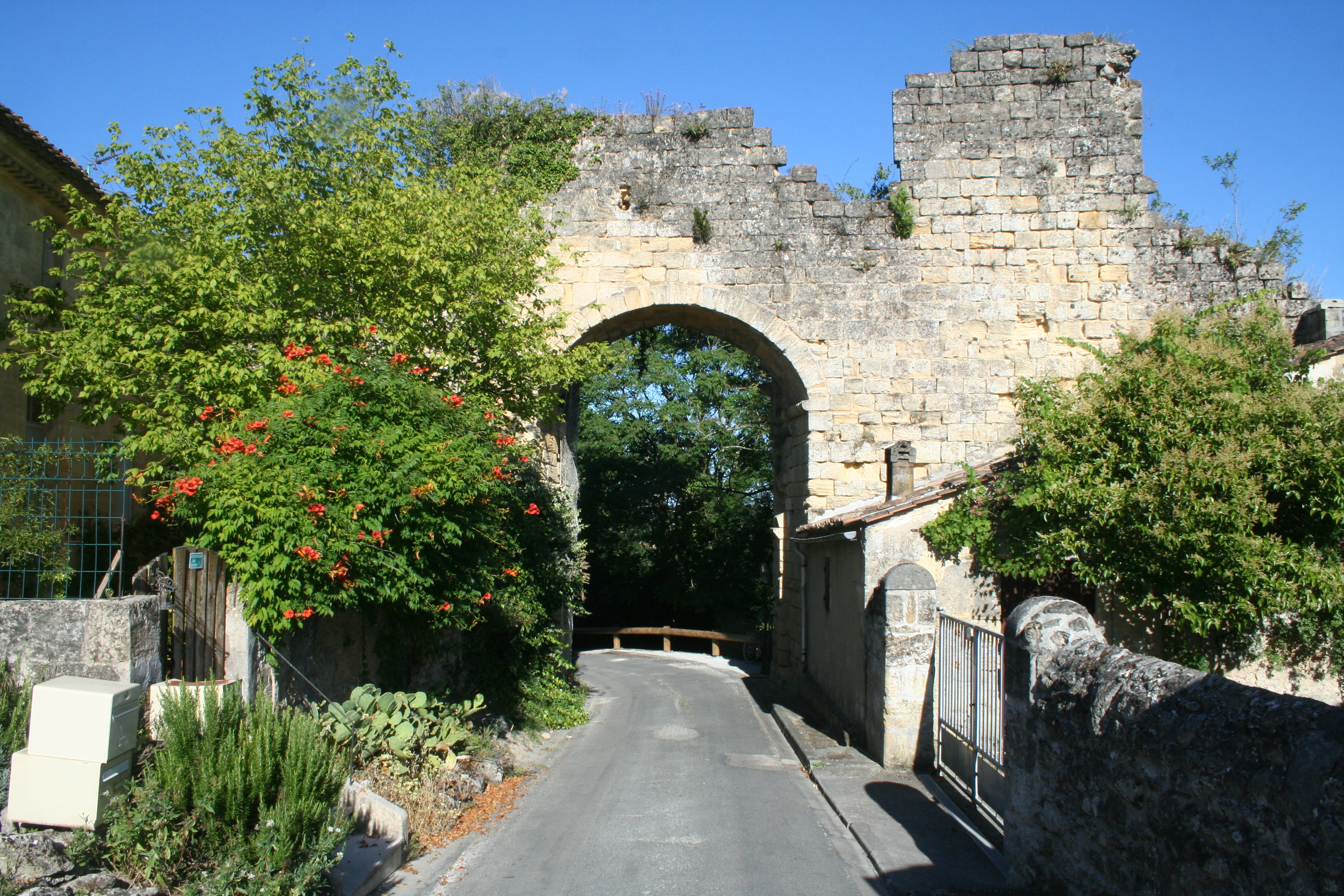
The remains of the Four Sons of Amon castle

At Cubzac, on the high rocky shoreline overlooking the Dordogne, and in the town centre, are the ruins of the castle "des Quatre fils Aymon" within ordinary houses. The entrance of the fortress is flanked by the remains of two towers. These few stones are however extraordinarily rich in history and legend. First off, the castle did not belong to the four sons of Aymon who lived, perhaps, the time of Charlemagne. It was built and rebuilt in the twelfth and thirteenth centuries. It was the seat of the lordship of Cubzaguais. In 1206, John Lackland, the king of England and youngest son of Eleanor of Aquitaine, took revenge of the king of France Philippe Auguste, who accused him of treason and deprived him of his fiefs, by engaging in miscellaneous abuses. He stormed the castle of Cubzac, and destroyed it. It is a brief English victory. The lordship returns to the French, and is attributed to Simon de Montfort, 6th Earl of Leicester, son of the terrible and bloody winner of the Albigensian Crusade. He built a new castle deemed impregnable, on behalf of the King of England, with double walls, and yet it is the one for which ruins remain. He was sacked by the Gascon barons revolted against Simon de Montfort. Half sacked, it served as a stately home, until moving to the lordship Bouih. The legions days that the two mediaeval castles have erected on the site of a building dating from the Carolingian period, which nothing remains. The Four Sons of Amon castle was registered as a historic monument in 1938.

=== Terrefort-Quancard castle ===
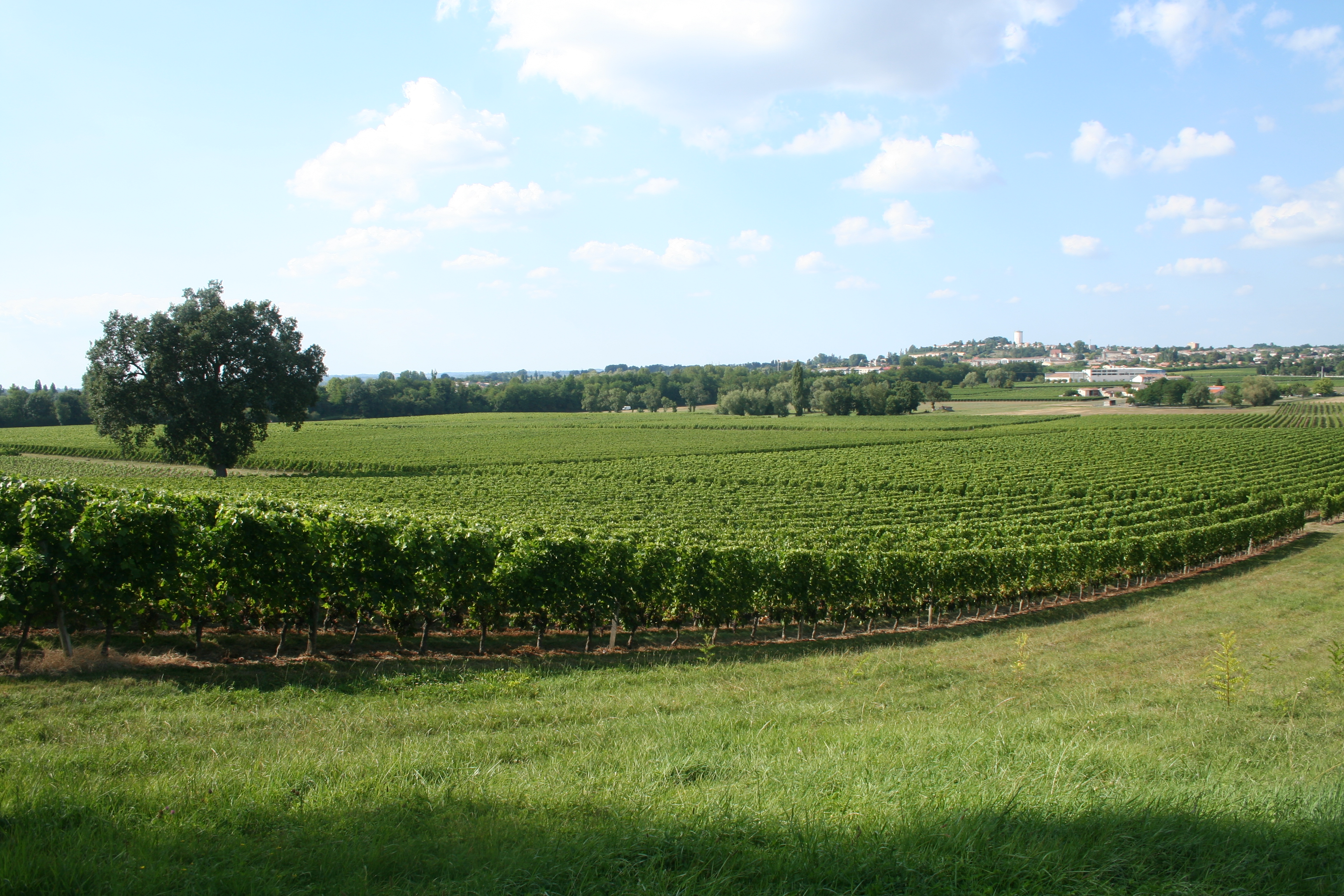
Vineyard of the Terrefort-Quancard castle

Positioned atop a hill dominating Cubzac-les-Ponts and Saint-André-de-Cubzac, the Terrefort-Quancard castle is a wine property and family house. The main building is a limestone rectangular body of living area, covered with slate for the roof. The surrounding grape wines, most of which are Cabernet Sauvignon and Merlot, span approximately 70 hectares of land. Various vestiges remain, including a wash for linen and horses, and a wind-will for flour.

During its history spanning seven centuries, the castle was owned by a succession of seven families. One of the owners, the count Lafaurie of Monbadon, peer of France, was a catalyst to the construction of the Eiffel bridge. In March 1891, the Quancard brothers Jean and Eugène bought the property for 110 000 francs, and the Quancard family remains the last owners. The purchase came after a severe phylloxera outbreak, causing the death of over half of French vineyards, devalued the property. The land area was covered mostly with rock until the Quancard brothers used explosives to remove it, and large amounts of clay-limestone soil, known to be beneficial for the wine produce, was brought to replace it.

The Quancard family has played a role in the life and history of Cubzac-les-Ponts. Firstly, Jean Quancard was elected by absolute majority as mayor of Cubzac on 15 May 1892 and remained in office for 27 years. Also, a fair, organised annually from 1936 to 1939 for its success, supported restoration work for the Saint-Julien steeple and provided financial help to the priest. Finally, the owners periodically host events, including expositions, family weddings and family reunions. The last family reunion, from May 2006, saw approximately 200 members of the Quancard family.

=== Wine caves ===
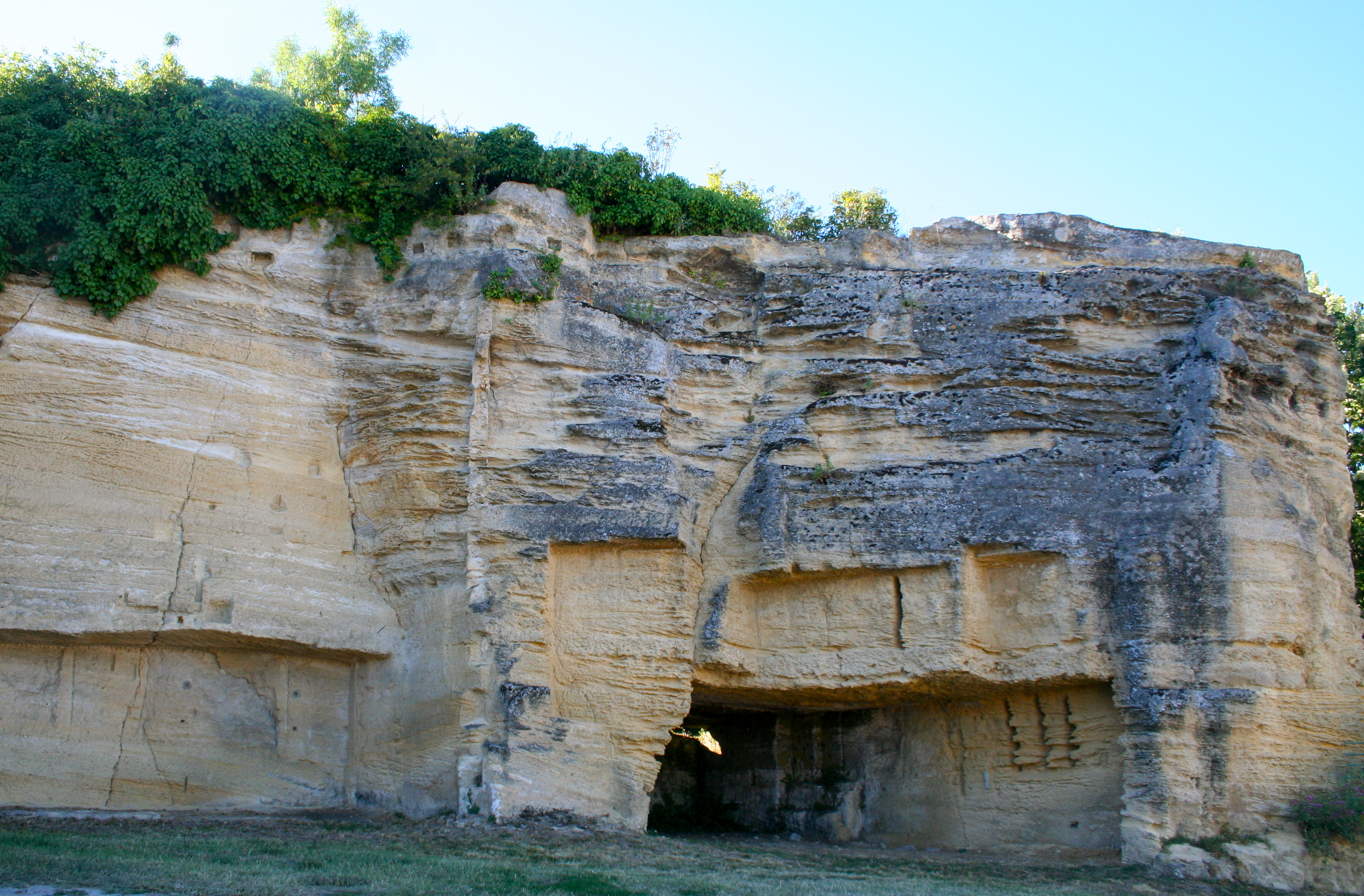
Limestone excavations near the Café de Paris

During the eighteenth and nineteenth centuries, the mound of Cubzac was slashed all around to provide stone for Bordeaux's construction and the ballast of some river banks, creating deep excavations in the limestone. In 1898, André Cousteau, uncle of the researcher and ecologist Jacques Cousteau, started using the caves to make a sparkling wine based on traditional Champagne-making techniques. The wine, treated in a closed tank, bottled, and kept neck down many months at constant temperature, became bubbly and had its impurities accumulate near the cap. Once this deposit was removed, the bottles were resealed by force, and the corks muzzled. In 1920, the Cousteau property was sold to the Société Anonyme Gay-Mousse. In 1966, the caves where entrusted to Monsieur Lateyron who, one year later, created the Café de Paris.

== See also ==
- Communes of the Gironde department
