= Victor Louis =

French architect

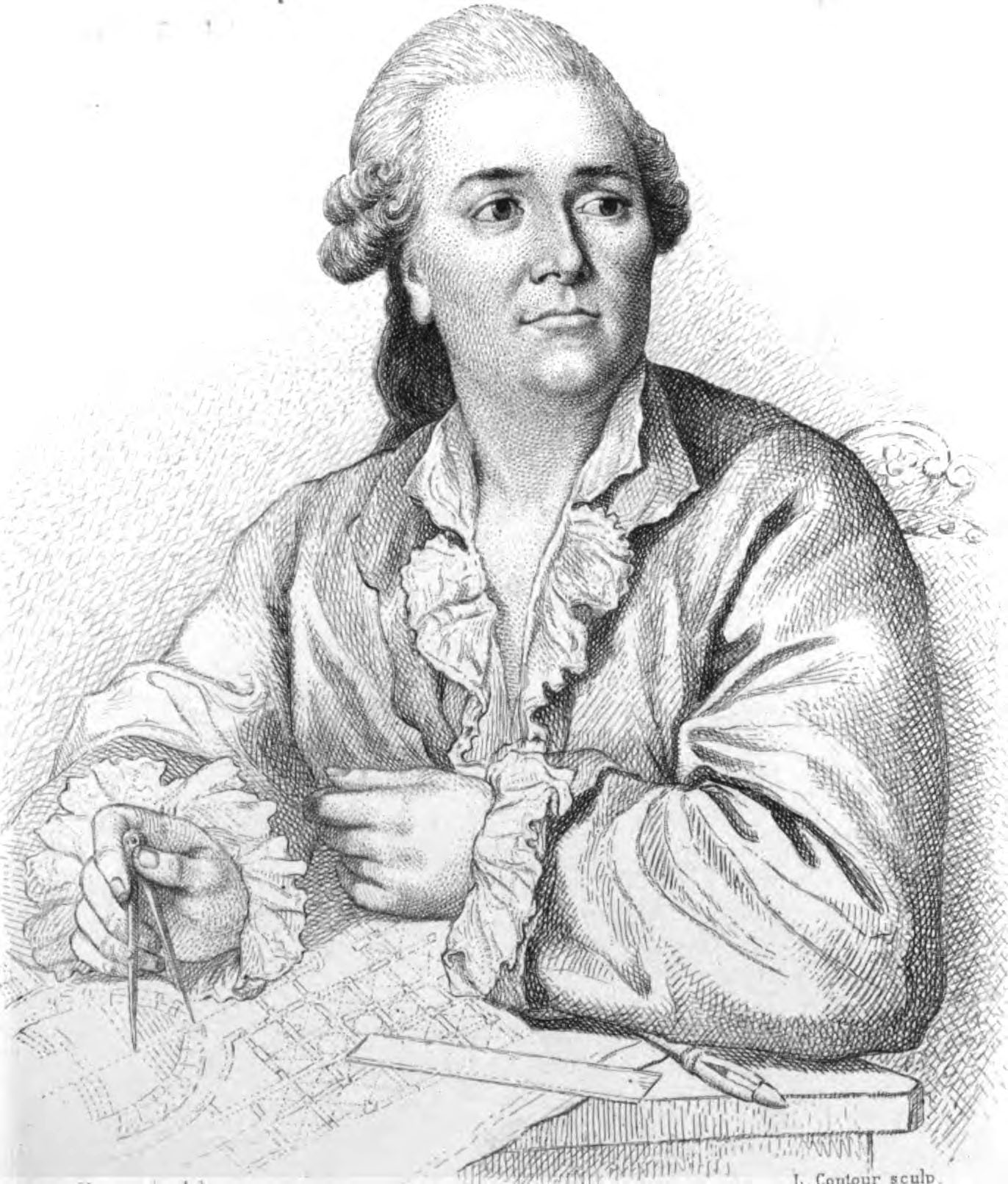
- Victor Louis
- Born: 10 May 1731; Paris, France
- Died: 2 July 1800 (aged 69); Paris, France
- Occupation: Architect
- Spouse: Marie-Emmanuelle Bayon Louis
- Children: Marie-Hélène-Victoire Louis

Victor Louis (French pronunciation: [viktɔʁ lwi]; 10 May 1731, Paris – 2 July 1800, Paris) was a French architect, disqualified on a technicality from winning the Prix de Rome in architecture in 1755.

== Life ==
He was born Louis-Nicolas Louis in Paris. He did not adopt the name Victor until after he returned from a trip to Poland in 1765. In 1770 he married the pianist and composer Marie-Emmanuelle Bayon. They had a daughter, Marie-Hélène-Victoire, in 1774. A full biography of Victor Louis was published by Charles Marionneau in Bordeaux in 1881.

== Work ==
Louis' masterpiece is the Grand Théâtre de Bordeaux of 1780. He also designed other theatres, including the Salle Richelieu on the rue de Richelieu (1790, later to become the home of the Comédie-Française) and the Théâtre National de la rue de la Loi (1793, demolished). The Salle Richelieu was the first major building with a roof structure of iron which was selected for its fire-resistant qualities when compared with wood. Other buildings include the Intendance in Besançon (completed 1776), the garden galleries of the Palais-Royal in Paris (1781–1784), the Salle de Beaujolais (1782–83), and the Château du Bouilh near Bordeaux (1786–1789, unfinished).

== Gallery ==
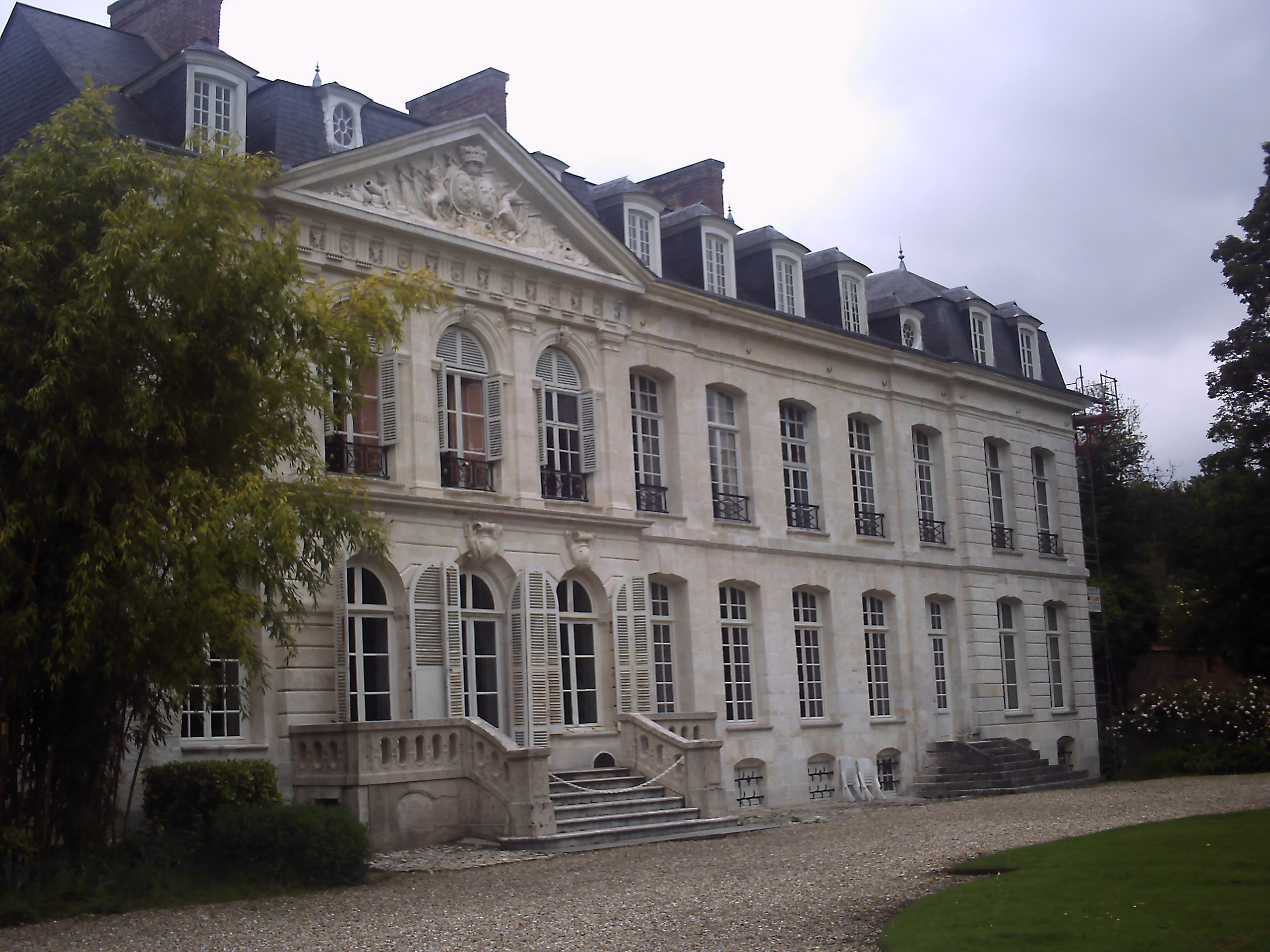
Château de Filières, Gommerville, 1768

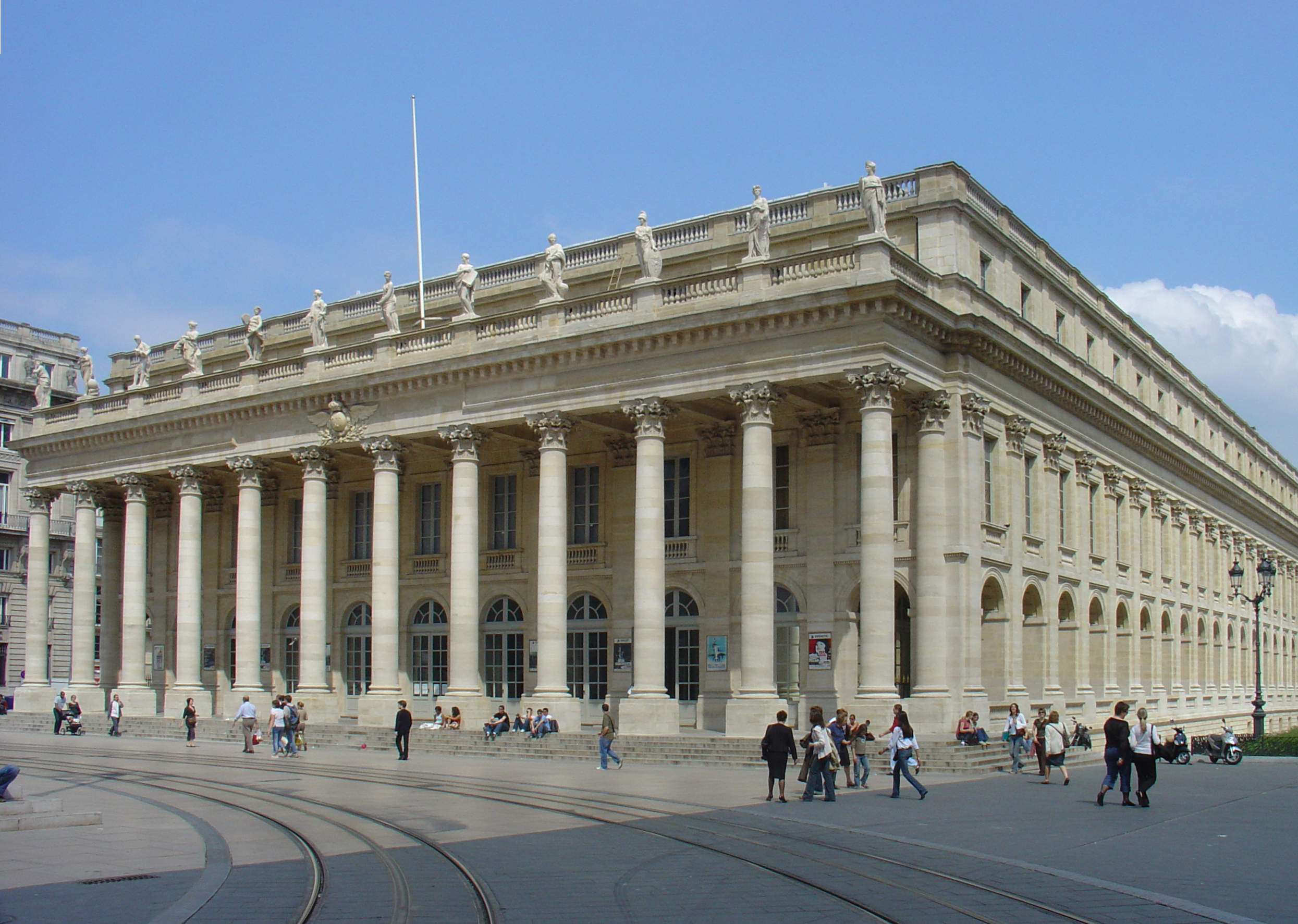
Grand Théâtre de Bordeaux, 1773–1780

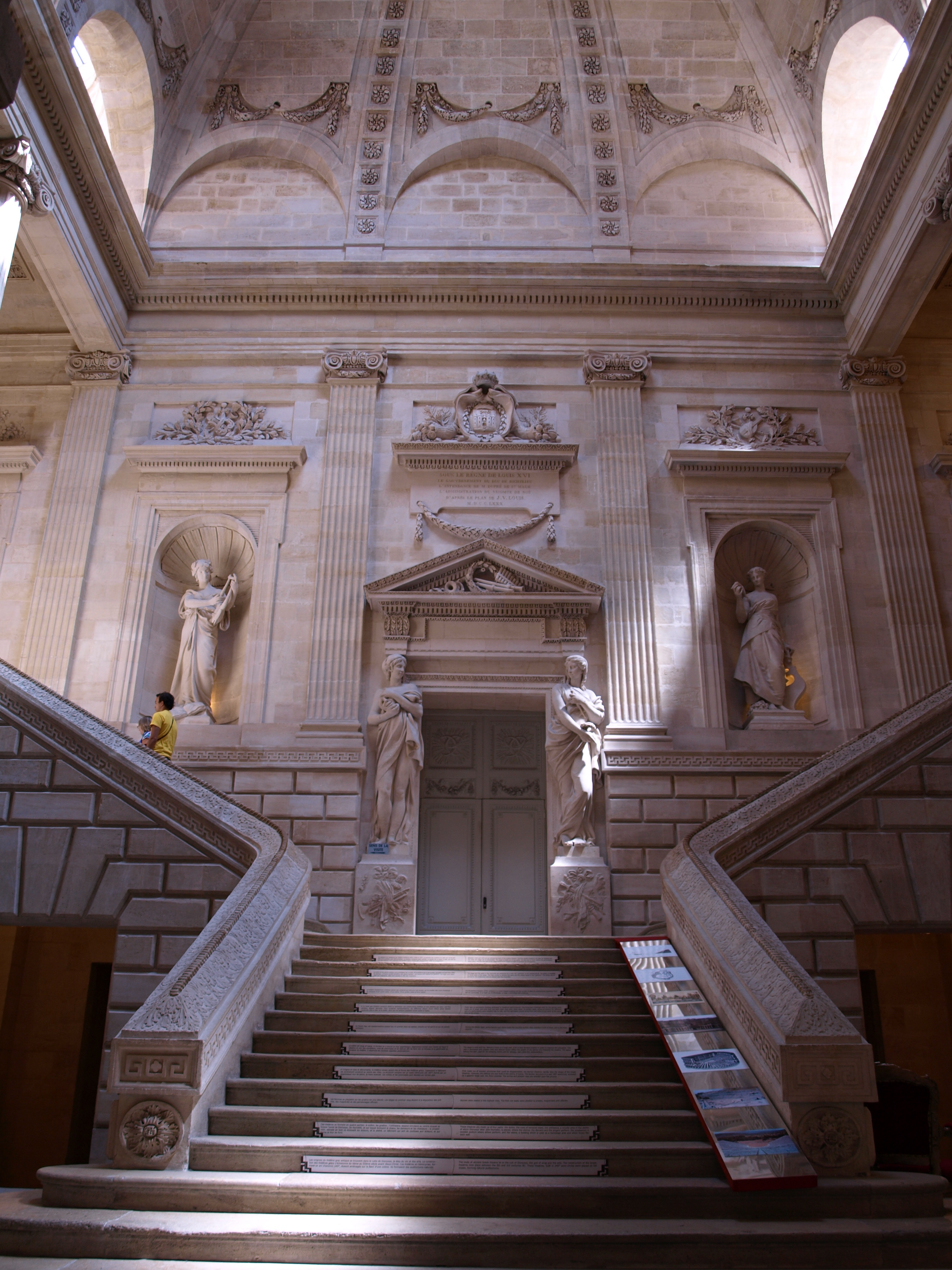
Central staircase of the Théâtre de Bordeaux

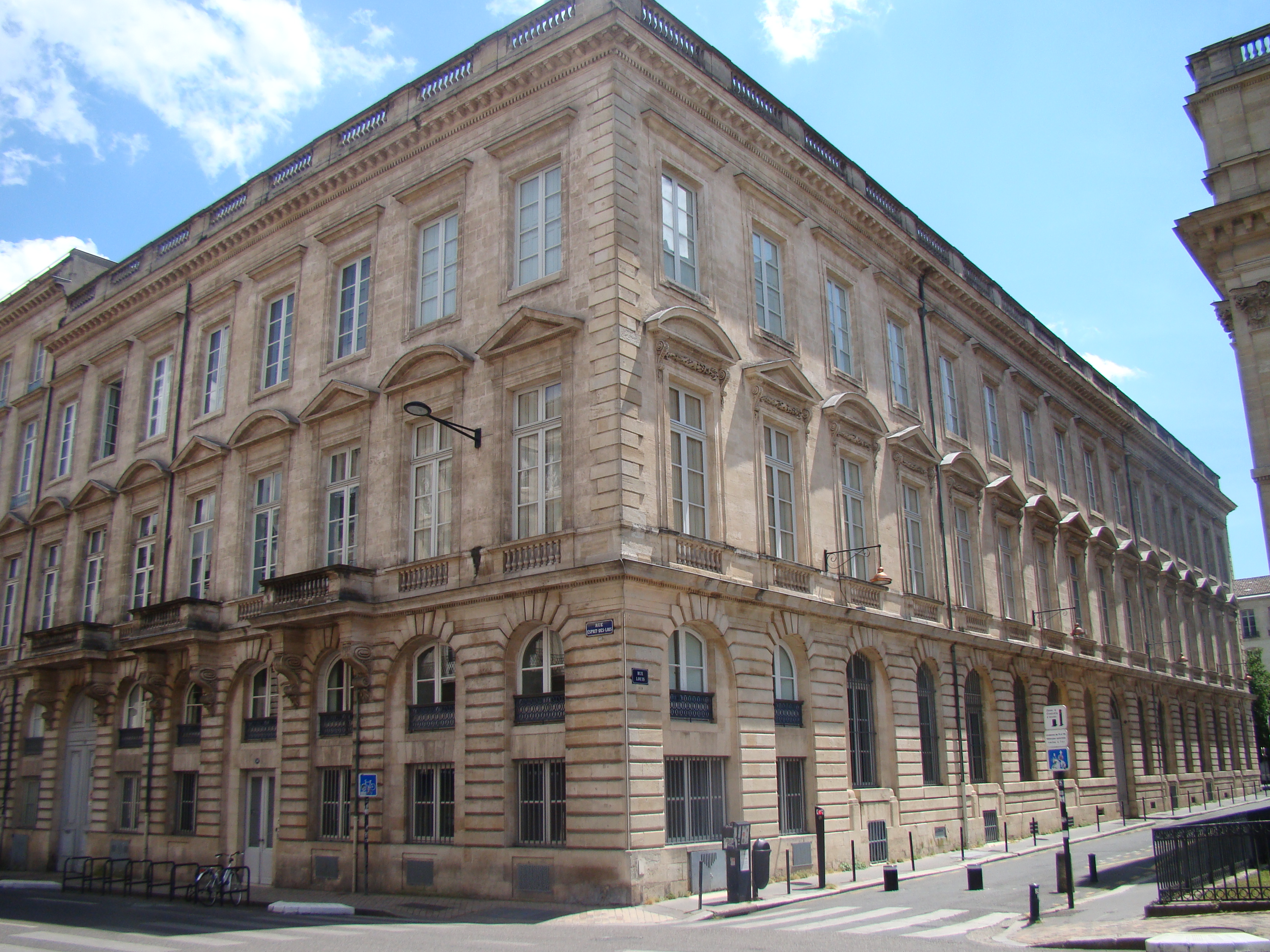
Hôtel de Saige, Bordeaux, 1775–1777

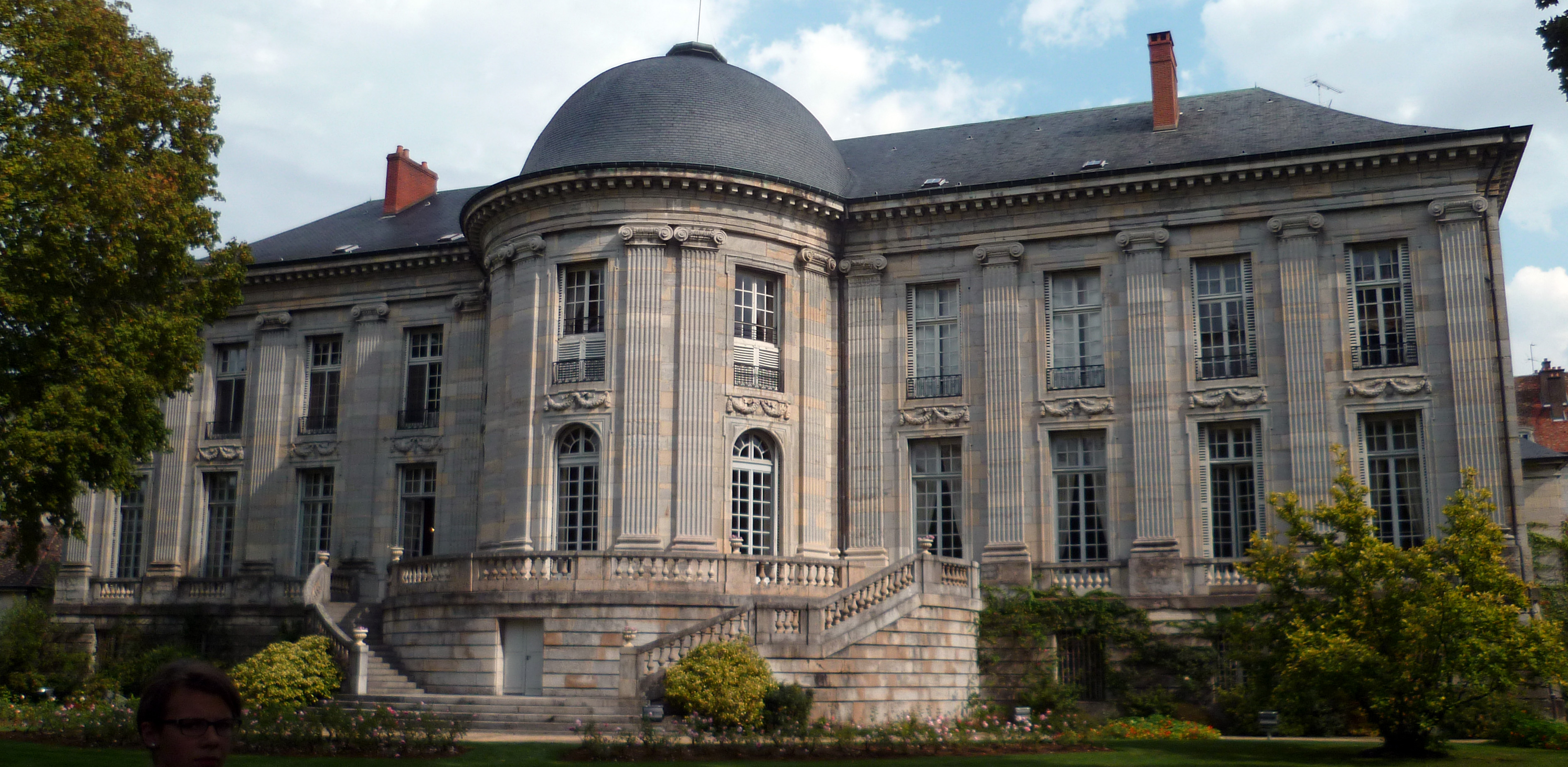
Intendance de Besançon (garden facade), 1771–1778

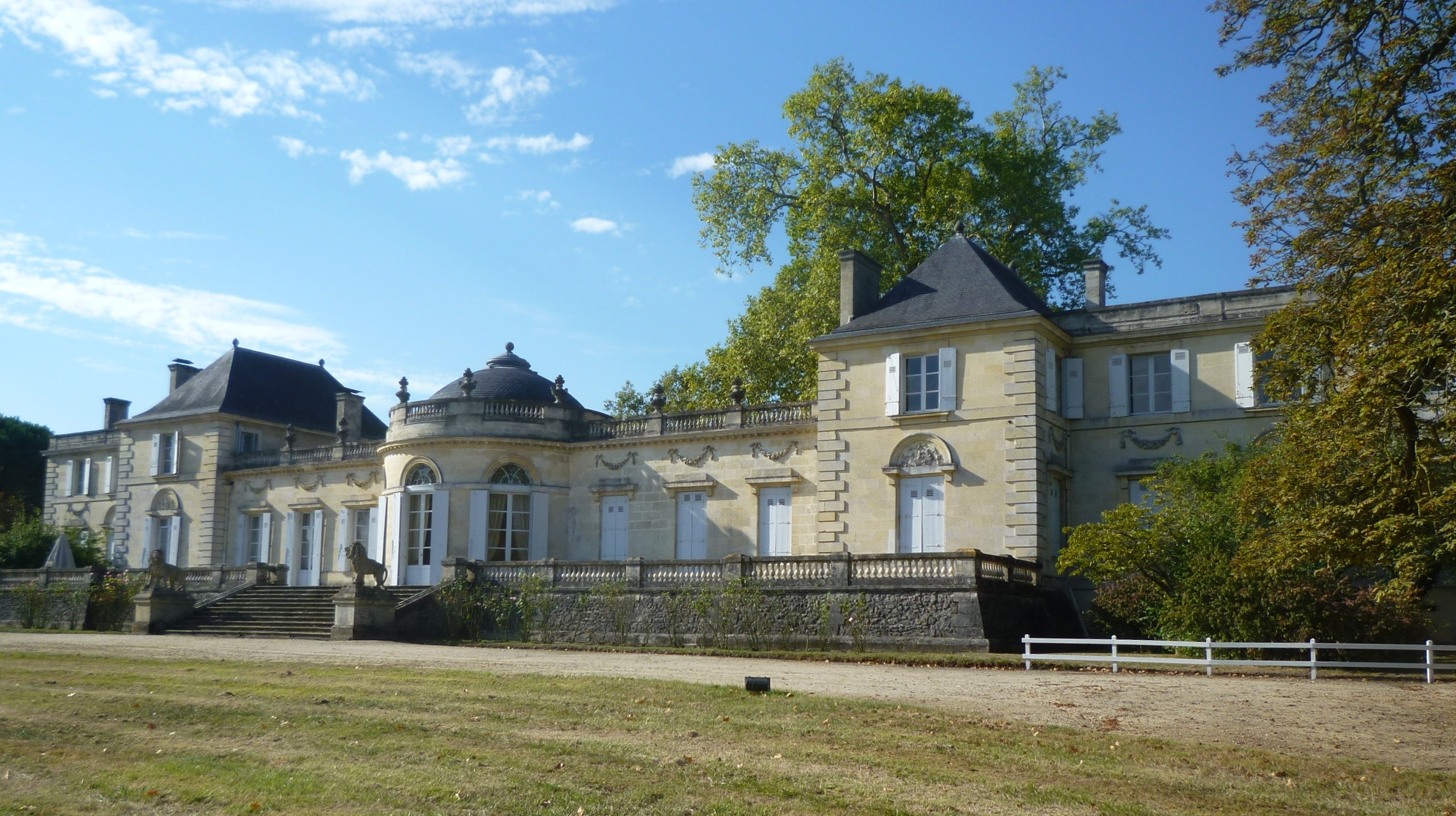
Château de Tauzia, Gradignan, 1778

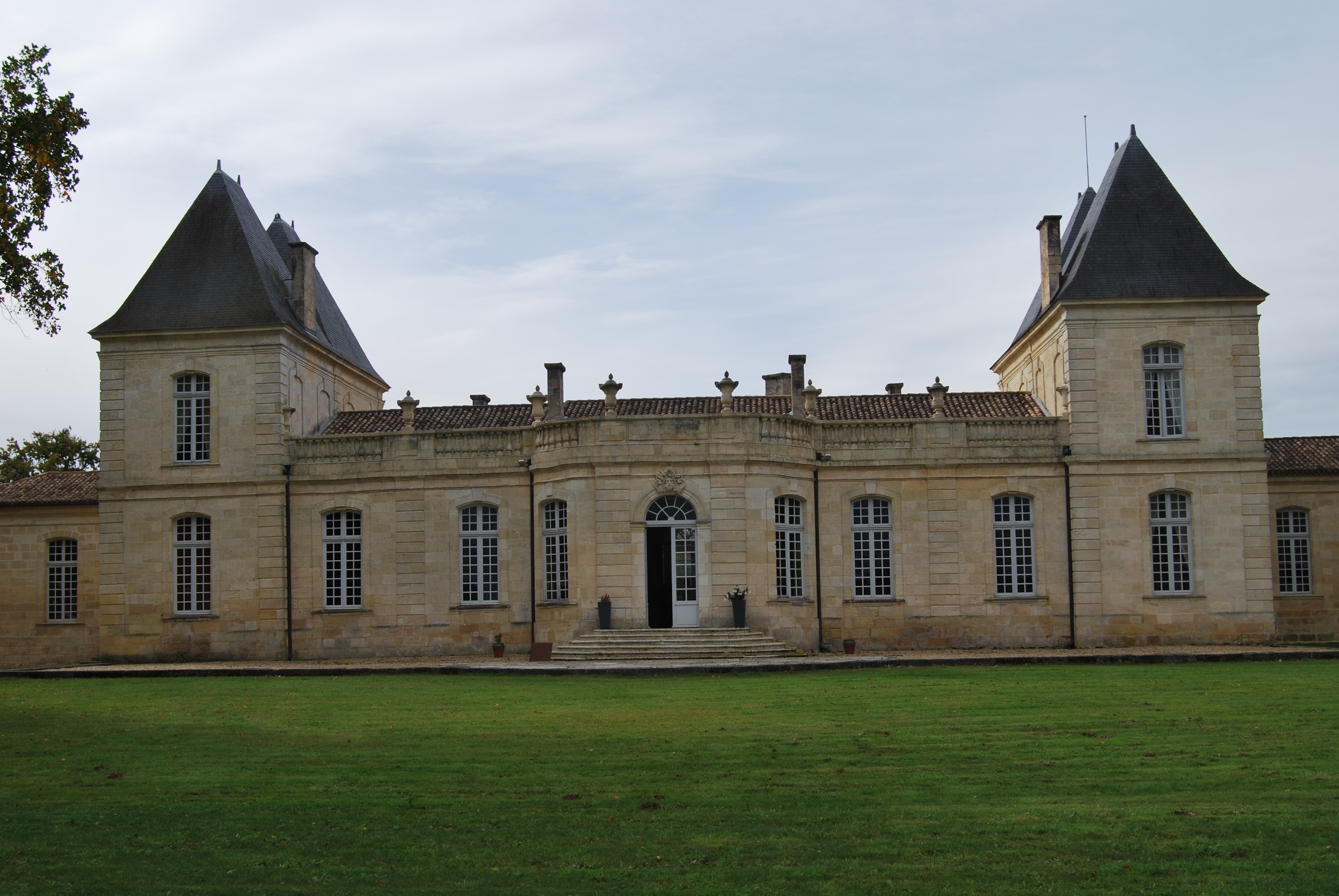
Château d'Anglade, Izon, 1778

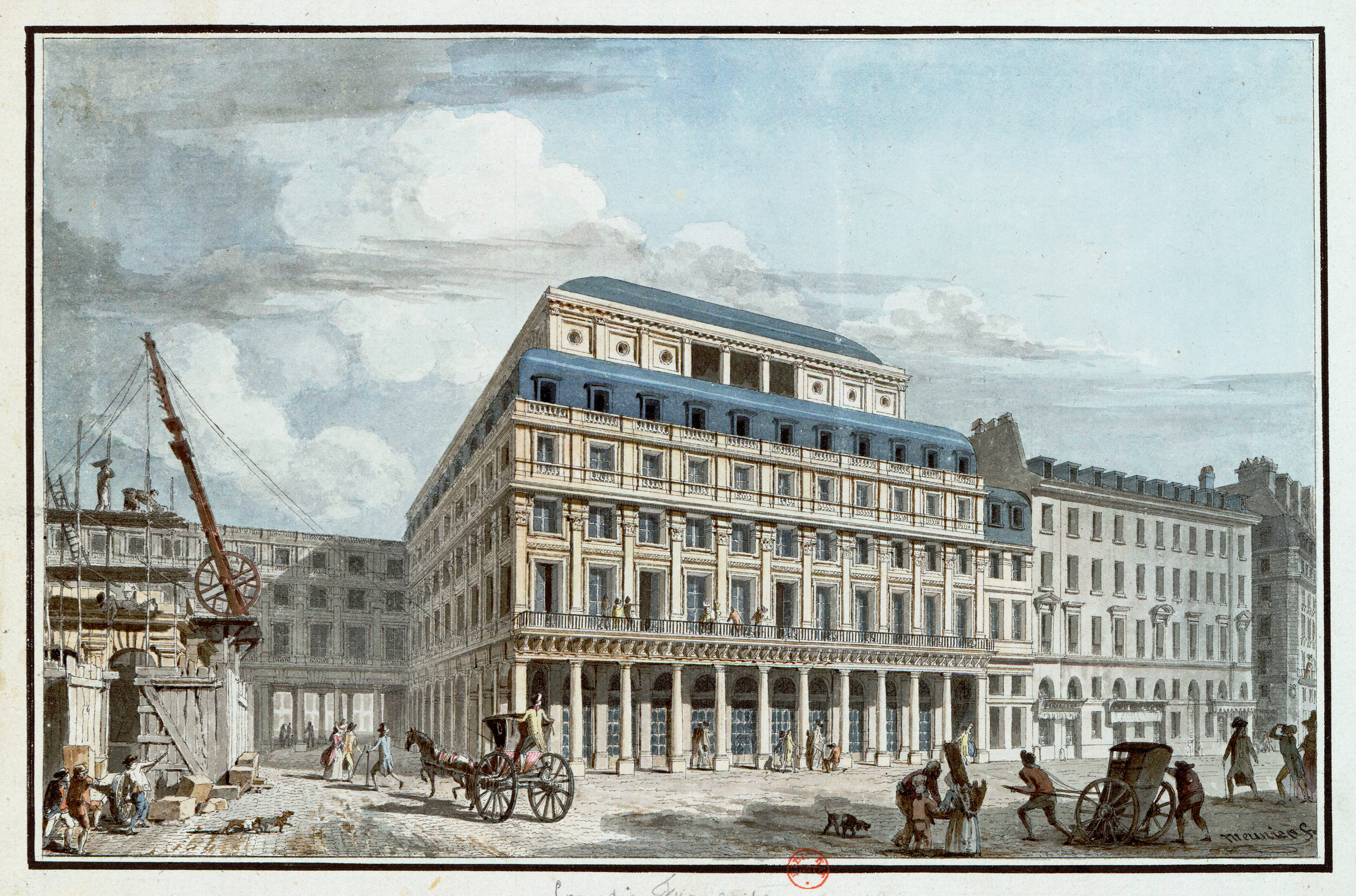
Salle Richelieu
(as designed by Louis)

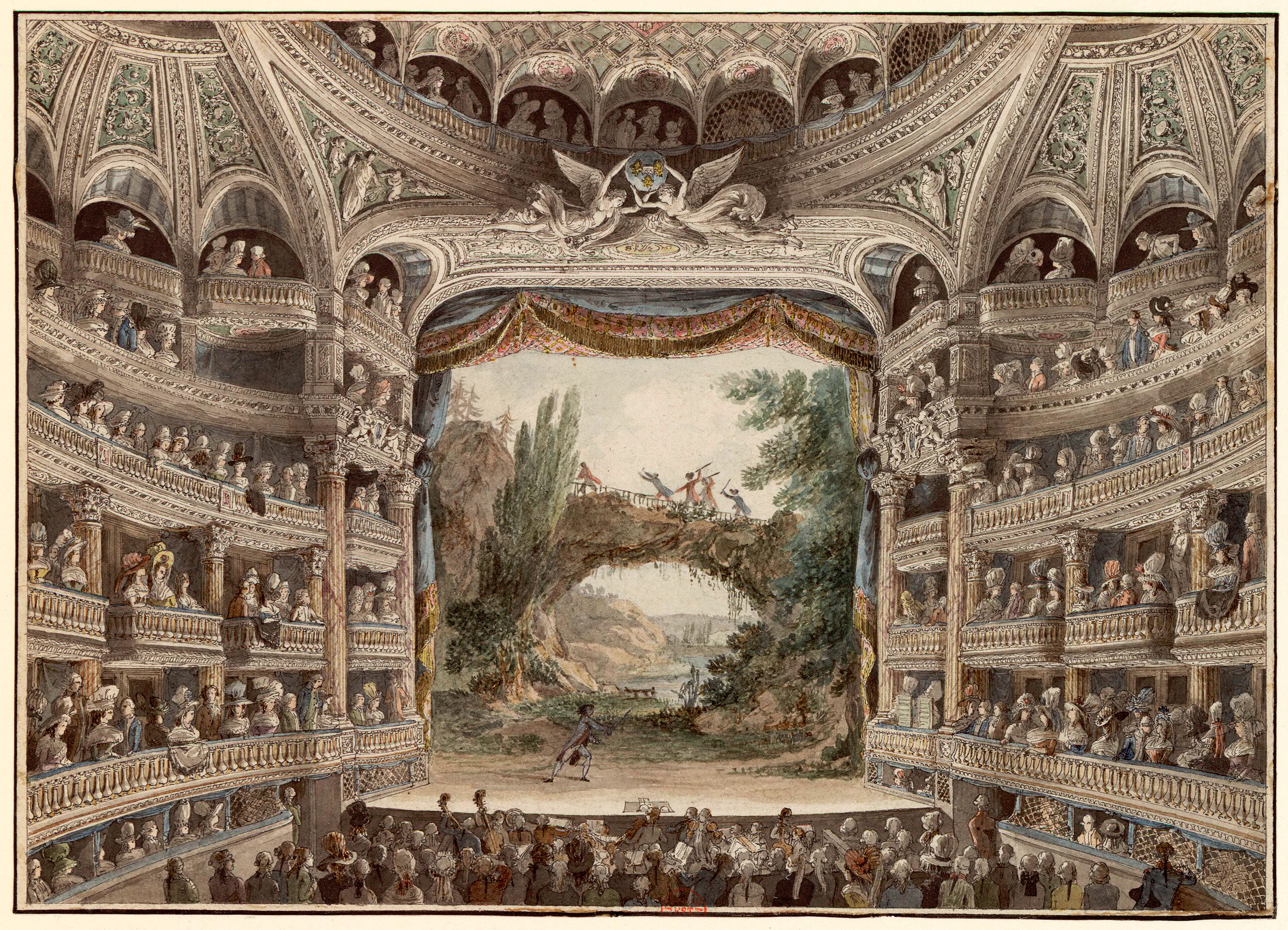
Auditorium of the Salle Richelieu
(as designed by Louis)

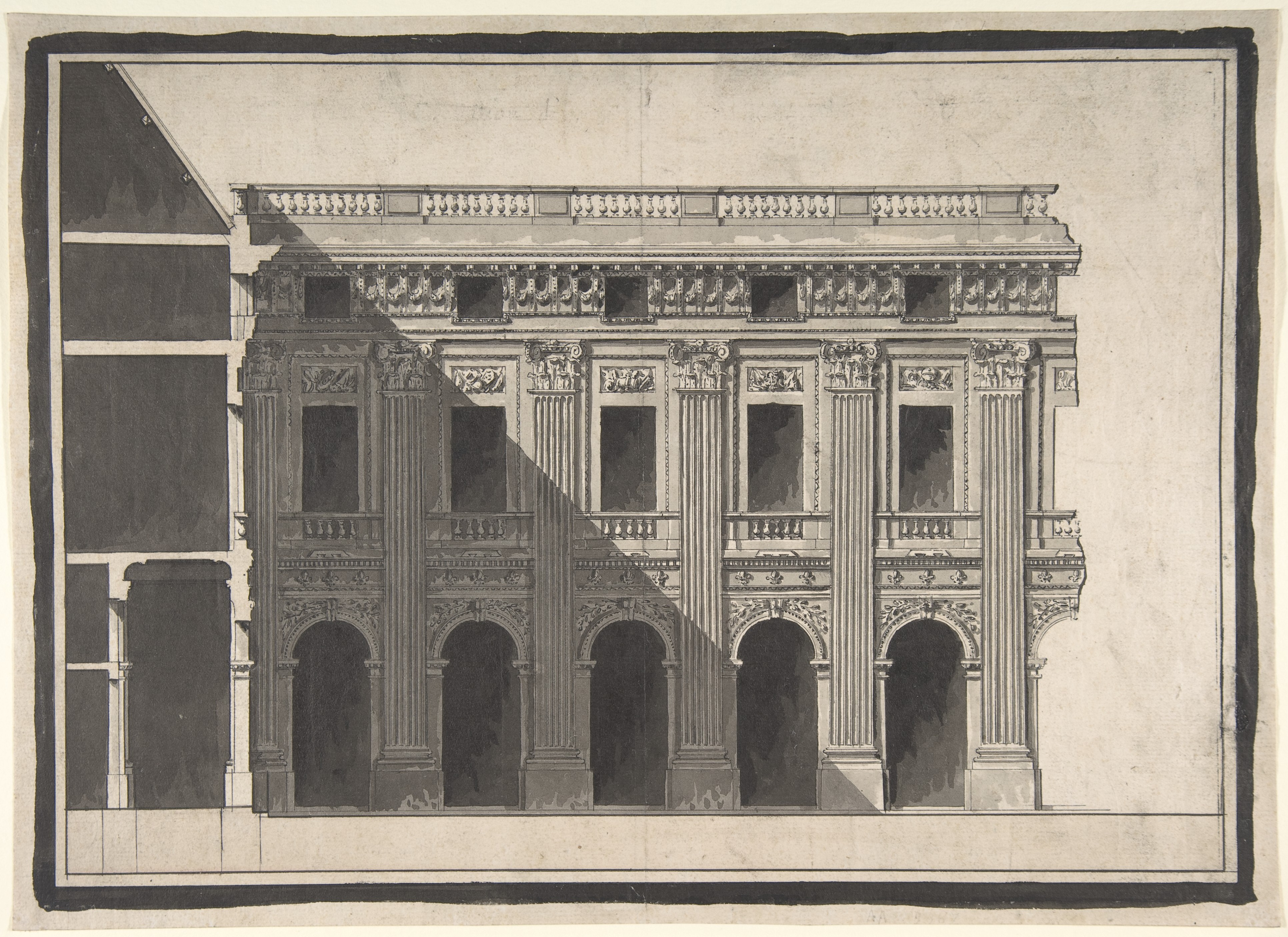
Design for the garden galleries of the Palais-Royal

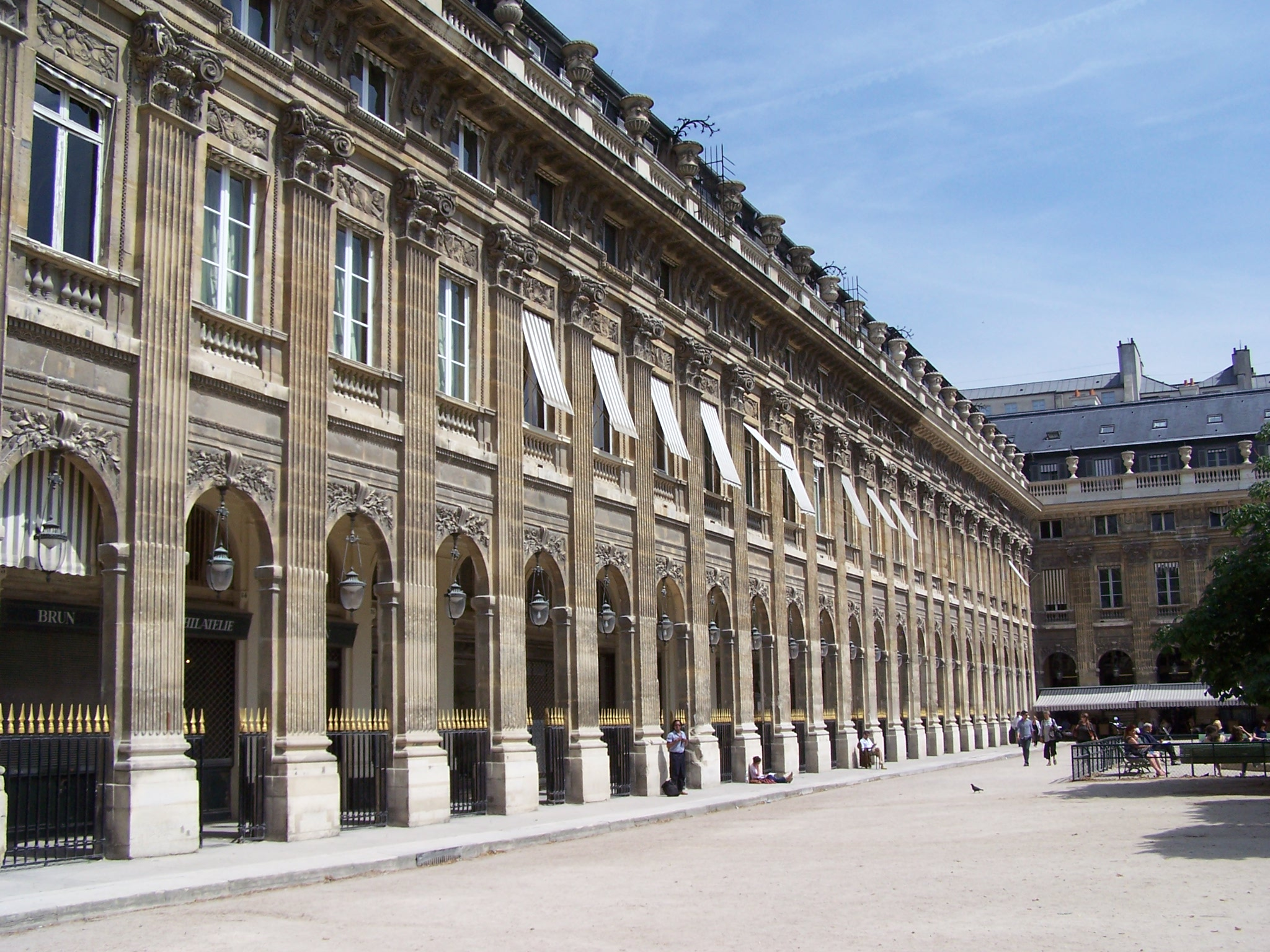
Perspective view of the garden galleries of the Palais-Royal

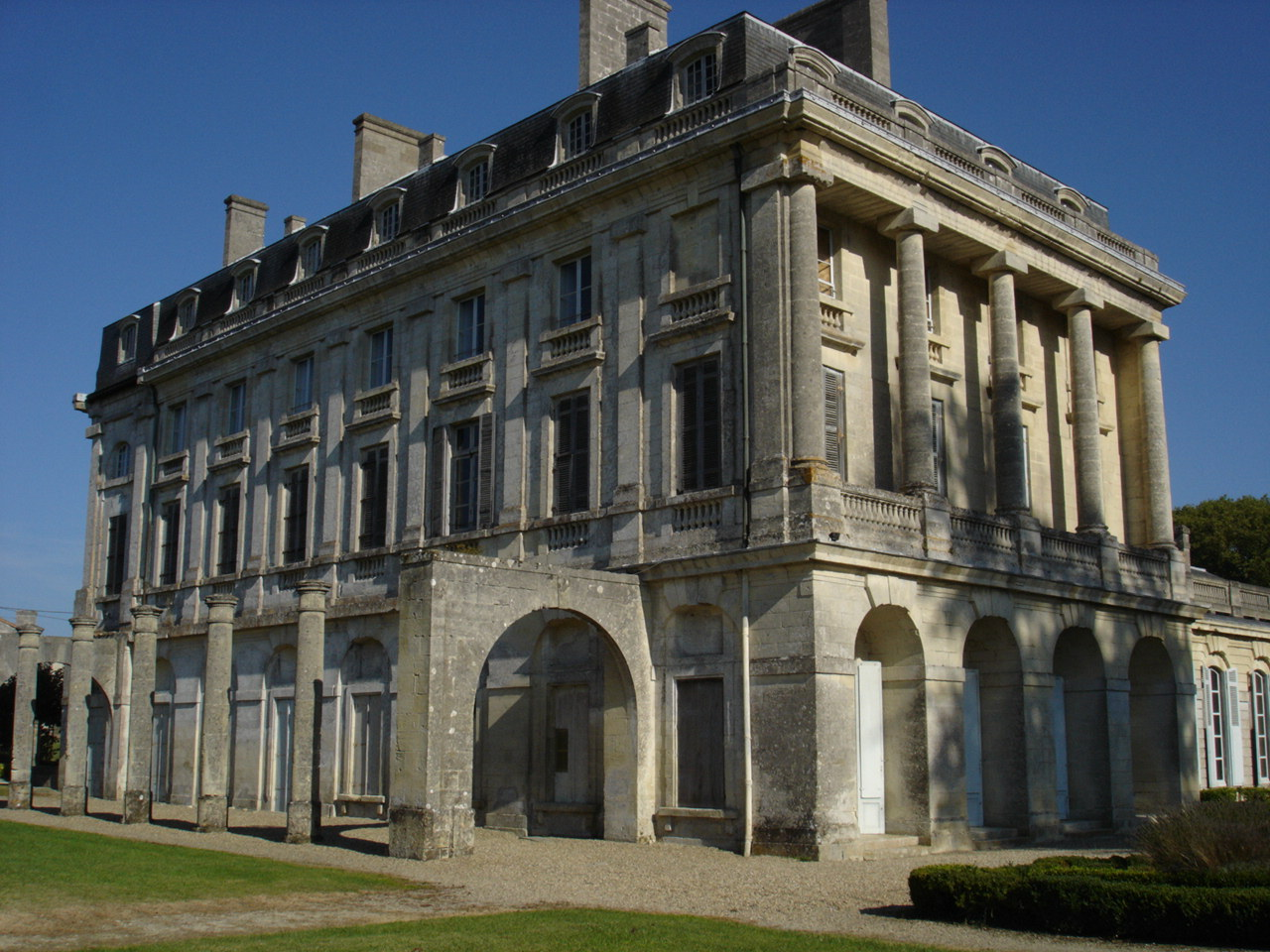
Château of Le Bouilh

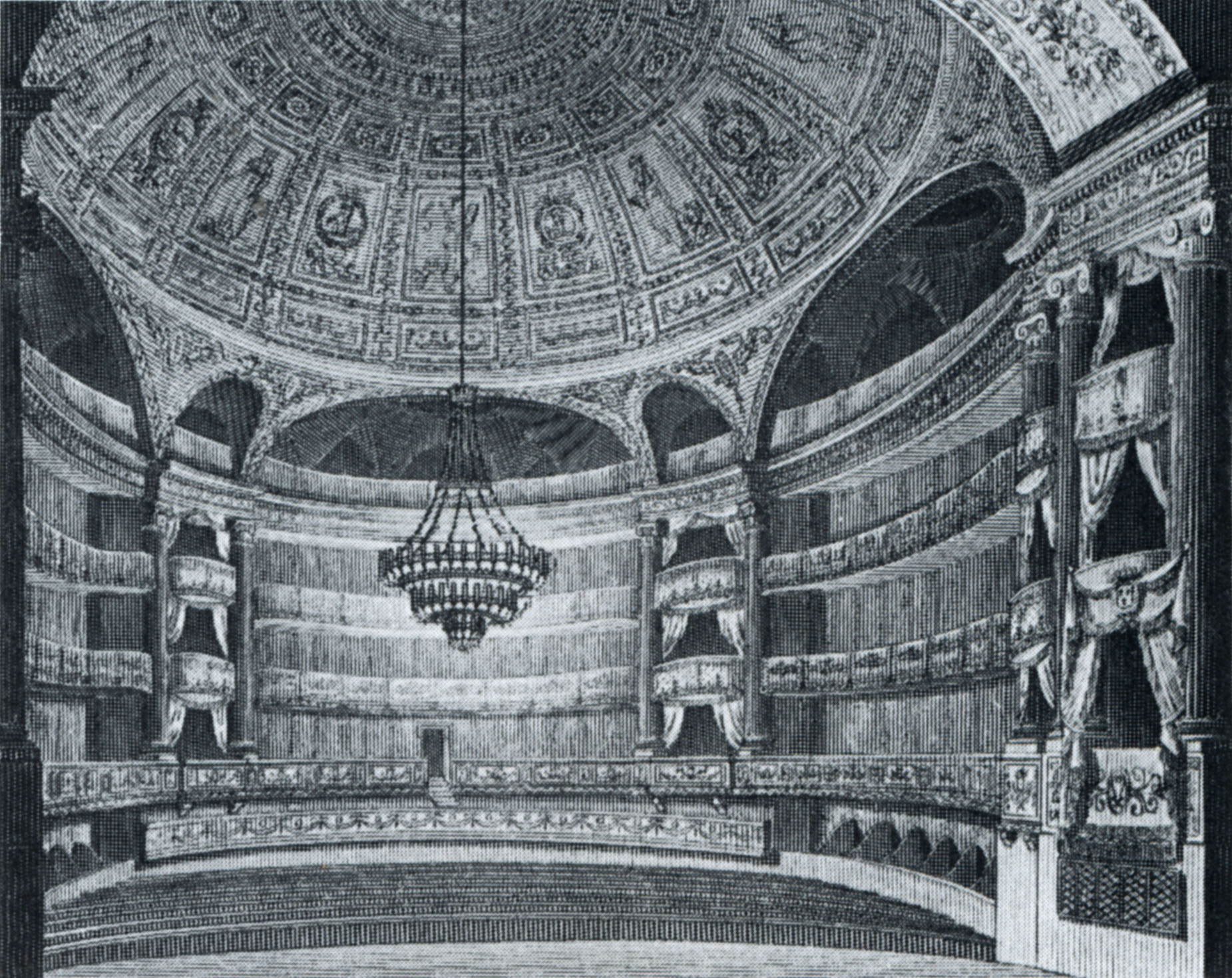
Auditorium of the Théâtre-National

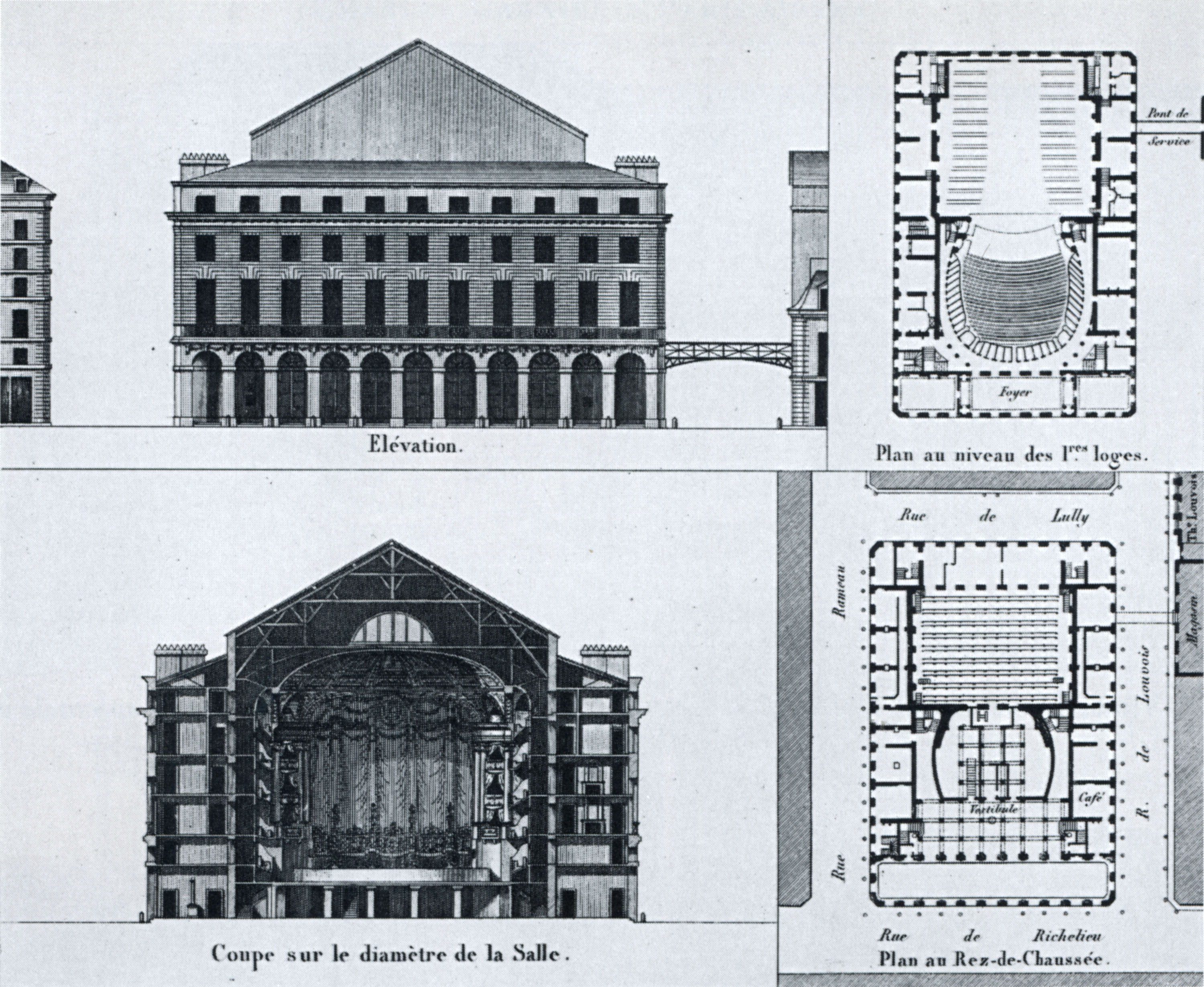
Architectural drawings of the Théâtre-National

== Bibliography ==
- Ayers, Andrew (2004). The Architecture of Paris. Stuttgart; London: Edition Axel Menges. ISBN 9783930698967.
- Braham, Allan (1980). The Architecture of the French Enlightenment. Berkeley: University of California Press. ISBN 9780520067394.
- Croizier, Laurent; Bourrousse, Luc (2011). The Grand-Théâtre of Bordeaux. Bordeaux: Festin. ISBN 9782360620401.
- Fletcher, Banister (1961). A History of Architecture on the Comparative Method, 17th edition, edited by R. A. Cordingley. London: The Athlone Press. OCLC 561038671. 1963 reprint: OCLC 859646659. Copy at Internet Archive.
- John, Richard (1998). "Louis, Victor [Louis-Nicolas]" in Turner 1998, vol. 19, pp. 725–726.
- Lacouture, Jean (1994). Le Grand-Théâtre de Bordeaux, ou L’Opéra des Vendanges, photographs by Dominique Thillard. Paris: Caisse nationale des monuments historiques et des sites. ISBN 9782858221257.
- Marionneau, Charles (1881). Victor Louis, Architecte du Théâtre de Bordeaux: Sa vie, ses travaux et sa correspondance 1731–1800. Bordeaux: G. Gounouilhou View at Google Books..
- Prudent, Henri; Guadet, Paul (1903). Les salles de spectacle construites par Victor Louis à Bordeaux, au Palais-Royal et à la place Louvois. Paris: Librairie de la construction moderne. OCLC 7065687.
- Turner, Jane, editor (1998). The Dictionary of Art, reprinted with minor corrections, 34 volumes. New York: Grove. ISBN 9781884446009.
