= Saint-André-de-Cubzac =

- Commune
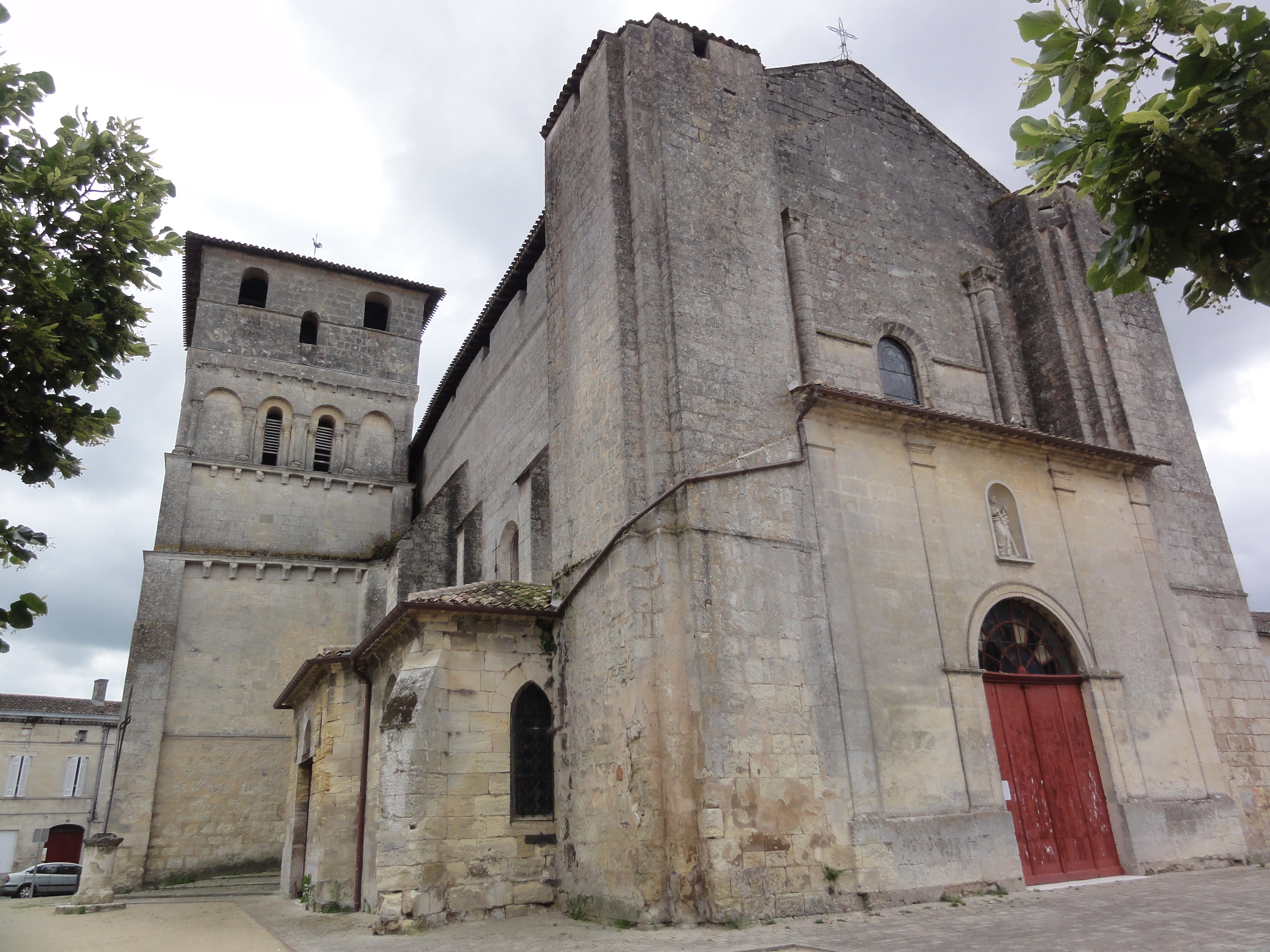
- Church of Saint-André

- Coat of arms
- Location of Saint-André-de-Cubzac
- Location within France Location within Nouvelle-Aquitaine
- Coordinates: 44°59′44″N 0°26′41″W
- Country: France
- Region: Nouvelle-Aquitaine
- Department: Gironde
- Arrondissement: Blaye
- Canton: Le Nord-Gironde

Government
  - Mayor (2020–2026): Célia Monseigne
- Area^{1}: 23.15 km^{2} (8.94 sq mi)
- Elevation: 30 m (98 ft)
- Highest elevation: 73 m (240 ft)
- Lowest elevation: 2 m (6.6 ft)
- Population (2023): 12,626
  - Density: 545.4/km^{2} (1,413/sq mi)
- Time zone: UTC+01:00 (CET)
  - Summer (DST): UTC+02:00 (CEST)
- INSEE/Postal code: 33366 /33240
- ^{1} French Land Register data, which excludes lakes, ponds, glaciers > 1 km^{2} (0.386 sq mi or 247 acres) and river estuaries.

Saint-André-de-Cubzac (French pronunciation: [sɛ̃t‿ɑ̃dʁe də kybzak], literally Saint Andrew of Cubzac; Occitan: Sent Andreus de Cubzac, Gascon: Sent Andriu de Cubzac) is a commune in the Gironde department, Nouvelle-Aquitaine, southwestern France.

Its inhabitants are called Cubzaguais in French.

== Population ==
Historical population

Year	Pop.	±% p.a.
1793	2,800	—
1800	5,279	+9.48%
1806	2,828	−9.88%
1821	3,087	+0.59%
1831	2,957	−0.43%
1836	3,329	+2.40%
1841	3,010	−1.99%
1846	3,327	+2.02%
1851	3,389	+0.37%
1856	3,432	+0.25%
1861	3,690	+1.46%
1866	3,611	−0.43%
1872	3,505	−0.50%
1876	3,543	+0.27%
1881	3,540	−0.02%
1886	3,737	+1.09%
1891	3,884	+0.77%
1896	3,916	+0.16%
1901	4,091	+0.88%

Year	Pop.	±% p.a.
1906	4,023	−0.33%
1911	4,019	−0.02%
1921	3,924	−0.24%
1926	3,974	+0.25%
1931	4,054	+0.40%
1936	3,641	−2.13%
1946	3,459	−0.51%
1954	3,945	+1.66%
1962	4,238	+0.90%
1968	4,572	+1.27%
1975	4,984	+1.24%
1982	5,243	+0.73%
1990	6,341	+2.41%
1999	7,234	+1.47%
2007	8,458	+1.97%
2012	10,155	+3.72%
2017	11,464	+2.45%
2023	12,626	+1.62%

Source: EHESS and INSEE (1968–2023)

== Notable residents ==
Jacques-Yves Cousteau (1910–1997) was born in Saint-André-de-Cubzac and is buried in the Cousteau family plot.

It is also the birthplace of Jean Marie Antoine de Lanessan.

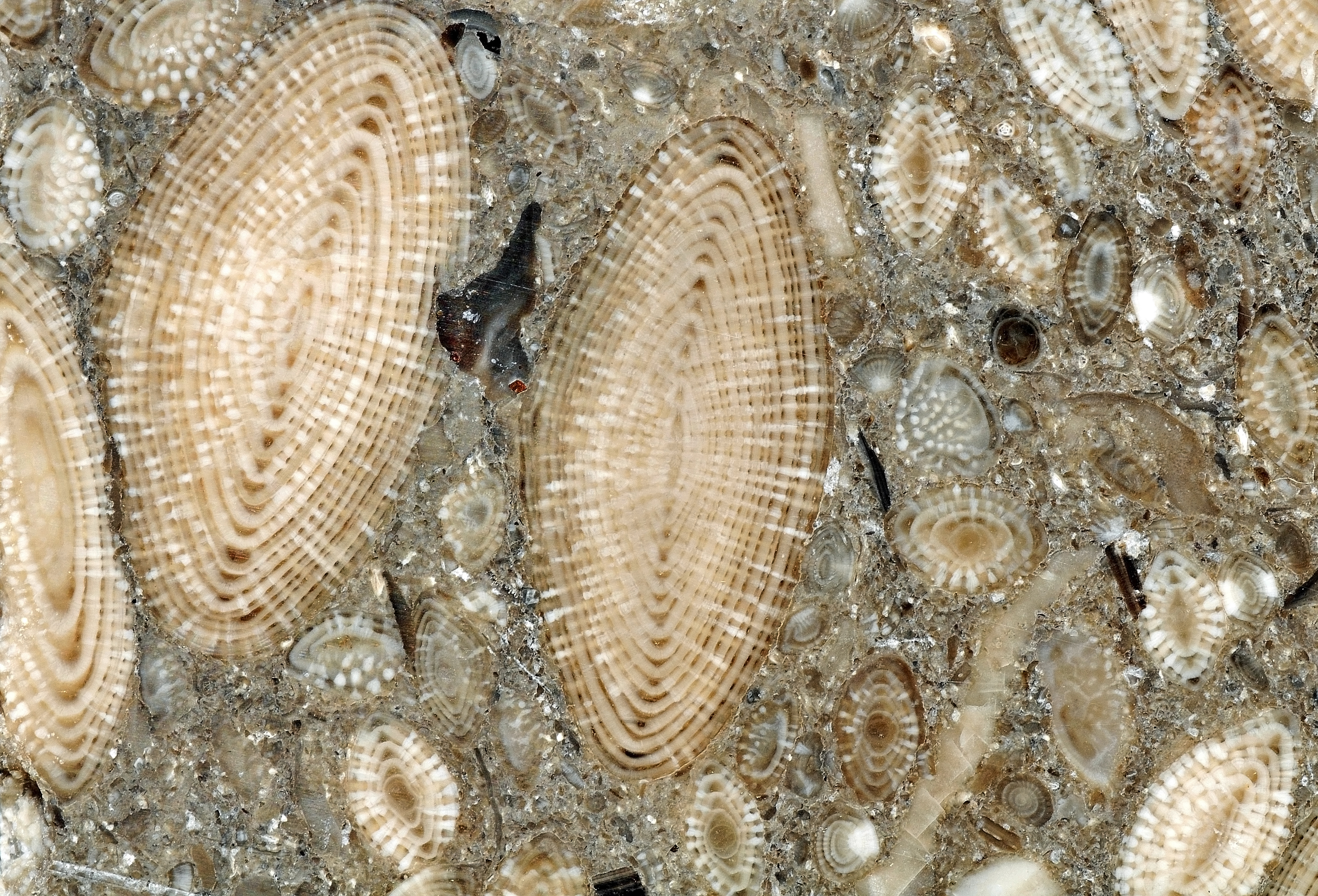
Fossil Nummulites found near Saint-André-de-Cubzac.

== See also ==
- Communes of the Gironde department
