= Richard Boudet =

Richard Boudet (2 March 1958, Antananarivo – 26 August 1995, Saint-Affrique) was a French archeologist who worked at the French National Centre for Scientific Research. He specialized in the French region of Aquitaine.

== Books ==
- Rituels des celtes d'Aquitaine, 1997
- Rituels celtes d'Aquitaine, 1996
- Monnaies gauloises à la croix, 1997
- L'Âge du fer récent dans la partie méridionale de l'estuaire girondin, 1997
