= Challenger Deep =

Deepest known point of Earth's seabed

- Location within Earth
- Interactive map of Challenger Deep
- Location: Mariana Trench
- Coordinates: 11°22.4′N 142°35.5′E
- Ocean/sea sources: Pacific Ocean
- Managing agency: Federated States of Micronesia
- Max. depth: 10,935 ± 6 m (35,876 ± 20 ft) below sea level

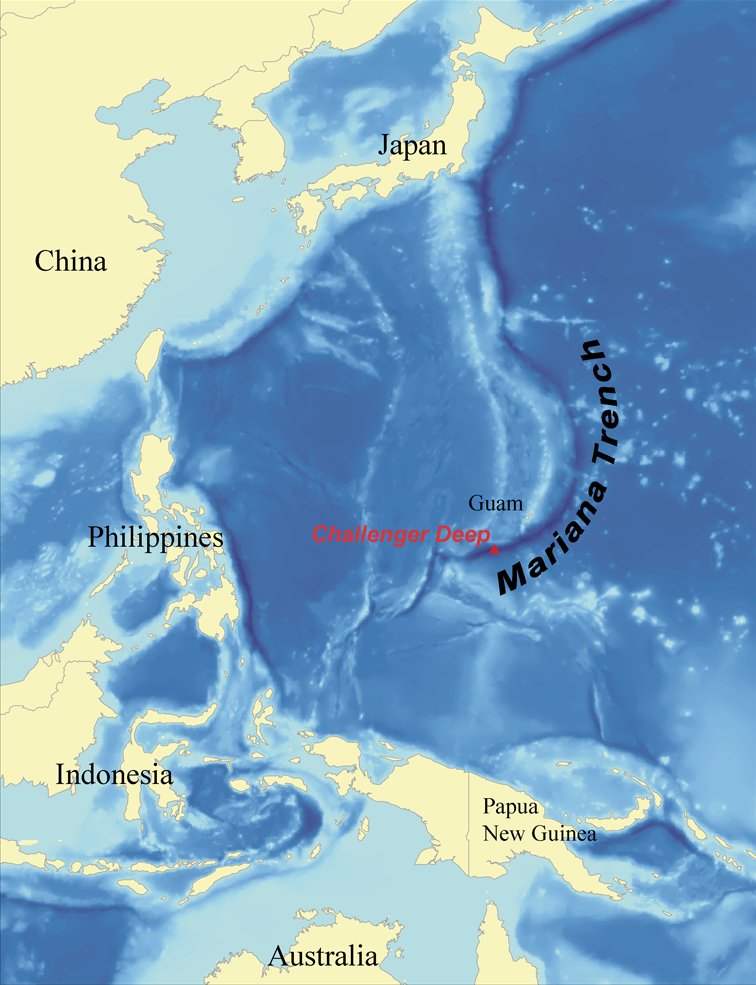
Location of Challenger Deep within the Mariana Trench and western Pacific Ocean

The Challenger Deep is the deepest known point of the seabed of Earth, located in the western Pacific Ocean at the southern end of the Mariana Trench, in the ocean territory of the Federated States of Micronesia.

The GEBCO Gazetteer of Undersea Feature Names indicates that the feature is situated at 11°22.4′N 142°35.5′E and has an approximated maximum depth of 5,962 to 6,020 fathoms (10,903 to 11,009 m; 35,772 to 36,120 ft) below sea level. A 2011 study placed the depth at 5,971 ± 5 fathoms (10,920 ± 9 m; 35,826 ± 30 ft) with a 2021 study revising the value to 10,935 ± 6 m (35,876 ± 20 ft) at a 95% confidence level.

The depression is named after the British Royal Navy survey ships HMS Challenger, whose expedition of 1872–1876 first located it, and HMS Challenger II, whose expedition of 1950–1952 established its record-setting depth. The first descent by any vehicle was conducted by the United States Navy using the bathyscaphe Trieste in January 1960. As of July 2022, there were 27 people who have descended to the Challenger Deep.

== Topography ==
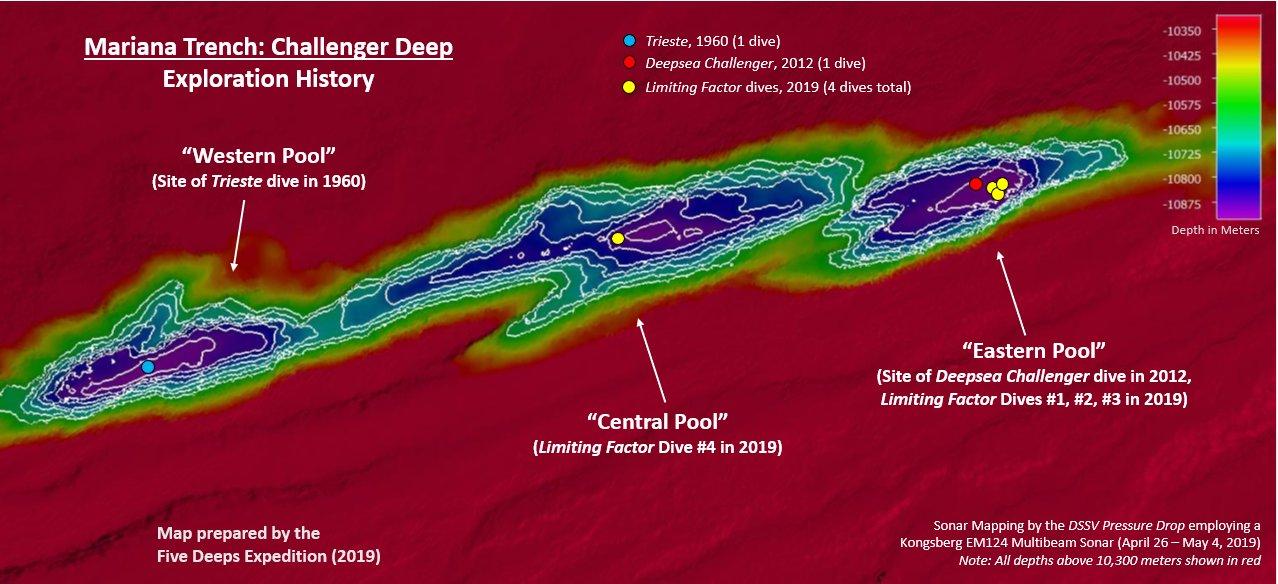
Sonar mapping of the Challenger Deep by the DSSV Pressure Drop employing a Kongsberg SIMRAD EM124 multibeam echosounder system (26 April – 4 May 2019)

The Challenger Deep is a relatively small slot-shaped depression in the bottom of a considerably larger crescent-shaped oceanic trench, which itself is an unusually deep feature in the ocean floor. The Challenger Deep consists of three basins, each six to ten kilometres (3.7 to 6.2 mi) long, 2 kilometres (1.2 mi) wide, and over 5,930 fathoms (10,840 m; 35,580 ft) in depth, oriented in echelon from west to east, separated by mounds between the basins 200 to 300 metres (660 to 980 ft) higher. The three basins feature extends about 48 kilometres (30 mi) west to east if measured at the 10,650-metre (34,940 ft) isobath. Both the western and eastern basins have recorded depths (by sonar bathymetry) in excess of 10,920 metres (35,827 ft), while the center basin is slightly less deep. The closest land to the Challenger Deep is Fais Island (one of the outer islands of Yap), 155 nautical miles (287 km; 178 mi) southwest, and Guam, 164 nautical miles (304 km; 189 mi) to the northeast. Detailed sonar mapping of the western, center and eastern basins in June 2020 by the DSSV Pressure Drop combined with manned descents revealed that they undulate with slopes and piles of rocks above a bed of pelagic ooze. This conforms with the description of Challenger Deep as consisting of an elongated seabed section with distinct sub-basins or sediment-filled pools.

=== Tectonics ===
The topography above is explained by the complex subduction of tectonic plates.

== Ecology ==
The summary report of the HMS Challenger expedition lists unicellular life forms from two dredged samples, taken when the Challenger Deep was first discovered. These (Nassellaria and Spumellaria) were reported in the Report on Radiolaria (1887) written by Ernst Haeckel.

On their 1960 descent, the crew of the Trieste noted that the floor consisted of diatomaceous ooze and reported observing "some type of flatfish" lying on the seabed.

And as we were settling this final fathom, I saw a wonderful thing. Lying on the bottom just beneath us was some type of flatfish, resembling a sole, about 1 foot [30 cm] long and 6 inches [15 cm] across. Even as I saw him, his two round eyes on top of his head spied us – a monster of steel – invading his silent realm. Eyes? Why should he have eyes? Merely to see phosphorescence? The floodlight that bathed him was the first real light ever to enter this hadal realm. Here, in an instant, was the answer that biologists had asked for the decades. Could life exist in the greatest depths of the ocean? It could! And not only that, here apparently, was a true, bony teleost fish, not a primitive ray or elasmobranch. Yes, a highly evolved vertebrate, in time's arrow very close to man himself. Slowly, extremely slowly, this flatfish swam away. Moving along the bottom, partly in the ooze and partly in the water, he disappeared into his night. Slowly too – perhaps everything is slow at the bottom of the sea – Walsh and I shook hands.

Many marine biologists are now skeptical of this supposed sighting, and it is suggested the sighted creature may instead have been a sea cucumber which is known to live at such depths and might be confused for a sole. The video camera on board the Kaiko probe spotted a sea cucumber, a scale worm and a shrimp at the bottom. At the bottom of the Challenger Deep, the Nereus probe spotted one polychaete worm (a multi-legged predator) about an inch long.

An analysis of the sediment samples collected by Kaiko found large numbers of simple organisms at 10,900 m (35,800 ft). While similar lifeforms have been known to exist in shallower ocean trenches (> 7,000 m) and on the abyssal plain, the lifeforms discovered in the Challenger Deep possibly represent taxa distinct from those in shallower ecosystems.

Most of the organisms collected were simple, soft-shelled foraminifera (432 species according to National Geographic), with four of the others representing species of the complex, multi-chambered genera Leptohalysis and Reophax. Eighty-five per cent of the specimens were organic, soft-shelled allogromiids, which is unusual compared to samples of sediment-dwelling organisms from other deep-sea environments, where the percentage of organic-walled foraminifera ranges from 5% to 20%. As small organisms with hard, calcareous shells have trouble growing at extreme depths because of the high solubility of calcium carbonate in the pressurized water, scientists theorize that the prevalence of soft-shelled organisms in the Challenger Deep may have resulted from the typical biosphere present when the Challenger Deep was shallower than it is now. Over the course of six to nine million years, as the Challenger Deep grew to its present depth, many of the species present in the sediment died out or were unable to adapt to the increasing water pressure and changing environment.

On 17 March 2013, researchers reported data that suggested piezophilic microorganisms thrive in the Challenger Deep. Other researchers reported related studies that microbes thrive inside rocks up to 579 m (1,900 ft) below the sea floor under 2,591 m (8,500 ft) of ocean off the coast of the northwestern United States.

== Study of the depth and location of the Challenger Deep ==
Since May 2000, with the help of non-degraded signal satellite navigation, civilian surface vessels equipped with professional dual-frequency capable satellite navigation equipment can measure and establish their geodetic position with an accuracy in the order of meters to tens of meters whilst the western, central and eastern basins are kilometers apart.

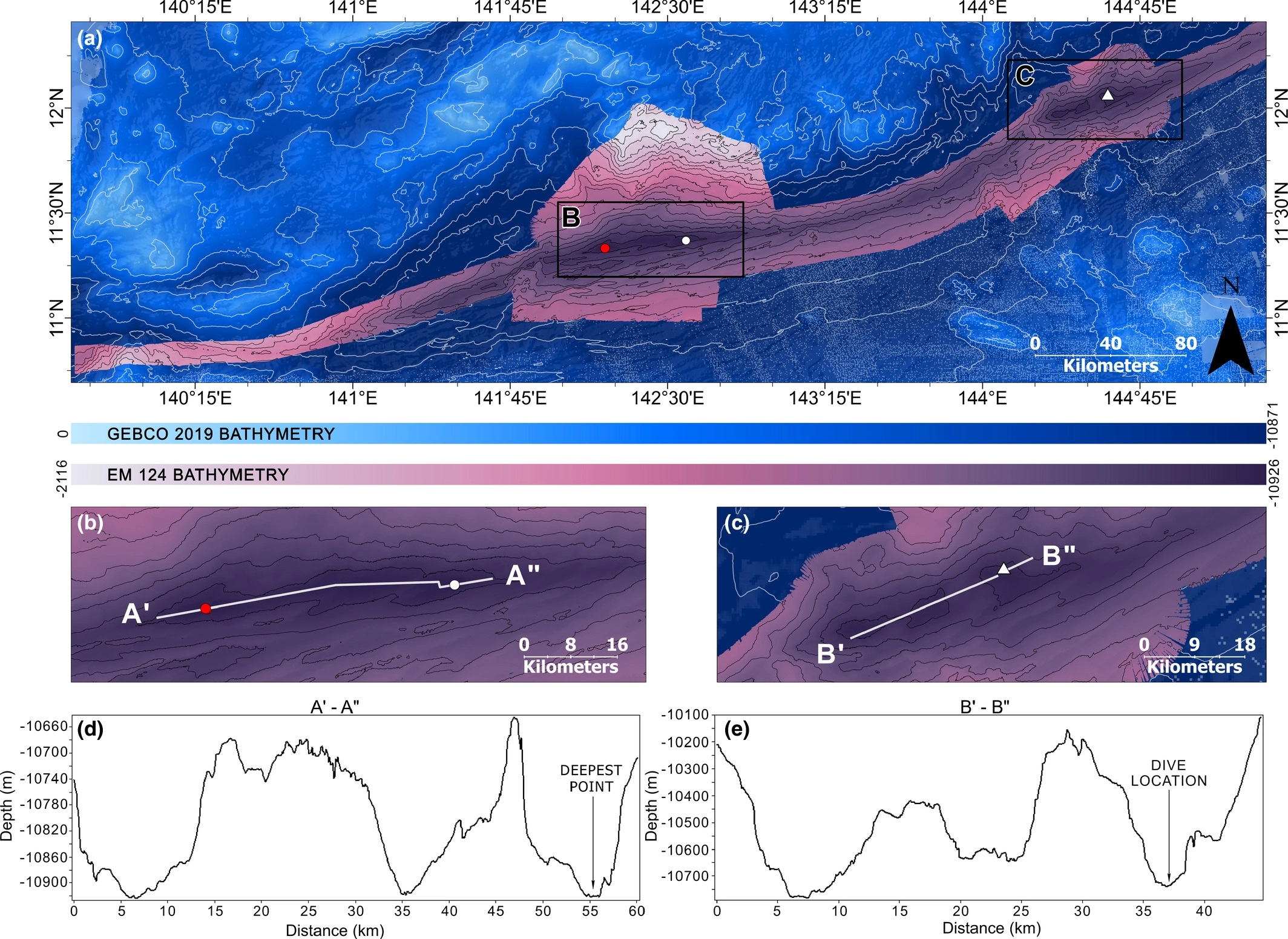
GEBCO 2019 bathymetry of the Challenger Deep and Sirena Deep. (a) Mariana Trench multibeam bathymetry data gridded at 75 m acquired on-board the DSSV Pressure Drop overtop the GEBCO 2019 source grid (as shown in Figure 1) and the complete GEBCO 2019 grid with hillshade. EM 124 black contours at 500 m intervals, GEBCO 2019 grey contours at 1,000 m intervals. The white circle indicates the deepest point and submersible dive location, the white triangle indicates the submersible dive location from Sirena Deep, the red spot was the deepest point derived by van Haren et al., (2017). (b) Challenger Deep. (c) Sirena Deep. Bathymetric cross sections A'–A" and B'–B" over Challenger Deep and Sirena Deep displayed in (d) and (e), respectively.

In 2014, a study was conducted regarding the determination of the depth and location of the Challenger Deep based on data collected previous to and during the 2010 sonar mapping of the Mariana Trench with a Kongsberg Maritime EM 122 multibeam echosounder system aboard USNS Sumner. This study by James. V. Gardner et al. of the Center for Coastal & Ocean Mapping-Joint Hydrographic Center (CCOM/JHC), Chase Ocean Engineering Laboratory of the University of New Hampshire splits the measurement attempt history into three main groups: early single-beam echo sounders (1950s–1970s), early multibeam echo sounders (1980s – 21st century), and modern (i.e., post-GPS, high-resolution) multibeam echo sounders. Taking uncertainties in depth measurements and position estimation into account, the raw data of the 2010 bathymetry of the Challenger Deep vicinity consisting of 2,051,371 soundings from eight survey lines was analyzed. The study concludes that with the best of 2010 multibeam echosounder technologies after the analysis a depth uncertainty of ±25 m (82 ft) (95% confidence level) on 9 degrees of freedom and a positional uncertainty of ±20 to 25 m (66 to 82 ft) (2drms) remain and the location of the deepest depth recorded in the 2010 mapping is 10,984 m (36,037 ft) at 11.329903°N 142.199305°E. The depth measurement uncertainty is a composite of measured uncertainties in the spatial variations in sound-speed through the water volume, the ray-tracing and bottom-detection algorithms of the multibeam system, the accuracies and calibration of the motion sensor and navigation systems, estimates of spherical spreading, attenuation throughout the water volume, and so forth.

Both the RV Sonne expedition in 2016, and the RV Sally Ride expedition in 2019 expressed strong reservations concerning the depth corrections applied by the Gardner et al. study of 2014, and serious doubt concerning the accuracy of the deepest depth calculated by Gardner (in the western basin), of 10,984 m (36,037 ft) after analysis of their multibeam data on a 100 m (328 ft) grid. Dr. Hans van Haren, chief scientist on the RV Sally Ride cruise SR1916, indicated that Gardner's calculations were 69 m (226 ft) too deep due to the "sound velocity profiling by Gardner et al. (2014)."

In 2018-2019, the deepest points of each ocean were mapped using a full-ocean depth Kongsberg EM 124 multibeam echosounder aboard DSSV Pressure Drop. In 2021, a data paper was published by Cassandra Bongiovanni, Heather A. Stewart and Alan J. Jamieson regarding the gathered data donated to GEBCO. The deepest depth recorded in the 2019 Challenger Deep sonar mapping was 10,924 m (35,840 ft) ±15 m (49 ft) at 11.369°N 142.587°E in the eastern basin. This depth closely agrees with the deepest point (10,925 m (35,843 ft) ±12 m (39 ft)) determined by the Van Haren et al. sonar bathymetry. The geodetic position of the deepest depth according to the Van Haren et al. significantly differs (about 42 km (26 mi) to the west) with the 2021 paper. After post-processing the initial depth estimates by application of a full-ocean depth sound velocity profile Bongiovanni et al. report an (almost) as deep point at 11.331°N 142.205°E in the western basin that geodetically differs about 350 m (1,150 ft) with the deepest point position determined by Van Haren et al. (11.332417°N 142.20205°E in the western basin). After analysis of their multibeam data on a 75 m (246 ft) grid, the Bongiovanni et al. 2021 paper states the technological accuracy does not currently exist on low-frequency ship-mounted sonars required to determine which location was truly the deepest, nor does it currently exist on deep-sea pressure sensors.

In 2021, a study by Samuel F. Greenaway, Kathryn D. Sullivan, Samuel H. Umfress, Alice B. Beittel and Karl D. Wagner was published presenting a revised estimate of the maximum depth of the Challenger Deep based on a series of submersible dives conducted in June 2020. These depth estimates are derived from acoustic echo sounding profiles referenced to in-situ direct pressure measurements and corrected for observed oceanographic properties of the water-column, atmospheric pressure, gravity and gravity-gradient anomalies, and water-level effects. The study concludes according to their calculations the deepest observed seafloor depth was 10,935 m (35,876 ft) ±6 m (20 ft) below mean sea level at a 95% confidence level at 11°22.3′N 142°35.3′E in the eastern basin. For this estimate, the error term is dominated by the uncertainty of the employed pressure sensor, but Greenaway et al. show that the gravity correction is also substantial. The Greenaway et al. study compares its results with other recent acoustic and pressure-based measurements for the Challenger Deep and concludes the deepest depth in the western basin is very nearly as deep as the eastern basin. The disagreement between the maximum depth estimates and their geodetic positions between post-2000 published depths however exceed the accompanying margins of uncertainty, raising questions regarding the measurements or the reported uncertainties.

Another 2021 paper by Scott Loranger, David Barclay and Michael Buckingham, besides a December 2014 implosion shock wave based depth estimate of 10,983 m (36,033 ft), which is among the deepest estimated depths, also treatises the differences between various maximum depth estimates and their geodetic positions.

=== Direct measurements ===
The 2010 maximal sonar mapping depths reported by Gardner et al. in 2014 and Greenaway et al. study in 2021 have not been confirmed by direct descent (pressure gauge/manometer) measurements at full-ocean depth. Expeditions have reported direct measured maximal depths in a narrow range.

- For the western basin deepest depths were reported as 10,913 m (35,804 ft) by Trieste in 1960 and 10,923 m (35,837 ft) ±4 m (13 ft) by DSV Limiting Factor in June 2020.
- For the central basin the greatest reported depth is 10,915 m (35,810 ft) ±4 m (13 ft) by DSV Limiting Factor in June 2020.
- For the eastern basin deepest depths were reported as 10,911 m (35,797 ft) by Kaikō ROV in 1995, 10,902 m (35,768 ft) by ROV Nereus in 2009, 10,908 m (35,787 ft) by Deepsea Challenger in 2012, 10,929 m (35,856 ft) by benthic lander "Leggo" in May 2019, and 10,925 m (35,843 ft) ±4 m (13 ft) by DSV Limiting Factor in May 2019.

== Surveys and bathymetry ==
Over many years, the search for, and investigation of, the location of the maximum depth of the world's oceans has involved many different vessels, and continues into the twenty-first century.

The accuracy of determining geographical location, and the beamwidth of (multibeam) echosounder systems, limits the horizontal and vertical bathymetric sensor resolution that hydrographers can obtain from onsite data. This is especially important when sounding in deep water, as the resulting footprint of an acoustic pulse gets large once it reaches a distant sea floor. Further, sonar operation is affected by variations in sound speed, particularly in the vertical plane. The speed is determined by the water's bulk modulus, mass, and density. The bulk modulus is affected by temperature, pressure, and dissolved impurities (usually salinity).

=== 1875 – HMS Challenger ===
In 1875, during her transit from the Admiralty Islands in the Bismarck Archipelago to Yokohama in Japan, the three-masted sailing corvette HMS Challenger attempted to make landfall at Spanish Marianas (now Guam), but was set to the west by "baffling winds" preventing her crew from "visiting either the Carolines or the Ladrones." Their altered path took them over the undersea canyon which later became known as the Challenger Deep. Depth soundings were taken by Baillie-weighted marked rope, and geographical locations were determined by celestial navigation (to an estimated accuracy of two nautical miles (3.7 km; 2.3 mi)). One of their samples was taken within fifteen miles of the deepest spot in all of Earth's oceans. On 23 March 1875, at sample station number #225, HMS Challenger recorded the bottom at 4,475 fathoms (26,850 ft; 8,184 m) deep, (the deepest sounding of her three-plus-year eastward circumnavigation of the Earth) at 11°24′N 143°16′E – and confirmed it with a second sounding at the same location. The Challenger expedition was the first major scientific expedition devoted entirely to the emerging science of oceanography, and the unlikely but serendipitous discovery of Earth's deepest depression was incredibly good fortune. For comparison, Earth's third deepest site (the Sirena Deep only 150 nautical miles east of the Challenger Deep), would remain undiscovered for another 122 years.

=== 1951 – SV HMS Challenger II ===
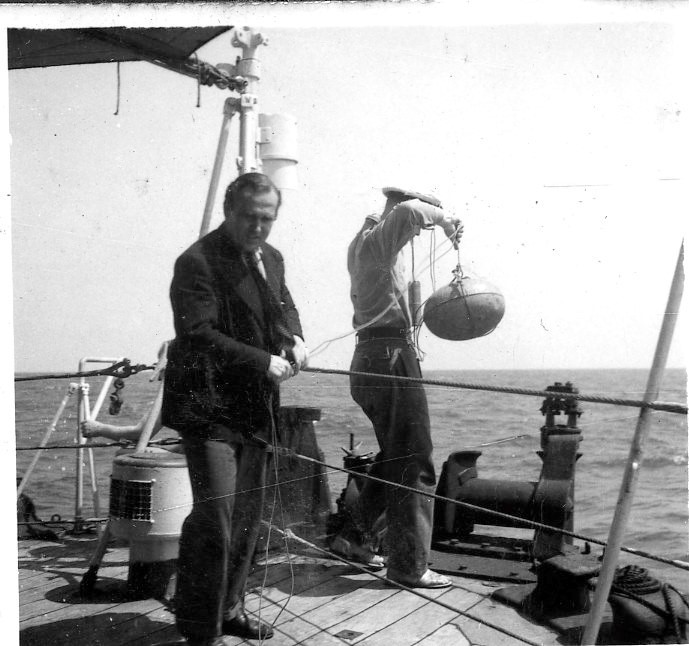
Chief Scientist Tom Gaskell, left, aboard HMS Challenger II, 1951

Seventy-five years later, the 1,140-ton British survey vessel HMS Challenger II, on her three-year westward circumnavigation of Earth, investigated the extreme depths southwest of Guam reported in 1875 by her predecessor, HMS Challenger. On her southbound track from Japan to New Zealand (May–July 1951), Challenger II conducted a survey of the Marianas Trench between Guam and Ulithi atoll, using seismic-sized bomb-soundings and recorded a maximum depth of 5,663 fathoms (33,978 ft; 10,356 m). The depth was beyond Challenger II's echo sounder capability to verify, so they resorted to using a taut wire with "140 lbs of scrap iron", and documented a depth of 5,899 fathoms (35,394 ft; 10,788 m). The Senior Scientist aboard Challenger II, Thomas Gaskell, recalled:

[I]t took from ten past five in the evening until twenty to seven, that is an hour and a half, for the iron weight to fall to the sea-bottom. It was almost dark by the time the weight struck, but great excitement greeted the reading...

In New Zealand, the Challenger II team gained the assistance of the Royal New Zealand Dockyard, "who managed to boost the echo sounder to record at the greatest depths". They returned to the "Marianas Deep" (sic) in October 1951. Using their newly improved echo sounder, they ran survey lines at right angles to the axis of the trench and discovered "a considerable area of a depth greater than 5,900 fathoms (35,400 ft; 10,790 m)" – later identified as the Challenger Deep's western basin. The greatest depth recorded was 5,940 fathoms (35,640 ft; 10,863 m), at 11°19′N 142°15′E. Navigational accuracy of several hundred meters was attained by celestial navigation and LORAN-A. As Gaskell explained, the measurement

was not more than 50 miles from the spot where the nineteenth-century Challenger found her deepest depth [...] and it may be thought fitting that a ship with the name Challenger should put the seal on the work of that great pioneering expedition of oceanography.

The term "Challenger Deep" came into use after this 1951–52 Challenger circumnavigation, and commemorates both British ships of that name involved with the discovery of the deepest basin of the world's oceans.

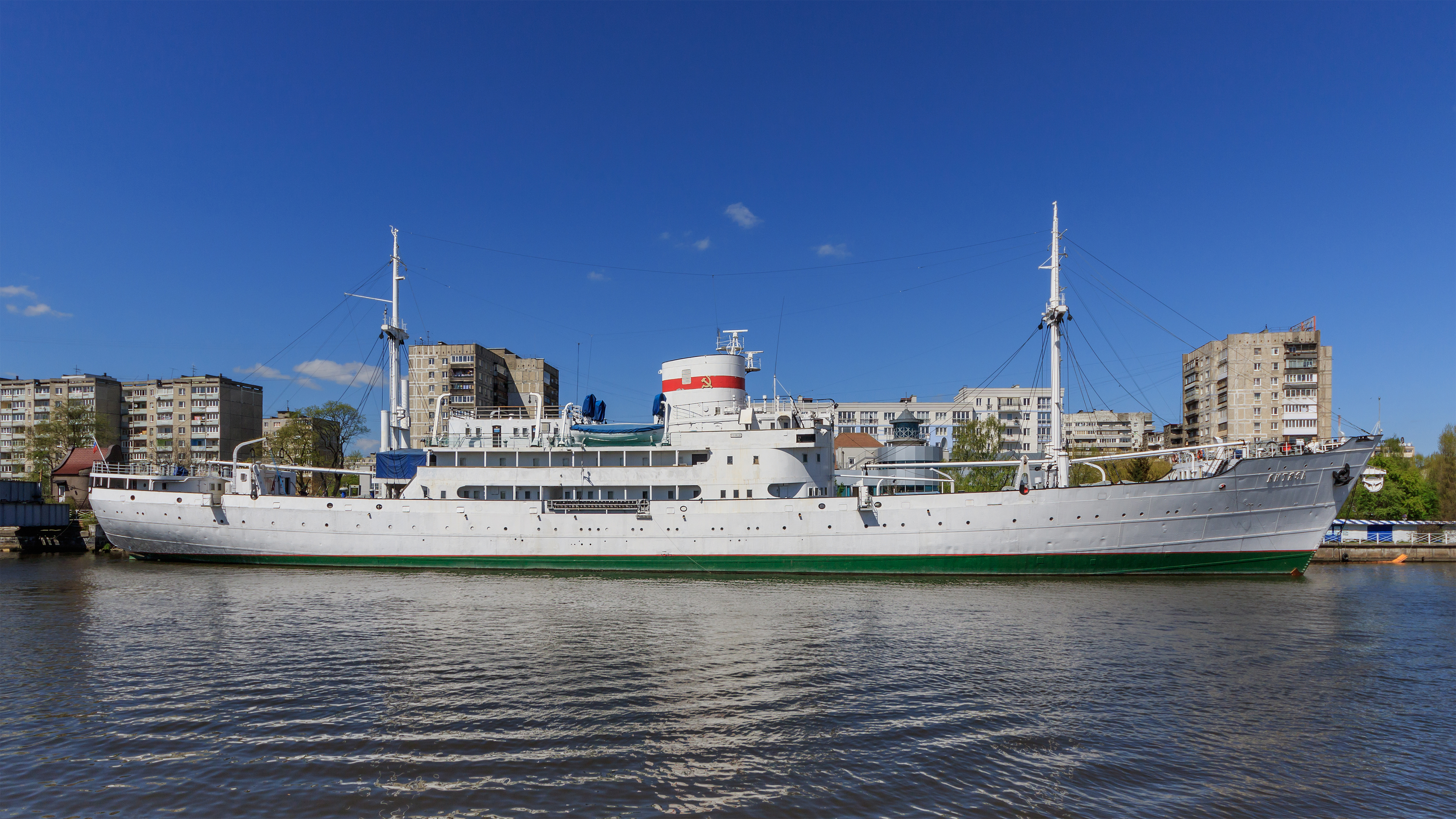
Research vessel Vityaz in Kaliningrad "Museum of world ocean"

=== 1957–1958 – RV Vityaz ===
In August 1957, the Soviet 3,248-ton Vernadsky Institute of Geochemistry research vessel Vityaz recorded a maximum depth of 6,033 ± 27 fathoms (36,198 ± 162 ft; 11,033 ± 49 m) at 11°20.9′N 142°11.5′E in the western basin of the Challenger Deep during a brief transit of the area on Cruise #25. She returned in 1958, Cruise #27, to conduct a detailed single beam bathymetry survey involving over a dozen transects of the Deep, with an extensive examination of the western basin and a quick peek into the eastern basin. Fisher records a total of three Vityaz sounding locations on Figure 2 "Trenches" (1963), one within yards of the 142°11.5' E location, and a third at 11°20.0′N 142°07′E, all with a 6,033 ± 27-fathom (36,198 ± 162 ft; 11,033 ± 49 m) depth. The depths were considered statistical outliers, and a depth greater than 11,000 metres has never been proven. Taira reports that if Vityaz's depth was corrected with the same methodology used by the Japanese RV Hakuho Maru expedition of December 1992, it would be presented as 10,983 ± 50 metres (36,033 ± 164 ft), as opposed to modern depths from multibeam echosounder systems greater than 10,900 metres (35,800 ft) with the NOAA accepted maximum of 10,995 ± 10 metres (36,073 ± 33 ft) in the western basin.

=== 1959 – RV Stranger ===
The first definitive verification of both the depth and location of the Challenger Deep (western basin) was determined by Dr. R. L. Fisher from the Scripps Institution of Oceanography, aboard the 325-ton research vessel Stranger. Using explosive soundings, they recorded 10,850 ± 20 metres (35,597 ± 66 ft) at/near 11°18′N 142°14′E in July 1959. Stranger used celestial and LORAN-C for navigation. LORAN-C navigation provided geographical accuracy of 460 m (1,509 ft) or better. According to another source RV Stranger using bomb-sounding surveyed a maximum depth of 10,915 ± 10 metres (5,968.4 ± 5.5 fathoms; 35,810 ± 33 ft) at 11°20.0′N 142°11.8′E. Discrepancies between the geographical location (lat/long) of Stranger's deepest depths and those from earlier expeditions (Challenger II 1951; Vityaz 1957 and 1958) "are probably due to uncertainties in fixing the ships' positions". Stranger's north-south zig-zag survey passed well to the east of the eastern basin southbound, and well to the west of the eastern basin northbound, thus failed to discover the eastern basin of the Challenger Deep. The maximum depth measured near longitude 142°30'E was 10,760 ± 20 m (35,302 ± 66 ft), about 10 km west of the eastern basin's deepest point. This was an important gap in information, as the eastern basin was later reported as deeper than the other two basins. Stranger crossed the center basin twice, measuring a maximum depth of 10,830 ± 20 m (35,531 ± 66 ft) in the vicinity of 142°22'E. At the western end of the central basin (approximately 142°18'E), they recorded a depth of 10,805 ± 20 m (35,449 ± 66 ft). The western basin received four transects by Stranger, recording depths of 10,830 ± 20 m (35,531 ± 66 ft) toward the central basin, near where Trieste dived in 1960 (vicinity 11°18.5′N 142°15.5′E, and where Challenger II, in 1950, recorded 10,863 ± 35 m (35,640 ± 115 ft). At the far western end of the western basin (about 142°11'E), the Stranger recorded 10,850 ± 20 m (35,597 ± 66 ft), some 6 km south of the location where Vityaz recorded 11,034 ± 50 m (36,201 ± 164 ft) in 1957–1958. Fisher stated: "differences in the Vitiaz [sic] and Stranger–Challenger II depths can be attributed to the [sound] velocity correction function used". After investigating the Challenger Deep, Stranger proceeded to the Philippine Trench and transected the trench over twenty times in August 1959, finding a maximum depth of 10,030 ± 10 m (32,907 ± 33 ft), and thus established that the Challenger Deep was about 800 metres (2,600 ft) deeper than the Philippine Trench. The 1959 Stranger surveys of the Challenger Deep and of the Philippine Trench informed the U.S. Navy as to the appropriate site for Trieste's record dive in 1960.

=== 1962 – RV Spencer F. Baird ===
The Proa Expedition, Leg 2, returned Fisher to the Challenger Deep on 12–13 April 1962 aboard the Scripps research vessel Spencer F. Baird (formerly the steel-hulled US Army large tug LT-581) and employed a Precision Depth Recorder (PDR) to verify the extreme depths previously reported. They recorded a maximum depth of 10,915 metres (35,810 ft) (location not available). Additionally, at location "H-4" in the Challenger Deep, the expedition cast three taut-wire soundings: on 12 April, the first cast was to 5,078 fathoms (corrected for wire angle) 9,287 metres (30,469 ft) at 11°23′N 142°19.5′E in the central basin (Up until 1965, US research vessels recorded soundings in fathoms). The second cast, also on 12 April, was to 5,000^{+} fathoms at 11°20.5′N 142°22.5′E in the central basin. On 13 April, the final cast recorded 5,297 fathoms (corrected for wire angle) 9,687 metres (31,781 ft) at 11°17.5′N 142°11′E (the western basin). They were chased off by a hurricane after only two days on-site. Once again, Fisher entirely missed the eastern basin of the Challenger Deep, which later proved to contain the deepest depths.

=== 1975–1980 – RV Thomas Washington ===
The Scripps Institution of Oceanography deployed the 1,490-ton Navy-owned, civilian-crewed research vessel Thomas Washington (AGOR-10) to the Mariana Trench on several expeditions from 1975 to 1986. The first of these was the Eurydice Expedition, Leg 8 which brought Fisher back to the Challenger Deep's western basin from 28 to 31 March 1975. Thomas Washington established geodetic positioning by (SATNAV) with Autolog Gyro and EM Log. Bathymetrics were by a 12 kHz Precision Depth Recorder (PDR) with a single 60° beam. They mapped one, "possibly two", axial basins with a depth of 10,915 ± 20 m (35,810 ± 66 ft). Five dredges were hauled 27–31 March, all into or slightly north of the deepest depths of the western basin. Fisher noted that this survey of the Challenger Deep (western basin) had "provided nothing to support and much to refute recent claims of depths there greater than 10,915 ± 20 m (35,810 ± 66 ft)." While Fisher missed the eastern basin of the Challenger Deep (for the third time), he did report a deep depression about 150 nautical miles east of the western basin. The 25 March dredge haul at 12°03.72′N 142°33.42′E encountered 10,015 metres (32,858 ft), which pre-shadowed by 22 years the discovery of HMRG Deep/Sirena Deep in 1997. The deepest waters of the HMRG Deep/Sirena Deep at 10,714 ± 20 m (35,151 ± 66 ft) are centered at/near 12°03.94′N 142°34.866′E, approximately 2.65 km from Fisher's 25 March 1975 10,015 metres (32,858 ft) dredge haul.

On Scripps Institution of Oceanography's INDOPAC Expedition Leg 3, the chief scientist, Dr. Joseph L. Reid, and oceanographer Arnold W. Mantyla made a hydrocast of a free vehicle (a special-purpose benthic lander (or "baited camera") for measurements of water temperature and salinity) on 27 May 1976 into the western basin of the Challenger Deep, "Station 21", at 11°19.9′N 142°10.8′E at about 10,840 metres (35,560 ft) depth. On INDOPAC Expedition Leg 9, under chief scientist A. Aristides Yayanos, Thomas Washington spent nine days from 13 to 21 January 1977 conducting an extensive and detailed investigation of the Challenger Deep, mainly with biological objectives. "Echo soundings were carried out primarily with a 3.5 KhZ single-beam system, with a 12KhZ echosounder operated in addition some of the time" (The 12 kHz system was activated for testing on 16 Jan). While the ship briefly visited the area of the eastern basin, the expedition did not recognize it as potentially the deepest of the three Challenger Deep basins.

Thomas Washington returned briefly to the Challenger Deep on 17–19 October 1978 during Mariana Expedition Leg 5 under chief scientist James W. Hawkins. The ship tracked to the south and west of the eastern basin, and recorded depths between 5,093 and 7,182 metres (16,709–23,563 ft). Another miss. On Mariana Expedition Leg 8, under chief scientist Yayanos, Thomas Washington was again involved, from 12 to 21 December 1978, with an intensive biological study of the western and central basins of the Challenger Deep. Fourteen traps and pressure-retaining traps were put down to depths ranging from 10,455 to 10,927 metres (34,301–35,850 ft); the greatest depth was at 11°20.0′N 142°11.8′E. All of the 10,900-plus m recordings were in the western basin. The 10,455 metres (34,301 ft) depth was furthest east at 142°26.4' E (in the central basin), about 17 km west of the eastern basin. Again, focused efforts on the known areas of extreme depths (the western and central basins) were so tight that the eastern basin again was missed by this expedition.

From 20 to 30 November 1980, Thomas Washington was on site at the western basin of the Challenger Deep, as part of Rama Expedition Leg 7, again with chief-scientist Dr. A. A. Yayanos. Yayanos directed Thomas Washington in arguably the most extensive and wide-ranging of all single-beam bathymetric examinations of the Challenger Deep ever undertaken, with dozens of transits of the western basin, and ranging far into the backarc of the Challenger Deep (northward), with significant excursions into the Pacific Plate (southward) and along the trench axis to the east. They hauled eight dredges in the western basin to depths ranging from 10,015 to 10,900 metres (32,858–35,761 ft), and between hauls, cast thirteen free vertical traps. The dredging and traps were for biological investigation of the bottom. In the first successful retrieval of a live animal from the Challenger Deep, on 21 November 1980 in the western basin at 11°18.7′N 142°11.6′E, Yayanos recovered a live amphipod from about 10,900 meters depth with a pressurized trap. Once again, other than a brief look into the eastern basin, all bathymetric and biological investigations were into the western basin.

=== 1976–1977 – RV Kana Keoki ===
Pacific plate subduction at the Challenger Deep

On Leg 3 of the Hawaii Institute of Geophysics' (HIG) expedition 76010303, the 156-foot (48 m) research vessel Kana Keoki departed Guam primarily for a seismic investigation of the Challenger Deep area, under chief scientist Donald M. Hussong. The ship was equipped with air guns (for seismic reflection soundings deep into the Earth's mantle), magnetometer, gravimeter, 3.5 kHz and 12 kHz sonar transducers, and precision depth recorders. They ran the Deep from east to west, collecting single beam bathymetry, magnetic and gravity measurements, and employed the air guns along the trench axis, and well into the backarc and forearc, from 13 to 15 March 1976. Thence they proceeded south to the Ontong Java Plateau. All three deep basins of the Challenger Deep were covered, but Kana Keoki recorded a maximum depth of 7,800 m (25,591 ft). Seismic information developed from this survey was instrumental in gaining an understanding of the subduction of the Pacific Plate under the Philippine Sea Plate. In 1977, Kana Keoki returned to the Challenger Deep area for wider coverage of the forearc and backarc.

=== 1984 – SV Takuyo ===
The Hydrographic Department, Maritime Safety Agency, Japan (JHOD) deployed the newly commissioned 2,600-ton survey vessel Takuyo (HL 02) to the Challenger Deep 17–19 February 1984. Takuyo was the first Japanese ship to be equipped with the new narrowbeam SeaBeam multi-beam sonar echosounder, and was the first survey ship with multi-beam capability to survey the Challenger Deep. The system was so new that JHOD had to develop their own software for drawing bathymetric charts based on the SeaBeam digital data. In just three days, they tracked 500 miles of sounding lines, and covered about 140 km^{2} of the Challenger Deep with multibeam ensonification. Under chief scientist Hideo Nishida, they used CTD temperature and salinity data from the top 4,500 metres (14,764 ft) of the water column to correct depth measurements, and later conferred with Scripps Institution of Oceanography (including Fisher), and other GEBCO experts to confirm their depth correction methodology. They employed a combination of NAVSAT, LORAN-C and OMEGA systems for geodetic positioning with accuracy better than 400 metres (1,300 ft). The deepest location recorded was 10,920 ± 10 m (35,827 ± 33 ft) at 11°22.4′N 142°35.5′E; for the first time documenting the eastern basin as the deepest of the three en echelon pools. In 1993, GEBCO recognized the 10,920 ± 10 m (35,827 ± 33 ft) report as the deepest depth of the world's oceans. Technological advances such as improved multi-beam sonar would be the driving force in uncovering the mysteries of the Challenger Deep into the future.

=== 1986 – RV Thomas Washington ===
The Scripps research vessel Thomas Washington's returned to the Challenger Deep in 1986 during the Papatua Expedition, Leg 8, mounting one of the first commercial multi-beam echosounders capable of reaching into the deepest trenches, i.e. the 16-beam Seabeam "Classic". This allowed chief scientist Yayanos an opportunity to transit the Challenger Deep with the most modern depth-sounding equipment available. During the pre-midnight hours of 21 April 1986, the multibeam echosounder produced a map of the Challenger Deep bottom with a swath of about 5–7 miles wide. The maximum depth recorded was 10,804 metres (35,446 ft) (location of depth is not available). Yayanos noted: "The lasting impression from this cruise comes from the thoughts of the revolutionary things that Seabeam data can do for deep biology."

=== 1988 – RV Moana Wave ===
On 22 August 1988, the U.S. Navy-owned 1,000-ton research vessel Moana Wave (AGOR-22), operated by the Hawaii Institute of Geophysics (HIG), University of Hawaiʻi, under the direction of chief scientist Robert C. Thunell from the University of South Carolina, transited northwesterly across the central basin of the Challenger Deep, conducting a single-beam bathymetry track by their 3.5 kHz narrow (30-degs) beam echosounder with a Precision Depth Recorder. In addition to sonar bathymetry, they took 44 gravity cores and 21 box cores of bottom sediments. The deepest echosoundings recorded were 10,656 to 10,916 metres (34,961–35,814 ft), with the greatest depth at 11°22′N 142°25′E in the central basin. This was the first indication that all three basins contained depths in excess of 10,900 metres (35,800 ft).

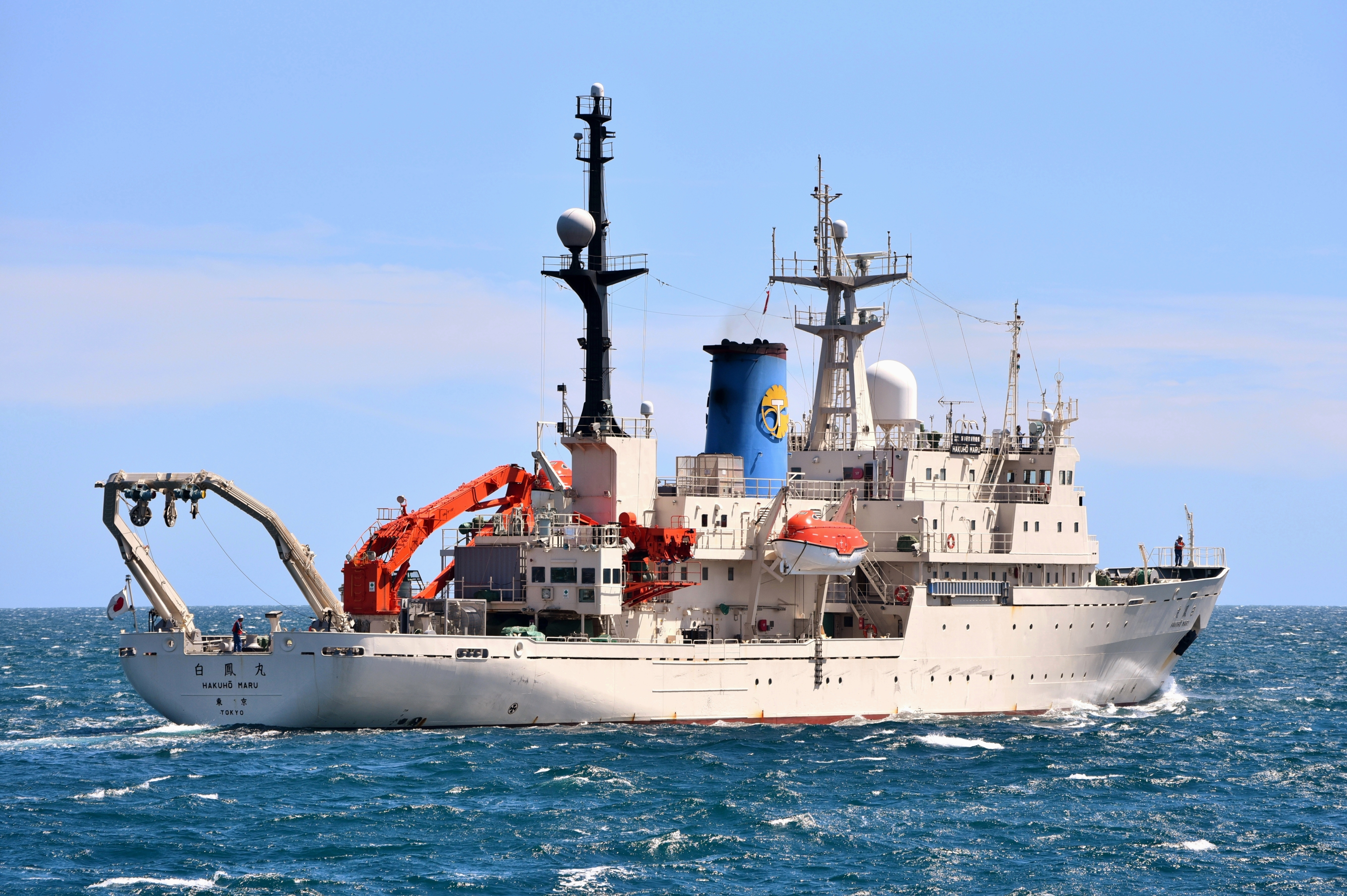
The RV Hakuhō Maru

=== 1992 – RV Hakuhō Maru ===
The 3,987-ton Japanese research vessel Hakuhō Maru, an Ocean Research Institute – University of Tokyo sponsored ship, on cruise KH-92-5 cast three Sea-Bird SBE-9 ultra-deep CTD (conductivity-temperature-depth) profilers in a transverse line across the Challenger Deep on 1 December 1992. The center CTD was located at 11°22.78′N 142°34.95′E, in the eastern basin, at 10,989 metres (36,053 ft) by the SeaBeam depth recorder and 10,884 metres (35,709 ft) by the CTD. The other two CTDs were cast 19.9 km to the north and 16.1 km to the south. Hakuhō Maru was equipped with a narrow beam SeaBeam 500 multi-beam echosounder for depth determination, and had an Auto-Nav system with inputs from NAVSAT/NNSS, GPS, Doppler Log, EM log and track display, with a geodetic positioning accuracy approaching 100 metres (330 ft). When conducting CTD operations in the Challenger deep, they used the SeaBeam as a single beam depth recorder. At 11°22.6′N 142°35.0′E the corrected depth was 10,989 metres (36,053 ft), and at 11°22.0′N 142°34.0′E the depth was 10,927 metres (35,850 ft); both in the eastern basin. This may demonstrate that the basins might not be flat sedimentary pools but rather undulate with a difference of 50 metres (160 ft) or more. Taira revealed, "We considered that a trough deeper than Vitiaz's record by 5 metres (16 ft) was detected. There is a possibility that a depth exceeding 11,000 metres (36,089 ft) with a horizontal scale less than the beam width of measurements exists in the Challenger Deep." Since each SeaBeam 2.7-degree beam width sonar ping expands to cover a circular area about 500 metres (1,640 ft) in diameter at 11,000 metres (36,089 ft) depth, dips in the bottom that are less than that size would be difficult to detect from a sonar-emitting platform seven miles above.

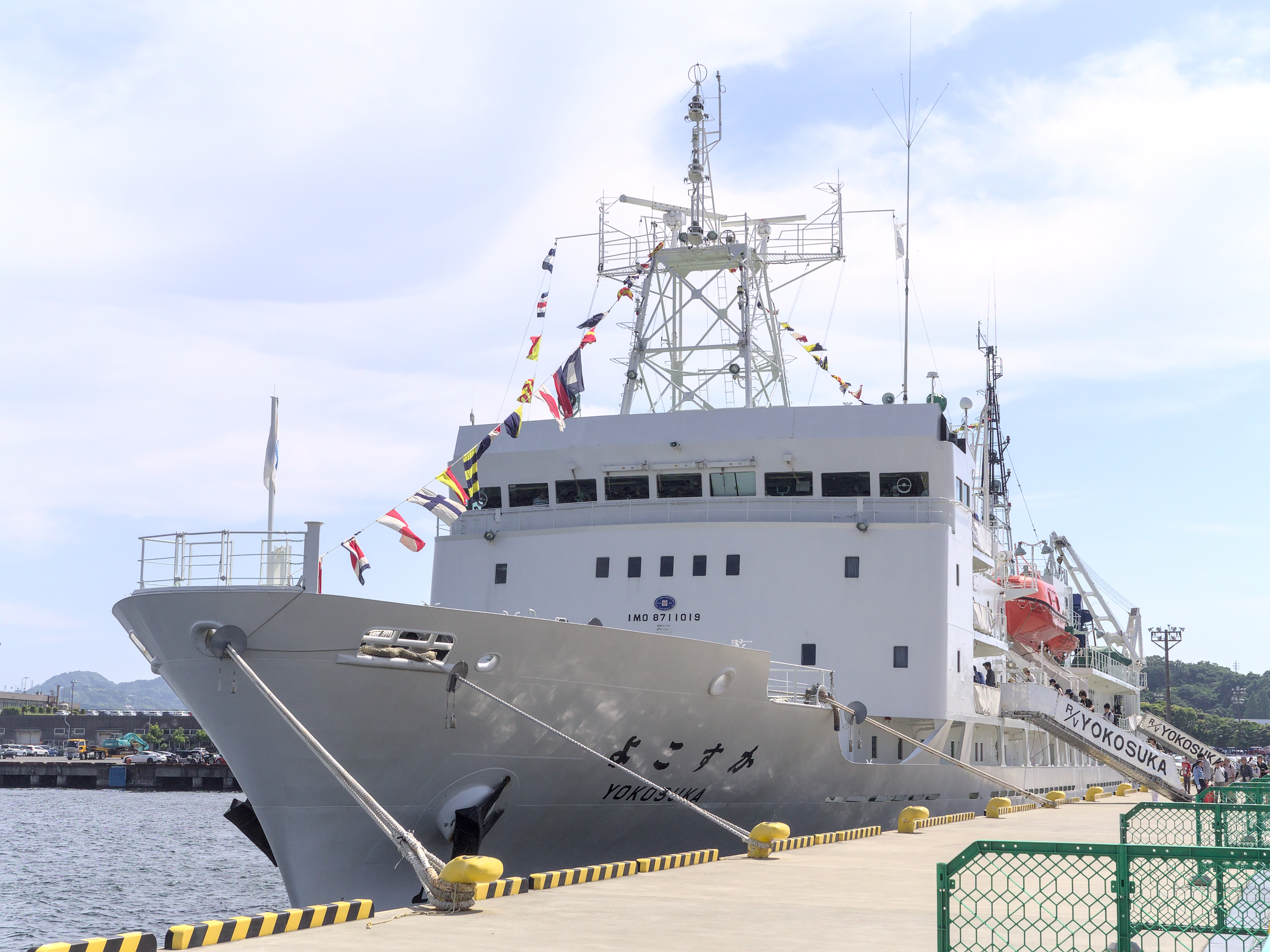
RV Yokosuka was used as the support ship for ROV Kaikō.

=== 1996 – RV Yokosuka ===
For most of 1995 and into 1996, the Japan Agency for Marine-Earth Science and Technology (JAMSTEC) employed the 4,439-ton Research Vessel Yokosuka to conduct the testing and workup of the 11,000-meter remotely-operated vehicle (ROV) Kaikō, and the 6,500 meter ROV Shinkai. It was not until February 1996, during Yokosuka's cruise Y96-06, that Kaikō was ready for its first full depth dives. On this cruise, JAMSTEC established an area of the Challenger Deep (11°10'N to 11°30'N, by 141°50'E to 143°00'E – which later was recognized as containing three separate pools/basins en echelon, each with depths in excess of 10,900 m (35,761 ft)) toward which JAMSTEC expeditions would concentrate their investigations for the next two decades. The Yokosuka employed a 151-beam SeaBeam 2112 12 kHz multibeam echosounder, allowing search swaths 12–15 km in width at 11,000 metres (36,089 ft) depth. The depth accuracy of Yokosuka's Seabeam was about 0.1% of water depth (i.e. ± 110 metres (361 ft) for 11,000 metres (36,089 ft) depth). The ship's dual GPS systems attained geodetic positioning within double digit meter (100 metres (328 ft) or better) accuracy.

=== 1998, 1999 and 2002 – RV Kairei ===
Cruise KR98-01 sent JAMSTEC's two-year-old 4,517-ton Deep Sea Research Vessel RV Kairei south for a quick but thorough depth survey of the Challenger Deep, 11–13 January 1998, under chief scientist Kantaro Fujioka. Tracking largely along the trench axis of 070–250° they made five 80-km bathymetric survey tracks, spaced about 15 km apart, overlapping their SeaBeam 2112-004 (which now allowed sub-bottom profiling penetrating as much as 75 m below the bottom) while gaining gravity and magnetic data covering the entire Challenger Deep: western, central, and eastern basins.

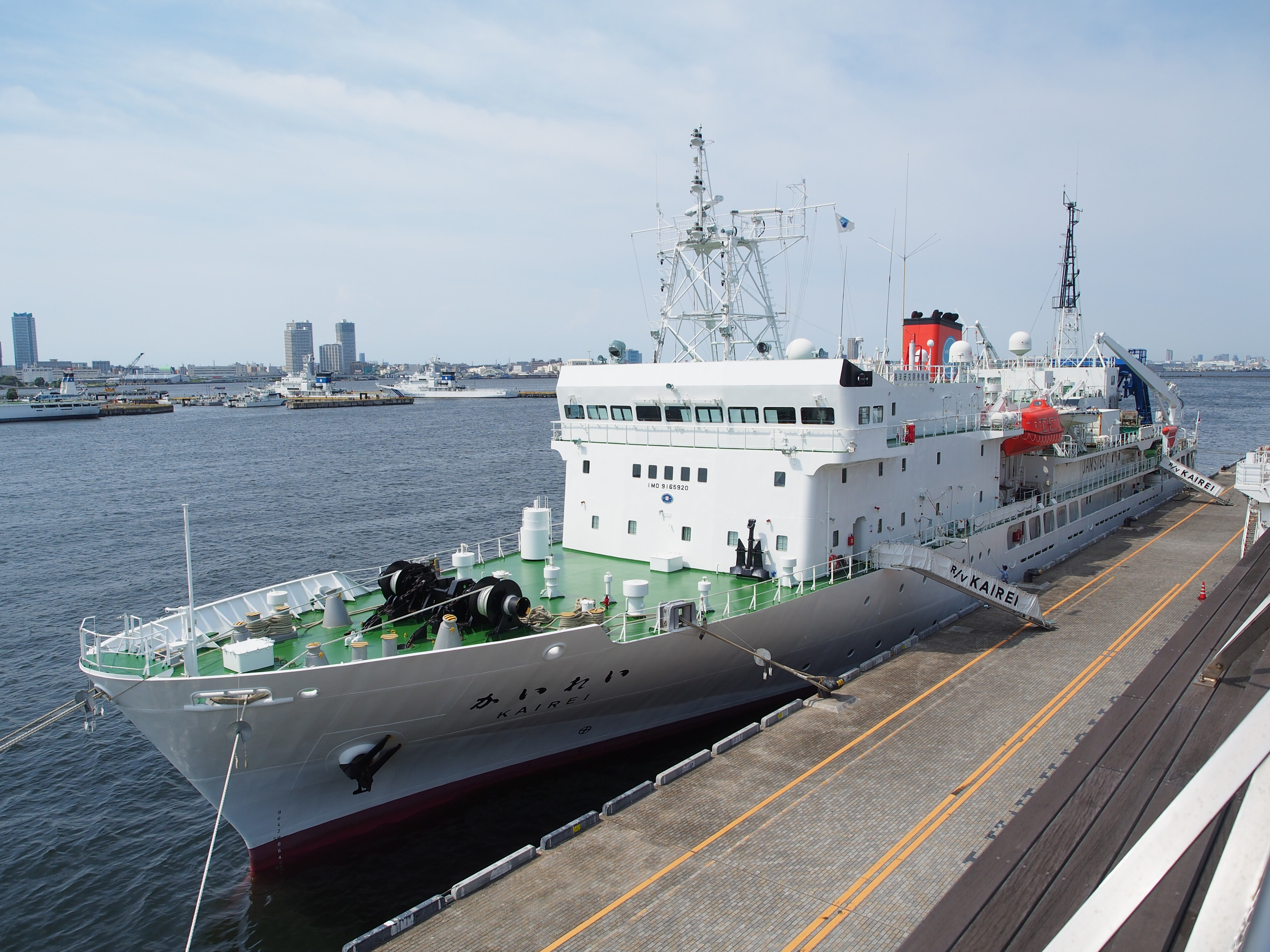
The Deep Sea Research Vessel RV Kairei was also used as the support ship for the ROV Kaikō.

Kairei returned in May 1998, cruise KR98-05, with ROV Kaikō, under the direction of chief scientist Jun Hashimoto with both geophysical and biological goals. Their bathymetric survey from 14 to 26 May was the most intensive and thorough depth and seismic survey of the Challenger Deep performed to date. Each evening, Kaikō deployed for about four hours of bottom time for biological-related sampling, plus about seven hours of vertical transit time. When Kaikō was onboard for servicing, Kairei conducted bathymetric surveys and observations. Kairei gridded a survey area about 130 km N–S by 110 km E–W. Kaikō made six dives (#71–75) all to the same location, (11°20.8' N, 142°12.35' E), near the 10,900 metres (35,800 ft) bottom contour line in the western basin.

The regional bathymetric map made from the data obtained in 1998 shows that the greatest depths in the eastern, central, and western depressions are 10,922 ± 74 m (35,833 ± 243 ft), 10,898 ± 62 m (35,755 ± 203 ft), and 10,908 ± 36 m (35,787 ± 118 ft), respectively, making the eastern depression the deepest of the three.

In 1999, Kairei revisited the Challenger Deep during cruise KR99-06. The results of the 1998–1999 surveys include the first recognition that the Challenger Deep consists of three "right-stepping en echelon individual basins bounded by the 10,500 metres (34,400 ft) depth contour line. The size of [each of] the deeps are almost identical, 14–20 km long, 4 km wide". They concluded with the proposal "that these three individual elongated deeps constitute the 'Challenger Deep', and [we] identify them as the East, Central and West Deep. The deepest depth we obtained during the swath mapping is 10,938 metres (35,886 ft) in the West Deep (11°20.34' N, 142°13.20 E)." The depth was "obtained during swath mapping ... confirmed in both N–S and E-W swaths." Speed of sound corrections were from XBT to 1,800 metres (5,900 ft), and CTD below 1,800 metres (5,900 ft).

The cross track survey of the 1999 Kairei cruise shows that the greatest depths in the eastern, central, and western depressions are 10,920 ± 10 m (35,827 ± 33 ft), 10,894 ± 14 m (35,741 ± 46 ft), and 10,907 ± 13 m (35,784 ± 43 ft), respectively, which supports the results of the previous survey.

In 2002 Kairei revisited the Challenger Deep 16–25 October 2002, as cruise KR02-13 (a cooperative Japan-US-South Korea research program) with chief scientist Jun Hashimoto in charge; again with Kazuyoshi Hirata managing the ROV Kaikō team. On this survey, the size of each of the three basins was refined to 6–10 km long by about 2 km wide and in excess of 10,850 m (35,597 ft) deep. In marked contrast to the Kairei surveys of 1998 and 1999, the detailed survey in 2002 determined that the deepest point in the Challenger Deep is located in the eastern basin around 11°22.260′N 142°35.589′E, with a depth of 10,920 ± 5 m (35,827 ± 16 ft), located about 290 m (950 ft) southeast of the deepest site determined by the survey vessel Takuyo in 1984. The 2002 surveys of both the western and eastern basins were tight, with especially meticulous cross-gridding of the eastern basin with ten parallel tracks N–S and E–W less than 250 meters apart. On the morning of 17 October, ROV Kaikō dive #272 began and recovered over 33 hours later, with the ROV working at the bottom of the western basin for 26 hours (vicinity of 11°20.148' N, 142°11.774 E at 10,893 m (35,738 ft)). Five Kaikō dives followed on a daily basis into the same area to service benthic landers and other scientific equipment, with dive #277 recovered on 25 October. Traps brought up large numbers of amphipods (sea fleas), and cameras recorded holothurians (sea cucumbers), White polychaetes (bristle worms), tube worms, and other biological species. During its 1998, 1999 surveys, Kairei was equipped with a GPS satellite-based radionavigation system. The United States government lifted the GPS selective availability in 2000, so during its 2002 survey, Kairei had access to non-degraded GPS positional services and achieved single-digit meter accuracy in geodetic positioning.

=== 2001 – RV Melville ===
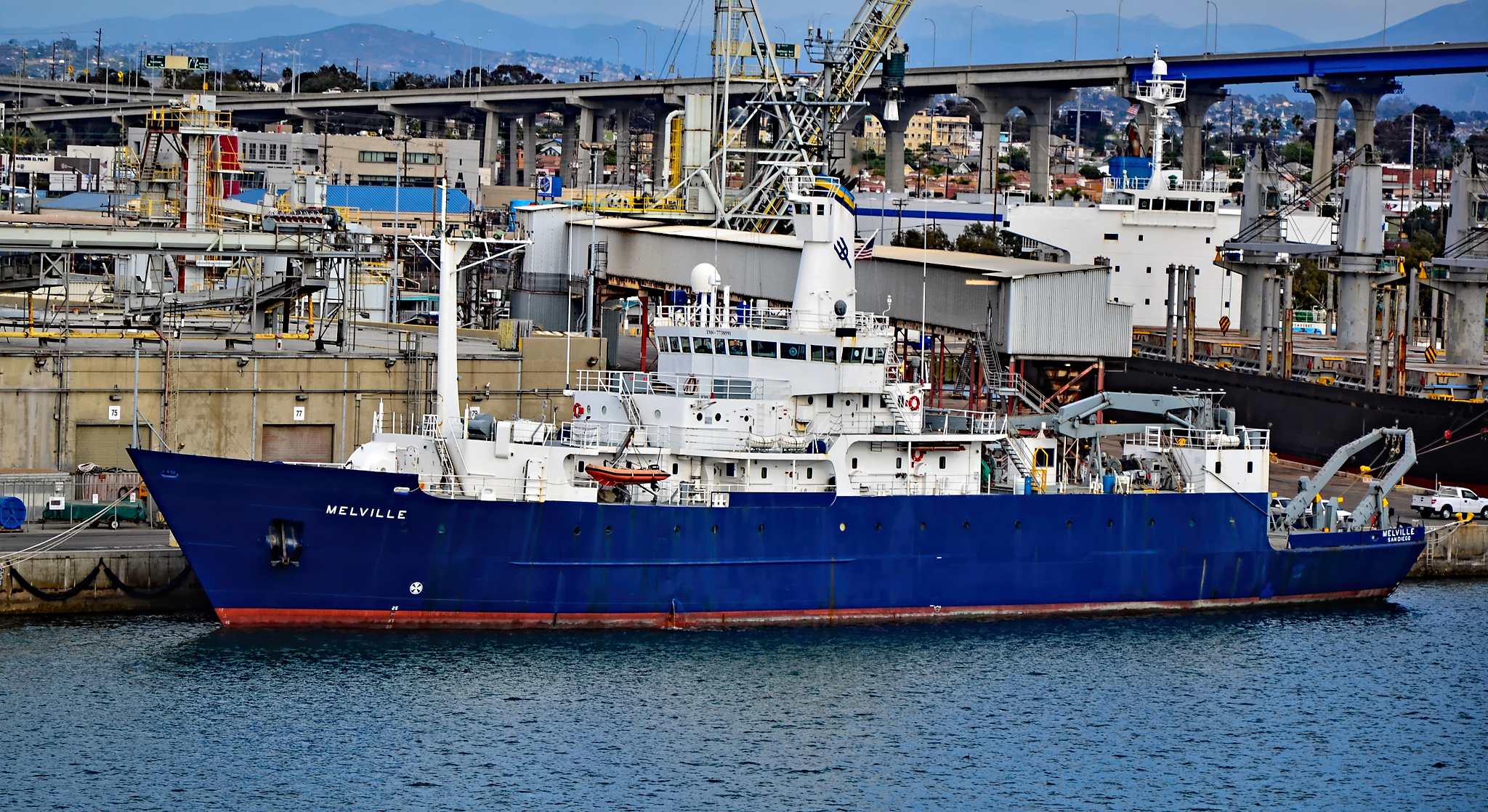
The RV Melville was operated by the Scripps Institution of Oceanography.

The 2.516-ton research vessel Melville, at the time operated by the Scripps Institution of Oceanography, took the Cook Expedition, Leg 6 with chief scientist Patricia Fryer of the University of Hawaiʻi from Guam on 10 February 2001 to the Challenger Deep for a survey titled "Subduction Factory Studies in the Southern Mariana", including HMR-1 sonar mapping, magnetics, gravity measurements, and dredging in the Mariana arc region. They covered all three basins, then tracked 120-nautical-mile-long (222.2 km) lines of bathymetry East-West, stepping northward from the Challenger Deep in 12 km (7.5 mi) sidesteps, covering more than 90 nmi (166.7 km) north into the backarc with overlapping swaths from their SeaBeam 2000 12 kHz multi-beam echosounder and MR1 towed system. They also gathered magnetic and gravity information, but no seismic data. Their primary survey instrument was the MR1 towed sonar, a shallow-towed 11/12 kHz bathymetric sidescan sonar developed and operated by the Hawaii Mapping Research Group (HMRG), a research and operational group within University of Hawaiʻi's School of Ocean and Earth Science and Technology (SOEST) and the Hawaii Institute of Geophysics and Planetology (HIGP). The MR1 is full-ocean-depth capable, providing both bathymetry and sidescan data.

Leg 7 of the Cook Expedition continued the MR-1 survey of the Mariana Trench backarc from 4 March to 12 April 2001 under chief scientist Sherman Bloomer of Oregon State University.

=== 2009 – RV Kilo Moana ===
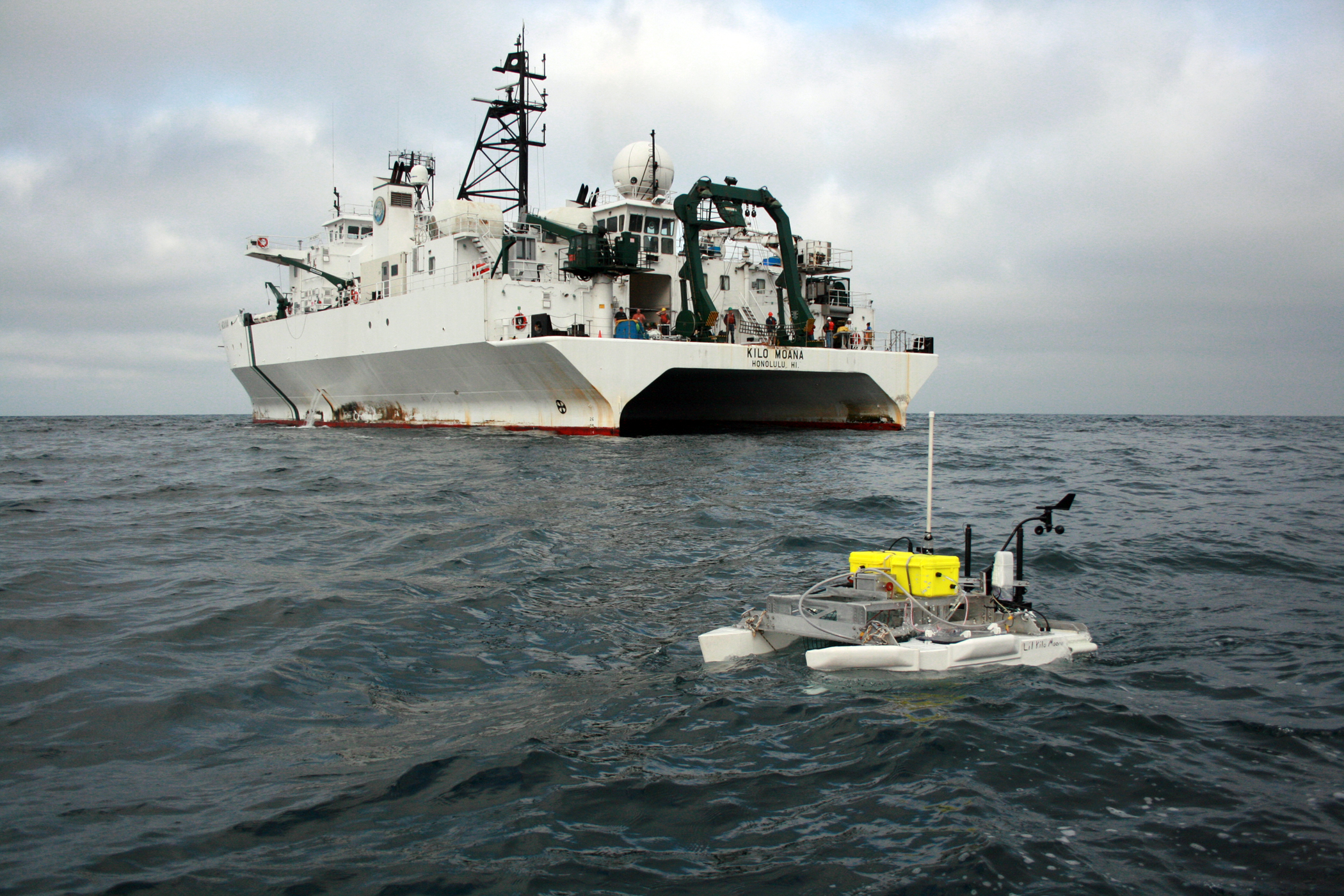
The RV Kilo Moana was used as the support ship of the HROV Nereus.

In May/June 2009, the US Navy-owned 3,064-ton twin-hulled research vessel Kilo Moana (T-AGOR 26) was sent to the Challenger Deep area to conduct research. Kilo Moana is civilian-crewed and operated by SOEST. It is equipped with two multibeam echosounders with sub-bottom profiler add-ons (the 191-beam 12 kHz Kongsberg Simrad EM120 with SBP-1200, capable of accuracies of 0.2–0.5% of water depth across the entire swath), gravimeter, and magnetometer. The EM-120 uses 1 by 1 degree sonar-emissions at the sea surface. Each 1 degree beam width sonar ping expands to cover a circular area about 192 metres (630 ft) in diameter at 11,000 metres (36,089 ft) depth. Whilst mapping the Challenger Deep the sonar equipment indicated a maximum depth of 10,971 m (35,994 ft) at an undisclosed position. Navigation equipment includes the Applanix POS MV320 V4, rated at accuracies of 0.5–2 m. RV Kilo Moana was also used as the support ship of the hybrid remotely operated underwater vehicle (HROV) Nereus that dived three times to the Challenger Deep bottom during the May/June 2009 cruise and did not confirm the sonar established maximum depth by its support ship.

=== 2009 – RV Yokosuka ===
Cruise YK09-08 brought the JAMSTEC 4,429-ton research vessel Yokosuka back to the Mariana Trough and to the Challenger Deep June–July 2009. Their mission was a two-part program: surveying three hydrothermal vent sites in the southern Mariana Trough backarc basin near 12°57'N, 143°37'E about 130 nmi northeast of the central basin of the Challenger Deep, using the autonomous underwater vehicle Urashima. AUV Urashima dives #90–94, were to a maximum depth of 3500 meters, and were successful in surveying all three sites with a Reson SEABAT7125AUV multibeam echosounder for bathymetry, and multiple water testers to detect and map trace elements spewed into the water from hydrothermal vents, white smokers, and hot spots. Kyoko OKINO from the Ocean Research Institute, University of Tokyo, was principal investigator for this aspect of the cruise. The second goal of the cruise was to deploy a new "10K free fall camera system" called Ashura, to sample sediments and biologics at the bottom of the Challenger Deep. The principal investigator at the Challenger Deep was Taishi Tsubouchi of JAMSTEC. The lander Ashura made two descents: on the first, 6 July 2009, Ashura bottomed at 11°22.3130′N 142°25.9412′E at 10,867 metres (35,653 ft). The second descent (on 10 July 2009) was to 11°22.1136′N 142°25.8547′E at 10,897 metres (35,751 ft). The 270 kg Ashura was equipped with multiple baited traps, a HTDV video camera, and devices to recover sediment, water, and biological samples (mostly amphipods at the bait, and bacteria and fungus from the sediment and water samples).

=== 2010 – USNS Sumner ===
On 7 October 2010, further sonar mapping of the Challenger Deep area was conducted by the US Center for Coastal & Ocean Mapping/Joint Hydrographic Center (CCOM/JHC) aboard the 4,762-ton Sumner. The results were reported in December 2011 at the annual American Geophysical Union fall meeting. Using a Kongsberg Maritime EM 122 multi-beam echosounder system coupled to positioning equipment that can determine latitude and longitude up to 50 cm (20 in) accuracy, from thousands of individual soundings around the deepest part the CCOM/JHC team preliminary determined that the Challenger Deep has a maximum depth of 10,994 m (36,070 ft) at 11.326344°N 142.187248°E, with an estimated vertical uncertainty of ±40 m (131 ft) at two standard deviations (i.e. ≈ 95.4%) confidence level. A secondary deep with a depth of 10,951 m (35,928 ft) was located at approximately 23.75 nmi (44.0 km) to the east at 11.369639°N 142.588582°E in the eastern basin of the Challenger Deep.

=== 2010 – RV Yokosuka ===
JAMSTEC returned Yokosuka to the Challenger Deep with cruise YK10-16, 21–28 November 2010. The chief scientist of this joint Japanese-Danish expedition was Hiroshi Kitazato of the Institute of Biogeosciences, JAMSTEC. The cruise was titled "Biogeosciences at the Challenger Deep: relict organisms and their relations to biogeochemical cycles". The Japanese teams made five deployments of their 11,000-meter camera system (three to 6,000 meters – two into the central basin of the Challenger Deep) which returned with 15 sediment cores, video records and 140 scavenging amphipod specimens. The Danish Ultra Deep Lander System was employed by Ronnie Glud et al. on four casts, two into the central basin of the Challenger Deep and two to 6,000 m some 34 nmi west of the central basin. The deepest depth recorded was on 28 November 2010 – camera cast CS5 – 11°21.9810′N 142°25.8680′E}, at a corrected depth of 10,889.6 metres (35,727 ft) (the central basin).

=== 2013 – RV Yokosuka ===
With JAMSTEC Cruises YK13-09 and YK13-12, Yokosuka hosted chief scientist Hidetaka Nomaki for a trip to New Zealand waters (YK13-09), with the return cruise identified as YK13-12. The project name was QUELLE2013; and the cruise title was: "In situ experimental & sampling study to understand abyssal biodiversity and biogeochemical cycles". They spent one day on the return trip at the Challenger Deep to obtain DNA/RNA on the large amphipods inhabiting the Deep (Hirondellea gigas). Hideki Kobayashi (Biogeos, JAMSTEC) and the team deployed a benthic lander on 23 November 2013 with eleven baited traps (three bald, five covered by insulating materials, and three automatically sealed after nine hours) into the central basin of the Challenger Deep at 11°21.9082′N 142°25.7606′E, depth 10,896 metres (35,748 ft). After an eight-hour, 46-minute stay at the bottom, they recovered some 90 individual Hirondellea gigas.

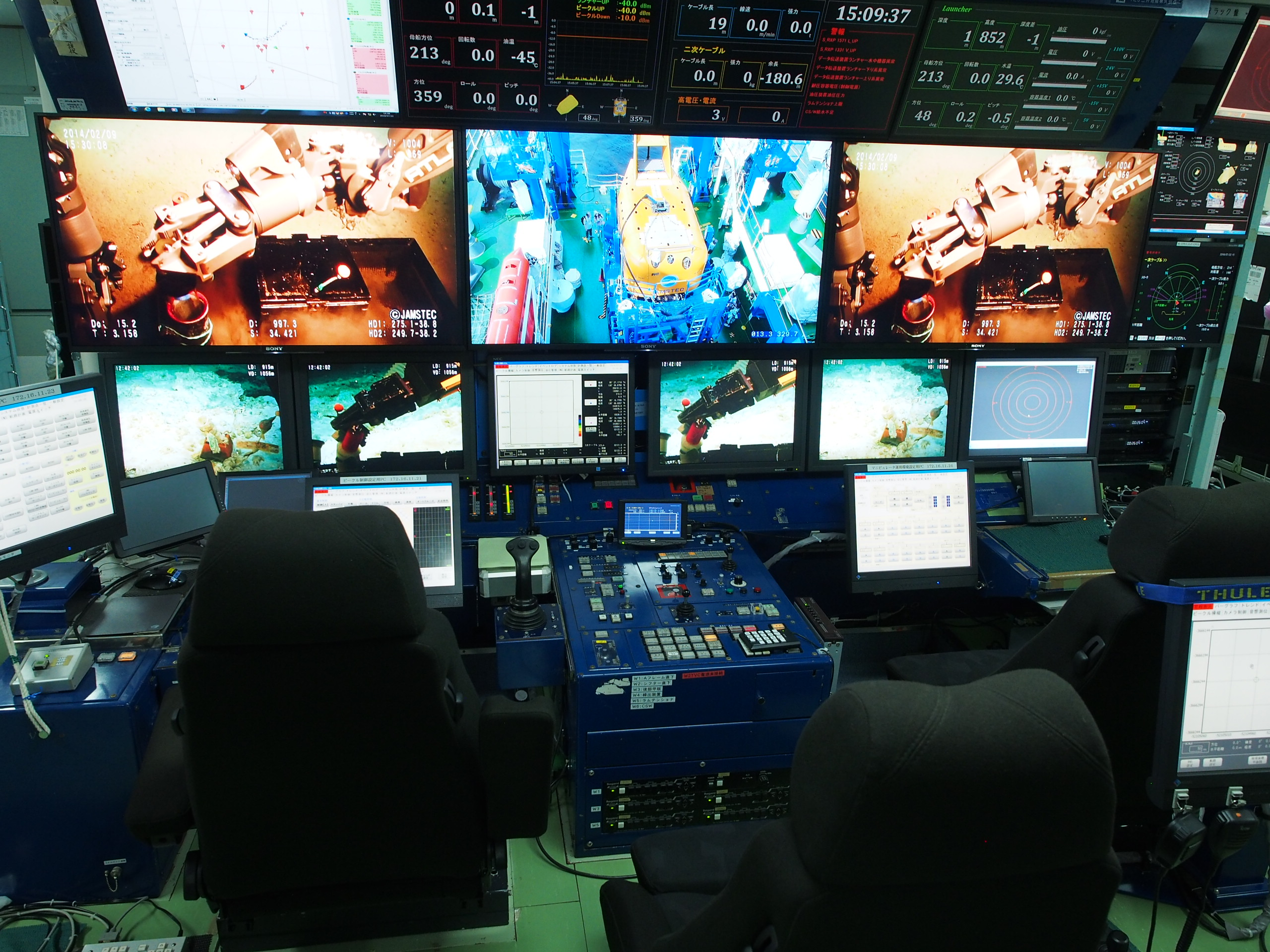
RV Kairei is used as the support ship for deep-diving ROVs.

=== 2014 – RV Kairei ===
JAMSTEC deployed Kairei to the Challenger Deep again 11–17 January 2014, under the leadership of chief scientist Takuro Nunora. The cruise identifier was KR14-01, titled: "Trench biosphere expedition for the Challenger Deep, Mariana Trench". The expedition sampled at six stations transecting the central basin, with only two deployments of the "11-K camera system" lander for sediment cores and water samples to "Station C" at the deepest depth, i.e. 11°22.19429′N 142°25.7574′E, at 10,903 metres (35,771 ft). The other stations were investigated with the "Multi-core" lander, both to the backarc northward, and to the Pacific Plate southward. The 11,000-meter capable crawler-driven ROV ABIMSO was sent to 7,646 m depth about 20 nmi due north of the central basin (ABISMO dive #21) specifically to identify possible hydrothermal activity on the north slope of the Challenger Deep, as suggested by findings from Kairei cruise KR08-05 in 2008. AMISMO's dives #20 and #22 were to 7,900 meters about 15 nmi north of the deepest waters of the central basin. Italian researchers under the leadership of Laura Carugati from the Polytechnic University of Marche, Italy (UNIVPM) were investigating the dynamics in virus/prokaryotes interactions in the Mariana Trench.

=== 2014 – RV Falkor ===
From 16 to 19 December 2014, the Schmidt Ocean Institute's 2,024-ton research vessel Falkor, under chief scientist Douglas Bartlett from the Scripps Institution of Oceanography, deployed four different untethered instruments into the Challenger Deep for seven total releases. Four landers were deployed on 16 December into the central basin: the baited video-equipped lander Leggo for biologics; the lander ARI to 11°21.5809′N 142°27.2969′E for water chemistry; and the probes Deep Sound 3 and Deep Sound 2. Both Deep Sound probes recorded acoustics floating at 9,000 metres (29,528 ft) depth, until Deep Sound 3 imploded at the depth of 8,620 metres (28,281 ft) (about 2,200 metres (7,218 ft) above the bottom) at 11°21.99′N 142°27.2484′E. The Deep Sound 2 recorded the implosion of Deep Sound 3, providing a unique recording of an implosion within the Challenger Deep depression. In addition to the loss of the Deep Sound 3 by implosion, the lander ARI failed to respond upon receiving its instruction to drop weights, and was never recovered. On 16/17 December, Leggo was returned to the central basin baited for amphipods. On the 17th, RV Falkor relocated 17 nms eastward to the eastern basin, where they again deployed both the Leggo (baited and with its full camera load), and the Deep Sound 2. Deep Sound 2 was programmed to drop to 9,000 metres (29,528 ft) and remain at that depth during its recording of sounds within the trench. On 19 December Leggo landed at 11°22.11216′N 142°35.250996′E at a uncorrected depth of 11,168 metres (36,640 ft) according to its pressure sensor readings. This reading was corrected to 10,929 metres (35,856 ft) depth. Leggo returned with good photography of amphipods feeding on the lander's mackerel bait and with sample amphipods. Falknor departed the Challenger Deep on 19 December en route the Marianas Trench Marine National Monument to the Sirena Deep. RV Falkor had both a Kongsberg EM302 and EM710 multibeam echosounder for bathymetry, and an Oceaneering C-Nav 3050 global navigation satellite system receiver, capable of calculating geodetic positioning with an accuracy better than 5 cm (2.0 in) horizontally and 15 cm (5.9 in) vertically.

=== 2015 – USCGC Sequoia ===
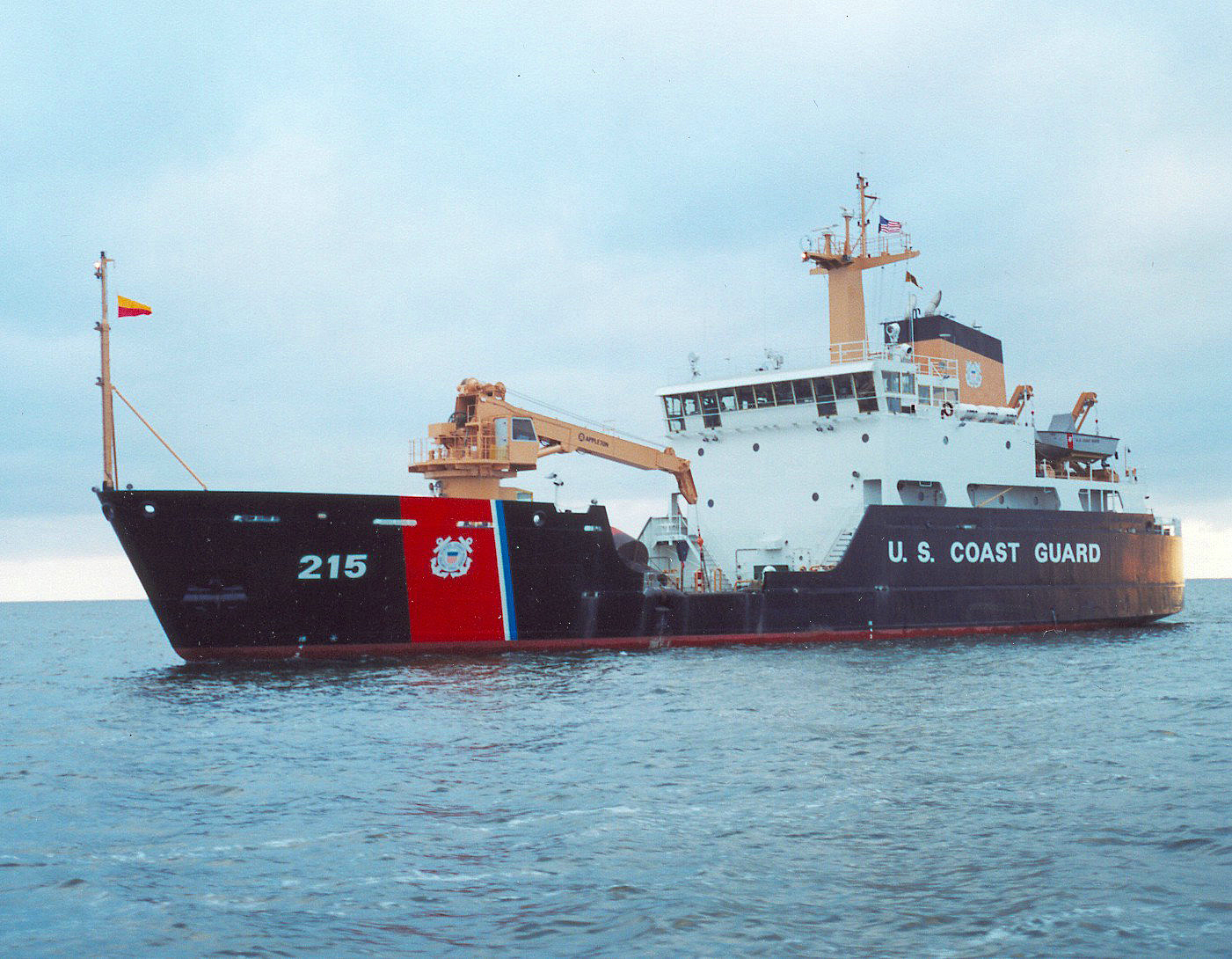
US Coast Guard Cutter Sequoia (WLB 215)

From 10 to 13 July 2015, the Guam-based 1,930-ton US Coast Guard Cutter Sequoia (WLB 215) hosted a team of researchers, under chief scientist Robert P. Dziak, from the NOAA Pacific Marine Environmental Laboratory (PMEL), the University of Washington, and Oregon State University, in deploying PMEL's "Full-Ocean Depth Mooring", a 45-meter-long moored deep-ocean hydrophone and pressure sensor array into the western basin of the Challenger Deep. A 6-hour descent into the western basin anchored the array at 10,854.7 ± 8.9 m (35,613 ± 29 ft) of water depth, at 11°20.127′N 142°12.0233′E, about 1 km northeast of Sumner's deepest depth, recorded in 2010. After 16 weeks, the moored array was recovered on 2–4 November 2015. "Observed sound sources included earthquake signals (T phases), baleen and odontocete cetacean vocalizations, ship propeller sounds, airguns, active sonar and the passing of a Category 4 typhoon." The science team described their results as "the first multiday, broadband record of ambient sound at Challenger Deep, as well as only the fifth direct depth measurement".

=== 2016 – RV Xiangyanghong 09 ===
The 3,536-ton research vessel Xiangyanghong 09 deployed on Leg II of the 37th China Cruise Dayang (DY37II) sponsored by the National Deep Sea Center, Qingdao and the Institute of Deep-Sea Science and Engineering, Chinese Academy of Sciences (Sanya, Hainan), to the Challenger Deep western basin area (11°22' N, 142°25' E) 4 June – 12 July 2016. As the mother ship for China's manned deep submersible Jiaolong, the expedition carried out an exploration of the Challenger Deep to investigate the geological, biological, and chemical characteristics of the hadal zone. The diving area for this leg was on the southern slope of the Challenger Deep, at depths from about 6,300 to 8,300 metres (20,669 to 27,231 ft). The submersible completed nine piloted dives on the northern backarc and south area (Pacific plate) of the Challenger Deep to depths from 5,500 to 6,700 metres (18,045 to 21,982 ft). During the cruise, Jiaolong regularly deployed gas-tight samplers to collect water near the sea bottom. In a test of navigational proficiency, Jiaolong used an Ultra-Short Base Line (USBL) positioning system at a depth more than 6,600 metres (21,654 ft) to retrieve sampling bottles.

=== 2016 – RV Tansuo 01 ===
From 22 June to 12 August 2016 (cruises 2016S1 and 2016S2), the Chinese Academy of Sciences' 6,250-ton submersible support ship Tansuo 1 (meaning: to explore) on her maiden voyage deployed to the Challenger Deep from her home port of Sanya, Hainan Island. On 12 July 2016, the ROV Haidou-1 dived to a depth of 10,767 metres (35,325 ft) in the Challenger Deep area. They also cast a free-drop lander, 9,000 metres (29,528 ft) rated free-drop ocean-floor seismic instruments (deployed to 7,731 metres (25,364 ft)), obtained sediment core samples, and collected over 2000 biological samples from depths ranging from 5,000 to 10,000 metres (16,404–32,808 ft). The Tansuo 01 operated along the 142°30.00' longitude line, about 30 nmi east of the earlier DY37II cruise survey (see Xiangyanghong 09 above).

=== 2016 – RV Sonne ===
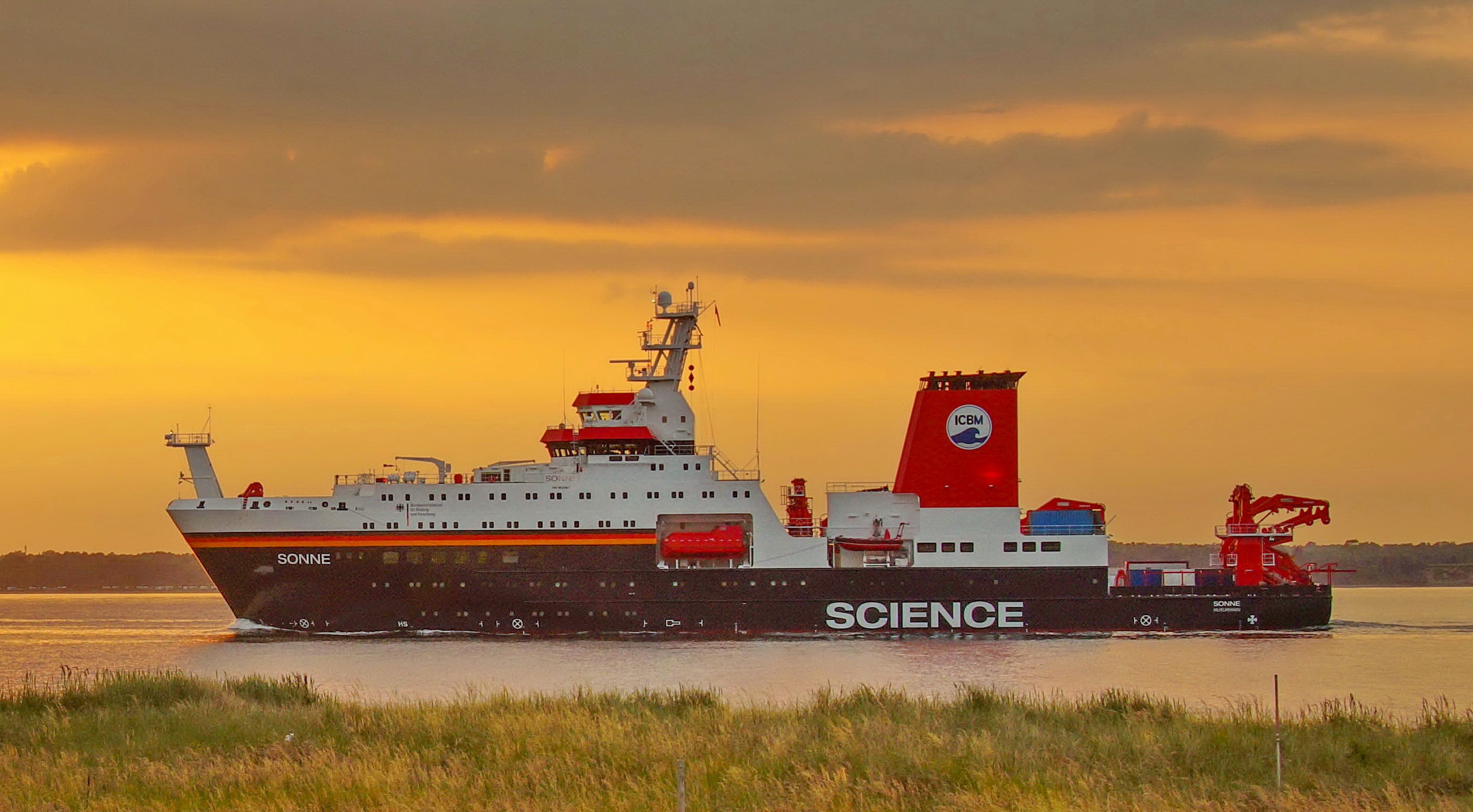
German maritime research vessel Sonne

In November 2016 sonar mapping of the Challenger Deep area was conducted by the Royal Netherlands Institute for Sea Research (NIOZ)/GEOMAR Helmholtz Centre for Ocean Research Kiel aboard the 8,554-ton Deep Ocean Research Vessel Sonne. The results were reported in 2017. Using a Kongsberg Maritime EM 122 multi-beam echosounder system coupled to positioning equipment that can determine latitude and longitude the team determined that the Challenger Deep has a maximum depth of 10,925 m (35,843 ft) at 11°19.945′N 142°12.123′E (11.332417°N 142.20205°E), with an estimated vertical uncertainty of ±12 m (39 ft) at one standard deviation (≈ 68.3%) confidence level. The analysis of the sonar survey offered a 100 by 100 metres (328 ft × 328 ft) grid resolution at bottom depth, so small dips in the bottom that are less than that size would be difficult to detect from the 0.5 by 1 degree sonar-emissions at the sea surface. Each 0.5-degree beam width sonar ping expands to cover a circular area about 96 metres (315 ft) in diameter at 11,000 metres (36,089 ft) depth. The horizontal position of the grid point has an uncertainty of ±50 to 100 m (164 to 328 ft), depending on along-track or across-track direction. This depth (59 m (194 ft)) and position (about 410 m (1,345 ft) to the northeast) measurements differ significantly from the deepest point determined by the Gardner et al. (2014) study. The observed depth discrepancy with the 2010 sonar mapping and Gardner et al. 2014 study are related to the application of differing sound velocity profiles, which are essential for accurate depth determination. Sonne used CTD casts about 1.6 km west of the deepest sounding to near the bottom of the Challenger Deep that were used for sound velocity profile calibration and optimization. Likewise, the impact of using different projections, datum and ellipsoids during data acquisition can cause positional discrepancies between surveys.

=== 2016 – RV Shiyan 3 ===
In December 2016, the CAS 3,300-ton research vessel Shiyan 3 (simplified Chinese: 实验3; traditional Chinese: 實驗3; pinyin: Shíyàn Sān Hào; lit. 'Experiment 3') deployed 33 broadband seismometers onto both the backarc northwest of the Challenger Deep, and onto the near southern Pacific Plate to the southeast, at depths of up to 8,137 m (26,696 ft). This cruise was part of a $12 million Chinese-U.S. initiative, led by co-leader Jian Lin of the Woods Hole Oceanographic Institution; a 5-year effort (2017–2021) to image in fine detail the rock layers in and around the Challenger Deep.

=== 2016 – RV Zhang Jian ===
The newly launched 4,800-ton research vessel (and mothership for the Rainbow Fish series of deep submersibles), the Zhang Jian departed Shanghai on 3 December. Their cruise was to test three new deep-sea landers, one uncrewed search submersible and the new Rainbow Fish 11,000-meter manned deep submersible, all capable of diving to 10,000 meters. From 25 to 27 December, three deep-sea landing devices descended into the trench. The first Rainbow Fish lander took photographs, the second took sediment samples, and the third took biological samples. All three landers reached over 10,000 meters, and the third device brought back 103 amphipods. Cui Weicheng, director of Hadal Life Science Research Center at Shanghai Ocean University, led the team of scientists to carry out research at the Challenger Deep in the Mariana Trench. The ship is part of China's national marine research fleet but is owned by a Shanghai marine technology company.

=== 2017 – RV Tansuo-1 ===
CAS' Institute of Deep-sea Science and Engineering sponsored Tansuo-1's return to the Challenger Deep 20 January – 5 February 2017 (cruise TS03) with baited traps for the capture of fish and other macrobiology near the Challenger and Sirena Deeps. On 29 January they recovered photography and samples of a new species of snailfish from the Northern slope of the Challenger Deep at 7,581 metres (24,872 ft), newly designated Pseudoliparis swirei. They also placed four or more CTD casts into the central and eastern basins of the Challenger Deep, as part of the World Ocean Circulation Experiment (WOCE).

=== 2017 – RV Shinyo Maru ===
Tokyo University of Marine Science and Technology dispatched the research vessel Shinyo Maru to the Mariana Trench from 20 January to 5 February 2017 with baited traps for the capture of fish and other macrobiology near the Challenger and Sirena Deeps. On 29 January they recovered photography and samples of a new species of snailfish from the Northern slope of the Challenger Deep at 7,581 metres (24,872 ft), which has been newly designated Pseudoliparis swirei.

=== 2017 – RV Kexue 3 ===
Water samples were collected at Challenger Deep from 11 layers of the Mariana Trench in March 2017. Seawater samples from 4 to 4,000 m were collected by Niskin bottles mounted to a Seabird SBE25 CTDs; whereas water samples at depths from 6,050 m to 8,320 m were collected by a self-designed acoustic-controlled full ocean depth water samplers. In this study, scientists studied the RNA of pico- and nano-plankton from the surface to the hadal zone.

=== 2017 – RV Kairei ===
JAMSTEC deployed Kairei to the Challenger Deep in May 2017 for the express purpose of testing the new full-ocean depth ROV UROV11K (Underwater ROV 11,000-meter-capable), as cruise KR 17-08C, under chief scientist Takashi Murashima. The cruise title was: "Sea trial of a full depth ROV UROV11K system in the Mariana Trench". UROV11K carried a new 4K High Definition video camera system, and new sensors to monitor the hydrogen-sulfide, methane, oxygen, and hydrogen content of the water. Unfortunately, on UROV11K's ascent from 10,899 metres (35,758 ft) (at about 11°22.30'N 142°35.8 E, in the eastern basin) on 14 May 2017, the ROV's buoyancy failed at 5,320 metres (17,454 ft) depth, and all efforts to retrieve the ROV were unsuccessful. The rate of descent and drift is not available, but the ROV bottomed to the east of the deepest waters of the eastern basin as revealed by the ship's maneuvering on 14 May. Murashima then directed the Kairei to a location about 35 nmi east of the eastern basin of the Challenger Deep to test a new "Compact Hadal Lander" which made three descents to depths from 7,498 to 8,178 m for testing the Sony 4K camera and for photography of fish and other macro-biologics.

=== 2018 – RV Shen Kuo ===
On its maiden voyage, the 2,150-ton twin-hulled scientific research vessel Shen Kuo (also Shengkuo, Shen Ko, or Shen Quo), departed Shanghai on 25 November 2018 and returned on 8 January 2019. They operated in the Mariana Trench area, and on 13 December tested a system of underwater navigation at a depth exceeding 10,000 metres, during a field trial of the Tsaihungyuy (ultra-short baseline) system. Project leader Tsui Veichen stated that, with the Tsaihungyuy equipment at depth, it was possible to obtain a signal and determine exact geolocations. The research team from Shanghai Ocean University and Westlake University was led by Cui Weicheng, director of Shanghai Ocean University's Hadal Science and Technology Research Center (HSRC). The equipment to be tested included a piloted submersible (not full ocean depth – depth achieved not available) and two deep-sea landers, all capable of diving to depths of 10,000 meters, as well as an ROV that can go to 4,500 meters. They took photographs and obtained samples from the trench, including water, sediment, macro-organisms and micro-organisms. Cui says, "If we can take photos of fish more than 8,145 meters under water, ... we will break the current world record. We will test our new equipment including the landing devices. They are second generation. The first generation could only take samples in one spot per dive, but this new second generation can take samples at different depths in one dive. We also tested the ultra short baseline acoustic positioning system on the manned submersible, the future of underwater navigation."

=== 2019 – RV Sally Ride ===
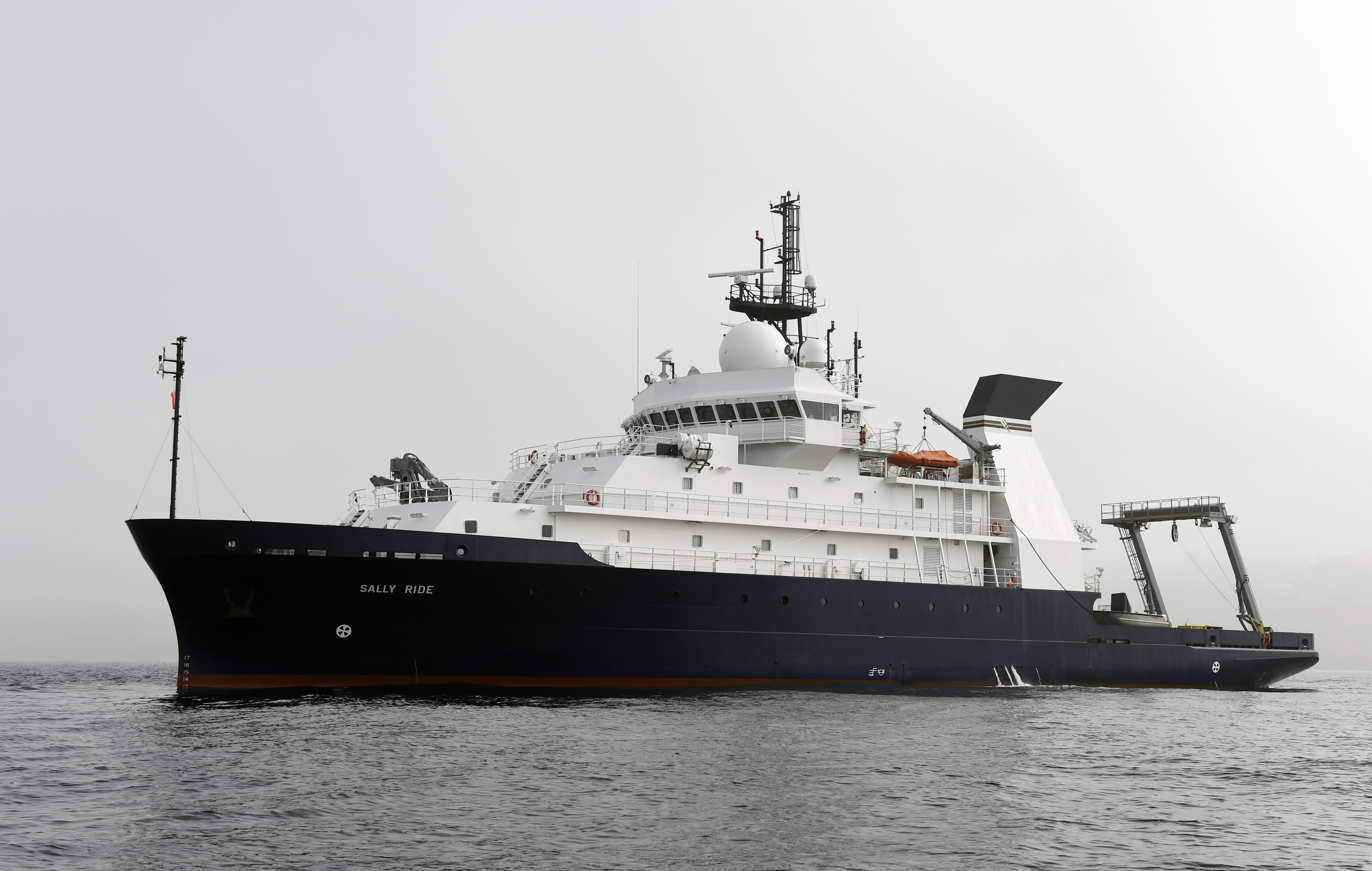
General Oceanographic RV Sally Ride

In November 2019, as cruise SR1916, a NIOZ team led by chief scientist Hans van Haren, with Scripps technicians, deployed to the Challenger Deep aboard the 2,641-ton research vessel Sally Ride, to recover a mooring line from the western basin of the Challenger Deep. The 7 km (4.3 mi) long mooring line in the Challenger Deep consisted of top-floatation positioned around 4 km (2.5 mi) depth, two sections of Dyneema neutrally buoyant 6 mm (0.2 in) line, two Benthos acoustic releases and two sections of self-contained instrumentation to measure and store current, salinity and temperature. Around the 6 km (3.7 mi) depth position two current meters were mounted below a 200 m (656 ft) long array of 100 high-resolution temperature sensors. In the lower position starting 600 m (1,969 ft) above the sea floor 295 specially designed high-resolution temperature sensors were mounted, the lowest of which was 8 m (26 ft) above the trench floor. The mooring line was deployed and left by the NIOZ team during the November 2016 RV Sonne expedition with the intention to be recovered in late 2018 by Sonne. The acoustic commanded release mechanism near the bottom of the Challenger Deep failed at the 2018 attempt. RV Sally Ride was made available exclusively for a final attempt to retrieve the mooring line before the release mechanism batteries expired. Sally Ride arrived at the Challenger Deep on 2 November. This time a 'deep release unit' lowered by one of Sally Ride's winch-cables to around 1,000 m depth pinged release commands and managed to contact the near-bottom releases. After being submerged for nearly three years, mechanical problems occurred in 15 of the 395 temperature sensors. The first results indicate the occurrence of internal waves in the Challenger Deep.

== Crewed descents ==
=== 1960 – Trieste ===
On 23 January 1960, the Swiss-designed Trieste, originally built in Italy and acquired by the U.S. Navy, supported by the USS Wandank (ATF 204) and escorted by the USS Lewis (DE 535), descended to the ocean floor in the trench piloted by Jacques Piccard (who co-designed the submersible along with his father, Auguste Piccard) and USN Lieutenant Don Walsh. Their crew compartment was inside a spherical pressure vessel – measuring 2.16 metres in diameter suspended beneath a buoyancy tank 18.4 metres in length – which was a heavy-duty replacement (of the Italian original) built by Krupp Steel Works of Essen, Germany. The steel walls were 12.7 cm (5.0 in) thick and designed to withstand pressure of up to 1250 kilograms per square centimetre (17800 psi; 1210 atm; 123 MPa). Their descent took almost five hours and the two men spent barely twenty minutes on the ocean floor before undertaking the three-hour-and-fifteen-minute ascent. Their early departure from the ocean floor was due to their concern over a crack in the outer window caused by the temperature differences during their descent.

Trieste dived at/near 11°18.5′N 142°15.5′E, bottoming at 10,911 metres (35,797 ft) ±7 m (23 ft) into the Challenger Deep's western basin, as measured by an onboard manometer. Another source states the measured depth at the bottom was measured with a manometer at 10,913 m (35,804 ft) ±5 m (16 ft). Navigation of the support ships was by celestial and LORAN-C with an accuracy of 460 metres (1,510 ft) or less. Fisher noted that the Trieste's reported depth "agrees well with the sonic sounding."

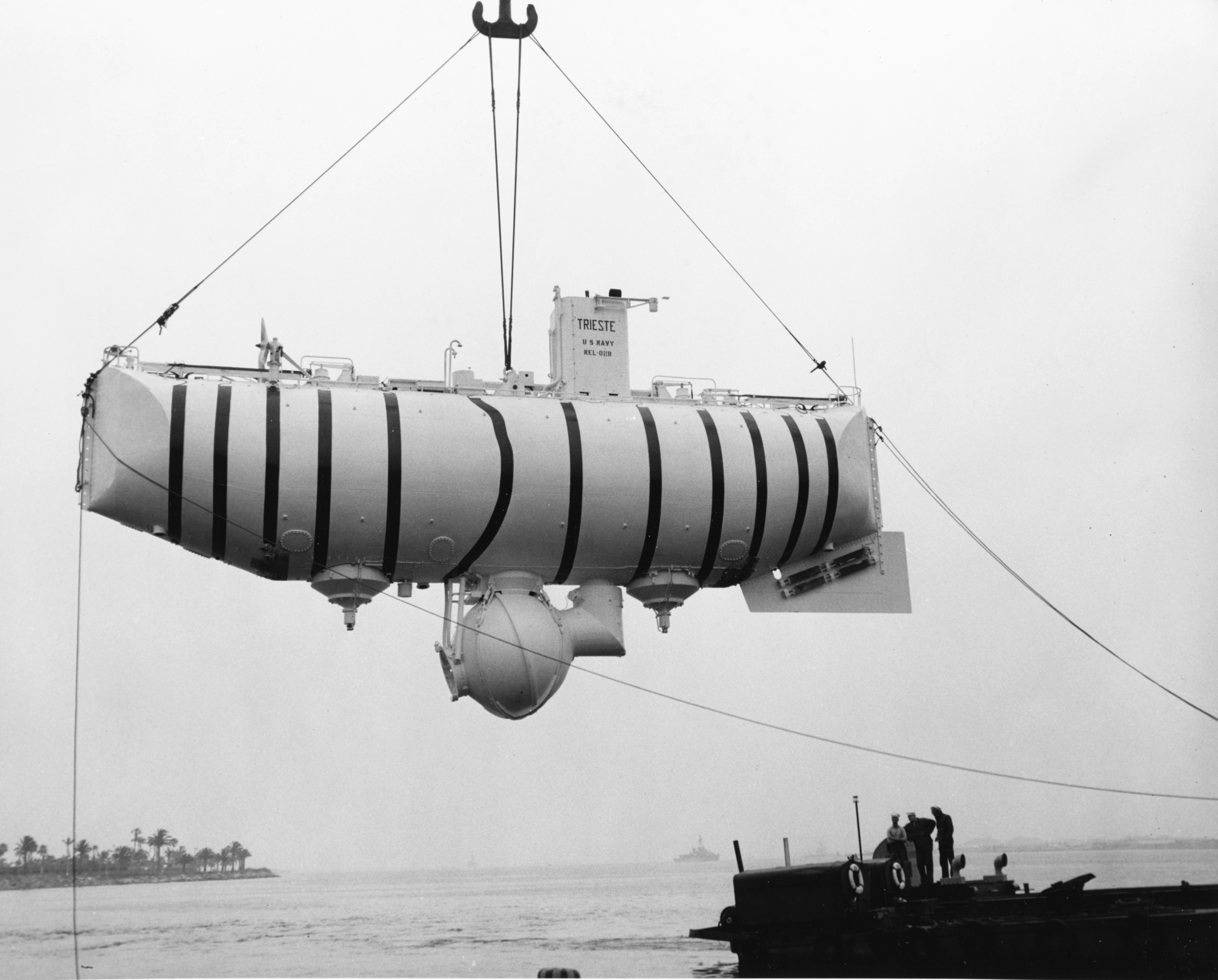
Bathyscaphe Trieste. The spherical crew cabin is attached to the underside of a tank filled with gasoline (which is incompressible), which serves as a float giving the craft buoyancy.

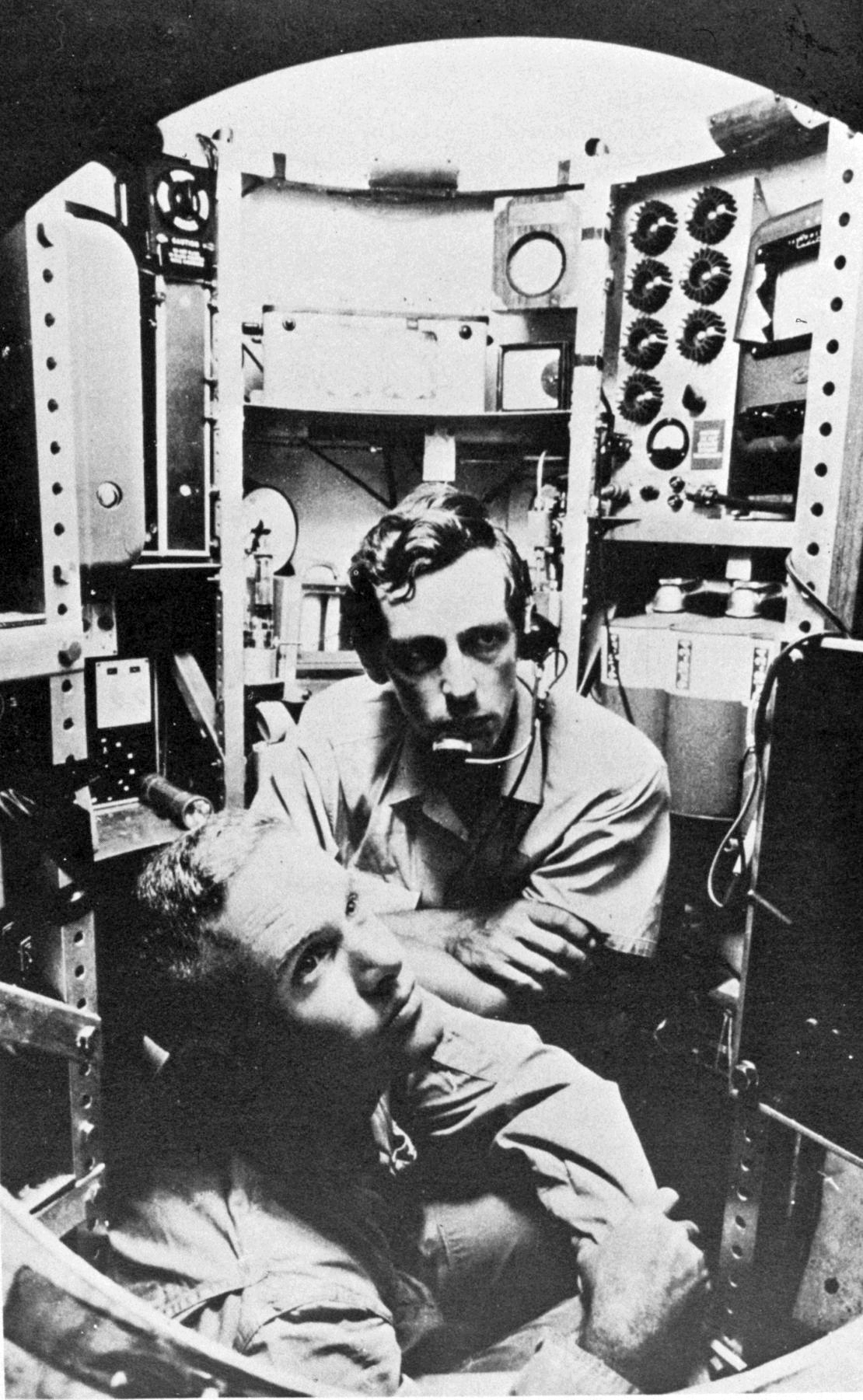
Lt. Don Walsh, USN (bottom) and Jacques Piccard (middle) in the Trieste

=== 2012 – Deepsea Challenger ===
On 26 March 2012 (local time), Canadian film director James Cameron made a solo descent in the DSV Deepsea Challenger to the bottom of the Challenger Deep. At approximately 05:15 ChST on 26 March (19:15 UTC on 25 March), the descent began. At 07:52 ChST (21:52 UTC), Deepsea Challenger arrived at the bottom. The descent lasted 2 hours and 36 minutes and the recorded depth was 10,908 metres (35,787 ft) when Deepsea Challenger touched down. Cameron had planned to spend about six hours near the ocean floor exploring but decided to start the ascent to the surface after only 2 hours and 34 minutes. The time on the bottom was shortened because a hydraulic fluid leak in the lines controlling the manipulator arm obscured the visibility out of the only viewing port. It also caused the loss of the submersible's starboard thrusters. At around 12:00 ChST (02:00 UTC on 26 March), the Deepsea Challenger website says the sub resurfaced after a 90-minute ascent, although Paul Allen's tweets indicate the ascent took only about 67 minutes. During a post-dive press conference Cameron said: "I landed on a very soft, almost gelatinous flat plain. Once I got my bearings, I drove across it for quite a distance ... and finally worked my way up the slope." The whole time, Cameron said, he didn't see any fish, or any living creatures more than an inch (2.54 cm) long: "The only free swimmers I saw were small amphipods" – shrimplike bottom-feeders.

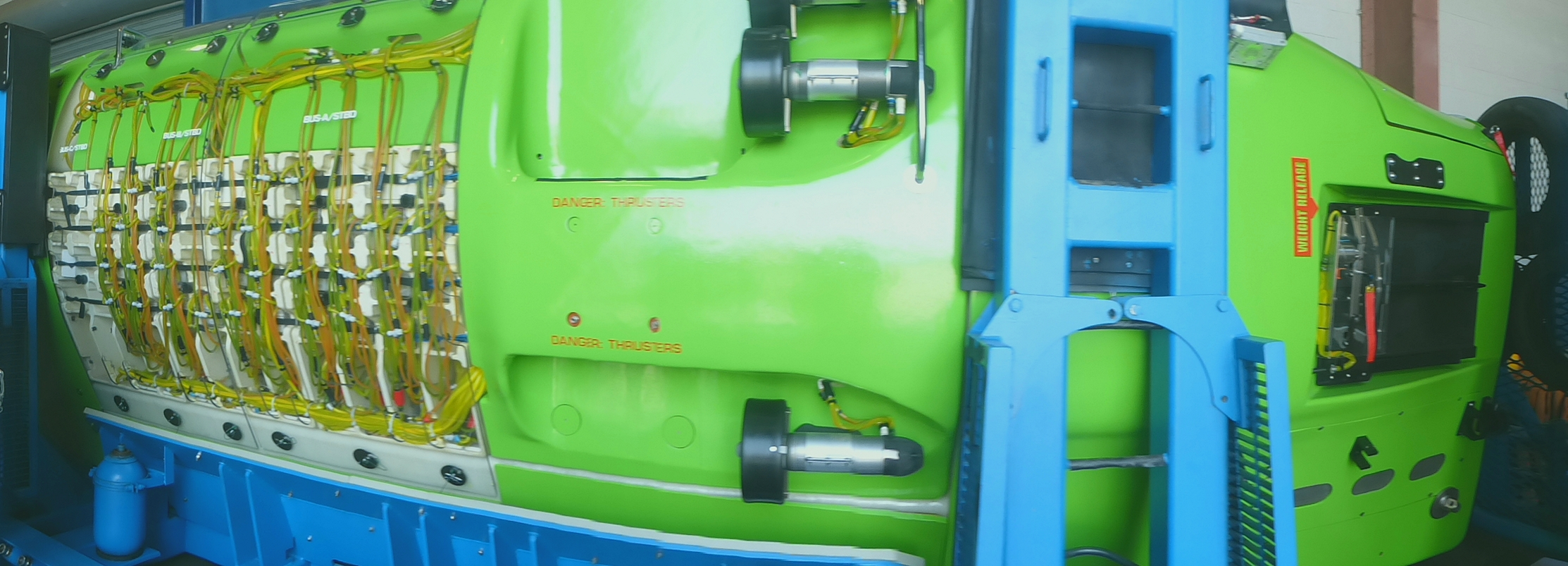
DSV Deepsea Challenger

=== 2019 – Five Deeps Expedition / DSV Limiting Factor ===
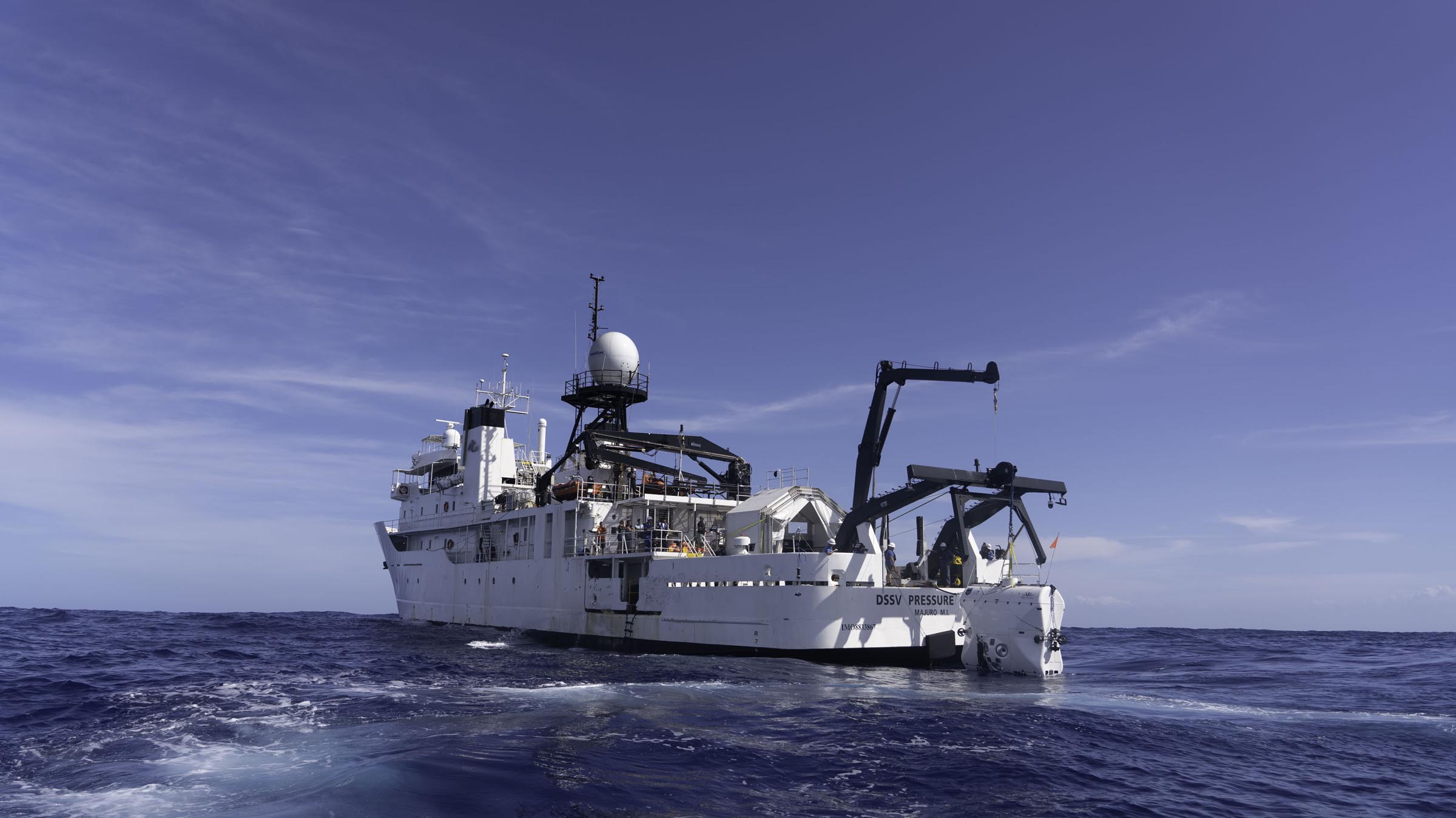
DSSV Pressure Drop and DSV Limiting Factor at its stern

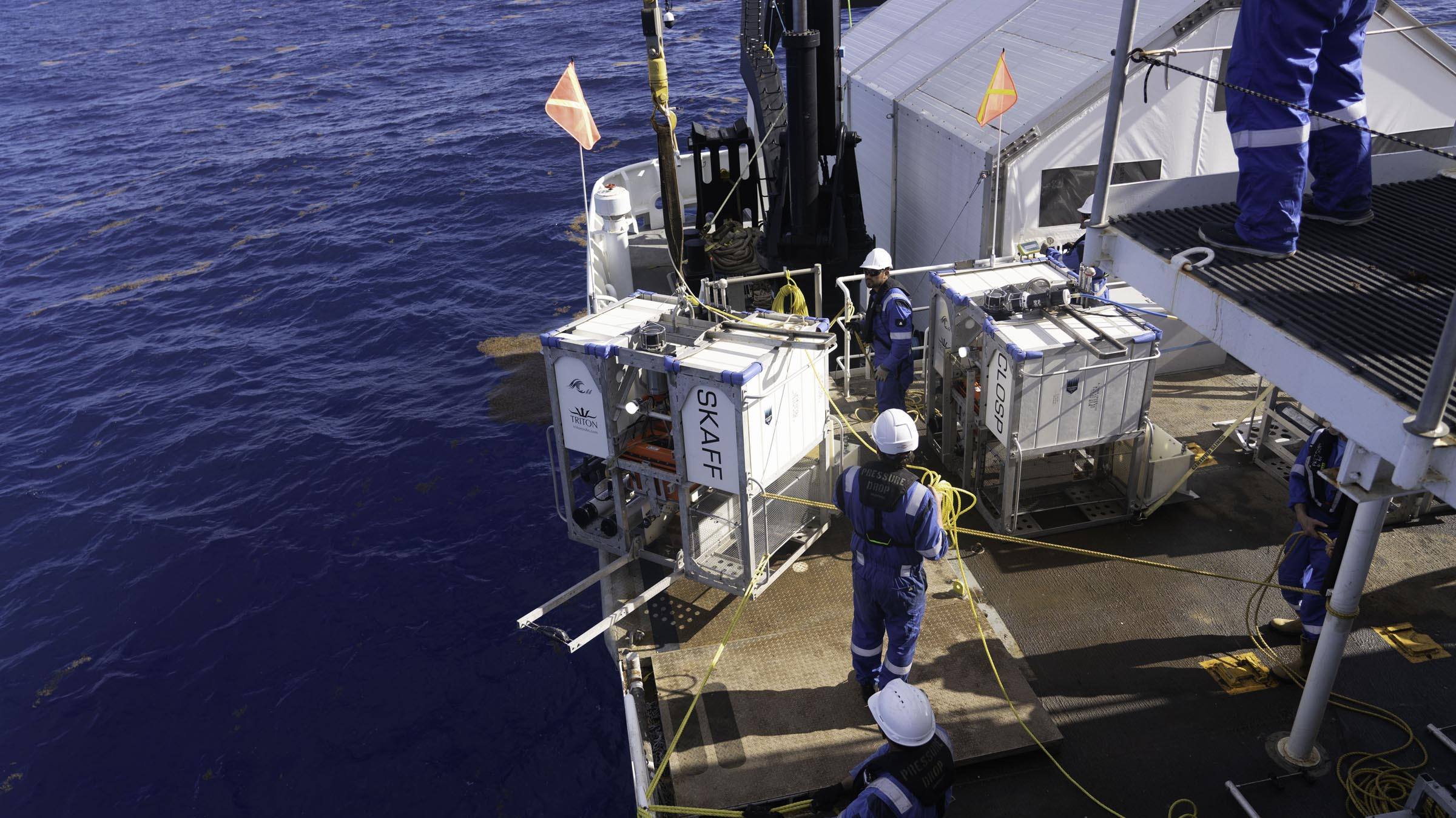
The landers Skaff and Closp are prepared for a deployment during the Five Deeps Expedition.

The Five Deeps Expedition's objective was to thoroughly map and visit the deepest points of all five of the world's oceans by the end of September 2019. On 28 April 2019, explorer Victor Vescovo descended to the "Eastern Pool" of the Challenger Deep in the Deep-Submergence Vehicle Limiting Factor (a Triton 36000/2 model submersible). Between 28 April and 4 May 2019, the Limiting Factor completed four dives to the bottom of Challenger Deep. The fourth dive descended to the slightly less deep "Central Pool" of the Challenger Deep (crew: Patrick Lahey, Pilot; John Ramsay, Sub Designer). The Five Deeps Expedition estimated maximum depths of 10,927 m (35,850 ft) ±8 m (26 ft) and 10,928 m (35,853 ft) ±10.5 m (34 ft) at (11.3693°N 142.5889°E) by direct CTD pressure measurements and a survey of the operating area by the support ship, the Deep Submersible Support Vessel DSSV Pressure Drop, with a Kongsberg SIMRAD EM124 multibeam echosounder system. The CTD measured pressure at 10,928 m (35,853 ft) of seawater depth was 1,126.79 bar (112.679 MPa; 16,342.7 psi). Due to a technical problem the (uncrewed) ultra-deep-sea lander Skaff used by the Five Deeps Expedition stayed on the bottom for two and half days before it was salvaged by the Limiting Factor (crew: Patrick Lahey, Pilot; Jonathan Struwe, DNV GL Specialist) from an estimated depth of 10,927 m (35,850 ft). The gathered data was published with the caveat that it was subject to further analysis and could possibly be revised in the future. The data will be donated to the GEBCO Seabed 2030 initiative. Later in 2019, following a review of bathymetric data, and multiple sensor recordings taken by the DSV Limiting Factor and the ultra-deep-sea landers Closp, Flere and Skaff, the Five Deeps Expedition revised the maximum depth to 10,925 m (35,843 ft) ±4 m (13 ft).

=== 2020 – Fendouzhe / Striver ===
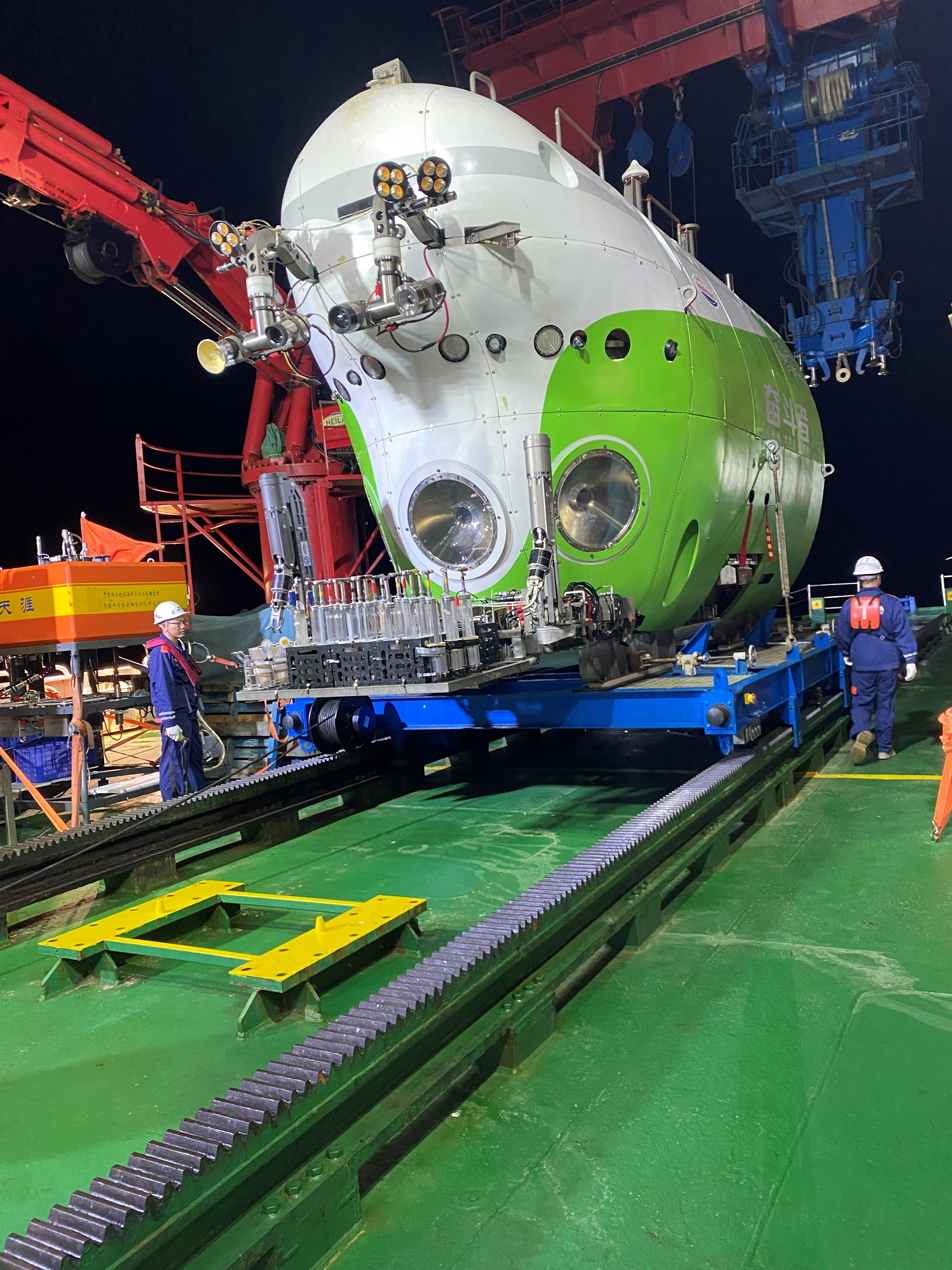
Fendouzhe aboard its mother ship Tansuo Yi Hao

Fendouzhe (simplified Chinese: 奋斗者; traditional Chinese: 奮鬥者; pinyin: Fèndòuzhě; trans. "Striver") is a manned Chinese deep-sea submersible developed by the China Ship Scientific Research Center (CSSRC). Between 10 October and 28 November 2020, it carried out thirteen dives in the Mariana Trench as part of a test programme. Of these, eight led to depths of more than 10,000 m (32,808 ft). On 10 November 2020, the bottom of the Challenger Deep was reached by Fendouzhe with three Chinese scientists (Zhāng Wěi 张伟 [pilot], Zhào Yáng 赵洋, and Wáng Zhìqiáng 王治强) onboard whilst live-streaming the descent to a reported depth of 10,909 m (35,791 ft). This makes the Fendouzhe the fourth manned submersible vehicle achieving a successful descent. The pressure hull of Fendouzhe, made from a newly developed titanium alloy, offers space for three people in addition to technical equipment. Fendouzhe is equipped with cameras made by the Norwegian manufacturer Imenco. According to Ye Cong 叶聪, the chief designer of the submersible, China's goals for the dive aren't just scientific investigation but also the future use of deep-sea seabed resources.

=== Ring of Fire Expeditions ===
==== 2020 – Ring of Fire Expedition / DSV Limiting Factor ====
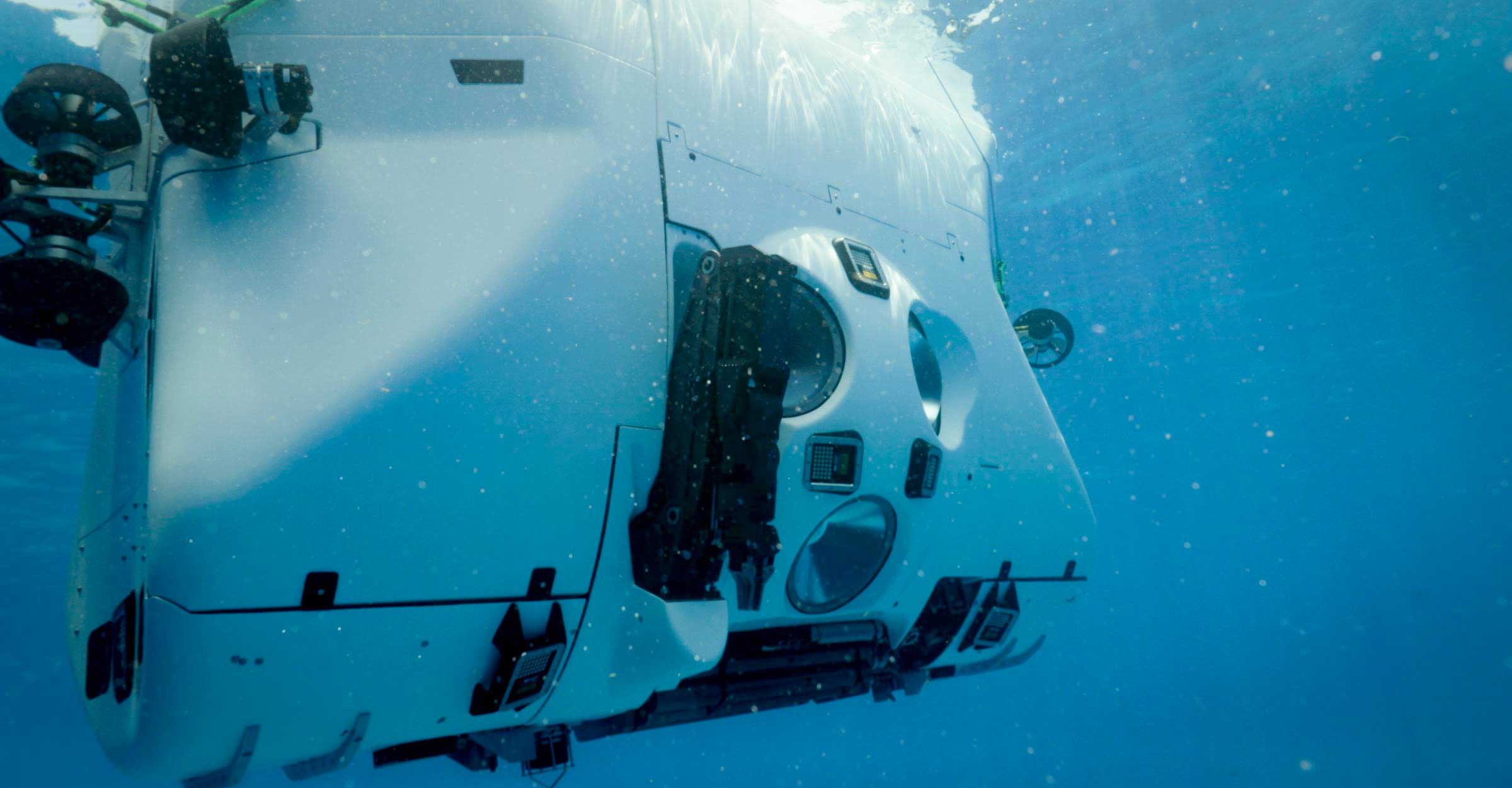
DSV Limiting Factor floating on the water surface

Caladan Oceanic's "Ring of Fire" expedition in the Pacific included six manned descents and twenty-five lander deployments into all three basins of the Challenger Deep all piloted by Victor Vescovo and further topographical and marine life survey of the entire Challenger Deep. The expedition craft used are the Deep Submersible Support Vessel DSSV Pressure Drop, Deep-Submergence Vehicle DSV Limiting Factor and the ultra-deep-sea landers Closp, Flere and Skaff. During the first manned dive on 7 June 2020 Victor Vescovo and former US astronaut (and former NOAA Administrator) Kathryn D. Sullivan descended to the "Eastern Pool" of the Challenger Deep in the Deep-Submergence Vehicle Limiting Factor.

On 12 June 2020, Victor Vescovo and mountaineer and explorer Vanessa O'Brien descended to the "Eastern Pool" of the Challenger Deep spending three hours mapping the bottom. O'Brien said her dive scanned about a mile of desolate bottom terrain, finding that the surface is not flat, as once was thought, but sloping by about 18 ft (5.5 m) per mile, subject to verification. On 14 June 2020, Victor Vescovo and John Rost descended to the "Eastern Pool" of the Challenger Deep in the Deep-Submergence Vehicle Limiting Factor spending four hours at depth and transiting the bottom for nearly 2 miles. On 20 June 2020, Victor Vescovo and Kelly Walsh descended to the "Western Pool" of the Challenger Deep in the Deep-Submergence Vehicle Limiting Factor spending four hours at the bottom. They reached a maximum depth of 10,923 m (35,837 ft). Kelly Walsh is the son of the Trieste's captain Don Walsh who descended there in 1960 with Jacques Piccard. On 21 June 2020, Victor Vescovo and Woods Hole Oceanographic Institution researcher Ying-Tsong Lin descended to the "Central Pool" of the Challenger Deep in the Deep-Submergence Vehicle Limiting Factor. They reached a maximum depth of 10,915 m (35,810 ft) ±4 m (13 ft). On 26 June 2020 Victor Vescovo and Jim Wigginton descended to the "Eastern Pool" of the Challenger Deep in the Deep-Submergence Vehicle Limiting Factor.

==== 2021 – Ring of Fire 2 Expedition / DSV Limiting Factor ====
On 28 February 2021 Caladan Oceanic's "Ring of Fire 2" expedition arrived over the Challenger Deep and conducted manned descents and lander deployments into the Challenger Deep. At the start the (uncrewed) ultra-deep-sea lander Skaff was deployed to collect water column data by CTD for the expedition. The effects of the Pacific subducting plate crashing into the Philippine Plate was among the things researched onsite. On 1 March 2021, the first manned descent to the eastern pool was made by Victor Vescovo and Richard Garriott. Garriott became the 17th person to descend to the bottom. On 2 March 2021, a descent to the eastern pool was made by Victor Vescovo and Michael Dubno. On 5 March a descent to the eastern pool was made by Victor Vescovo and Hamish Harding. They traversed the bottom of Challenger Deep. On 11 March 2021 a descent to the Western Pool was made by Victor Vescovo and marine botanist Nicole Yamase. On 13 April 2021 a descent was made by deep water submersible operations expert Rob McCallum and Tim Macdonald who piloted the dive. A 2021 descent with a Japanese citizen is planned. All manned descents were conducted in the Deep-Submergence Vehicle DSV Limiting Factor.

==== 2022 - Ring of Fire 3 Expedition / DSV Limiting Factor ====
In July 2022 for the fourth consecutive year, Caladan Oceanic's deep submergence system, consisting of the deep submersible DSV Limiting Factor supported by the mother ship DSSV Pressure Drop, returned to the Challenger Deep for dives into the Challenger Deep. In early July 2022, Victor Vescovo was joined by Aaron Newman as a mission specialist for a dive into the Central pool. On 5 July 2022, Tim Macdonald as pilot and Jim Kitchen as mission specialist for a dive into the Eastern pool. On 8 July 2022 Victor Vescovo was joined by Dylan Taylor as mission specialist for a dive into the Eastern pool. Victor Vescovo (for his 15th dive into the Challenger Deep) was joined by geographer and oceanographer Dawn Wright as mission specialist on the 12 July 2022 dive to 10,919 m (35,823 ft) in the Western Pool. Wright operated the world's first sidescan sonar to ever operate at full-ocean depth to capture detailed imagery along short transects of the southern wall of the Western Pool.

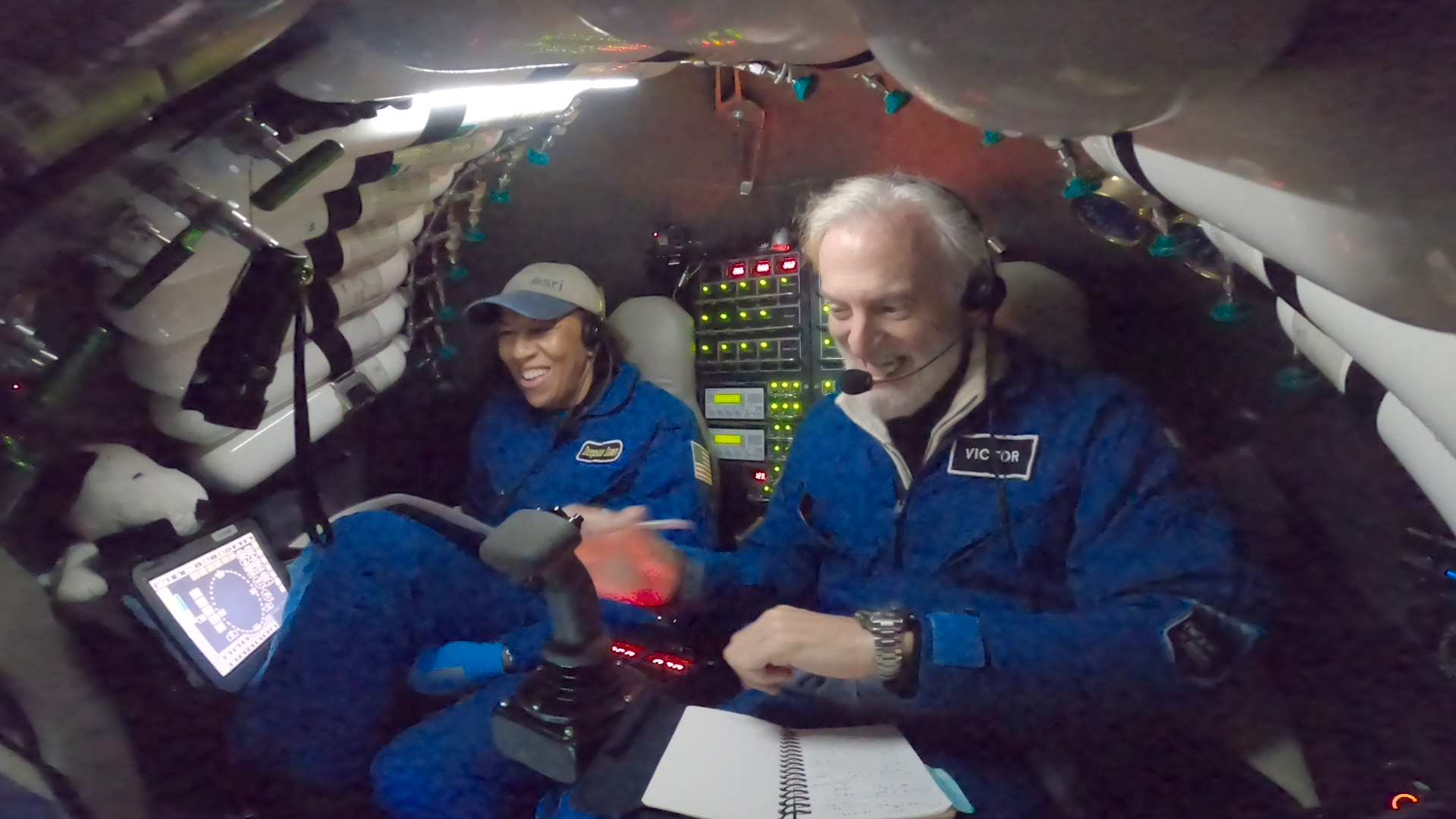
Dawn Wright and Victor Vescovo aboard DSV Limiting Factor during their July 2022 dive into the Western Pool

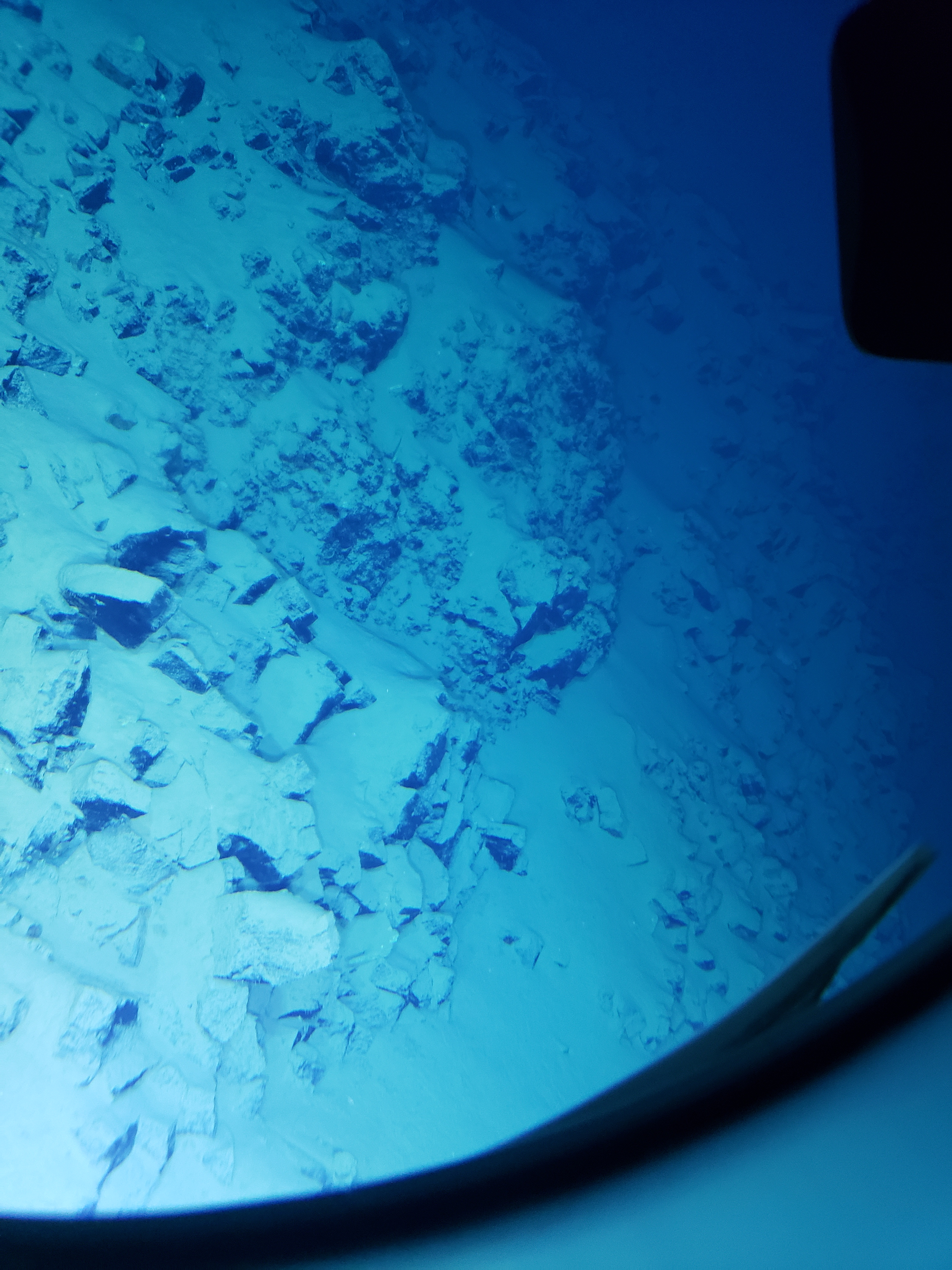
Southern wall of the Western Pool

== Uncrewed descents ==
=== 1996 and 1998 – Kaikō ===
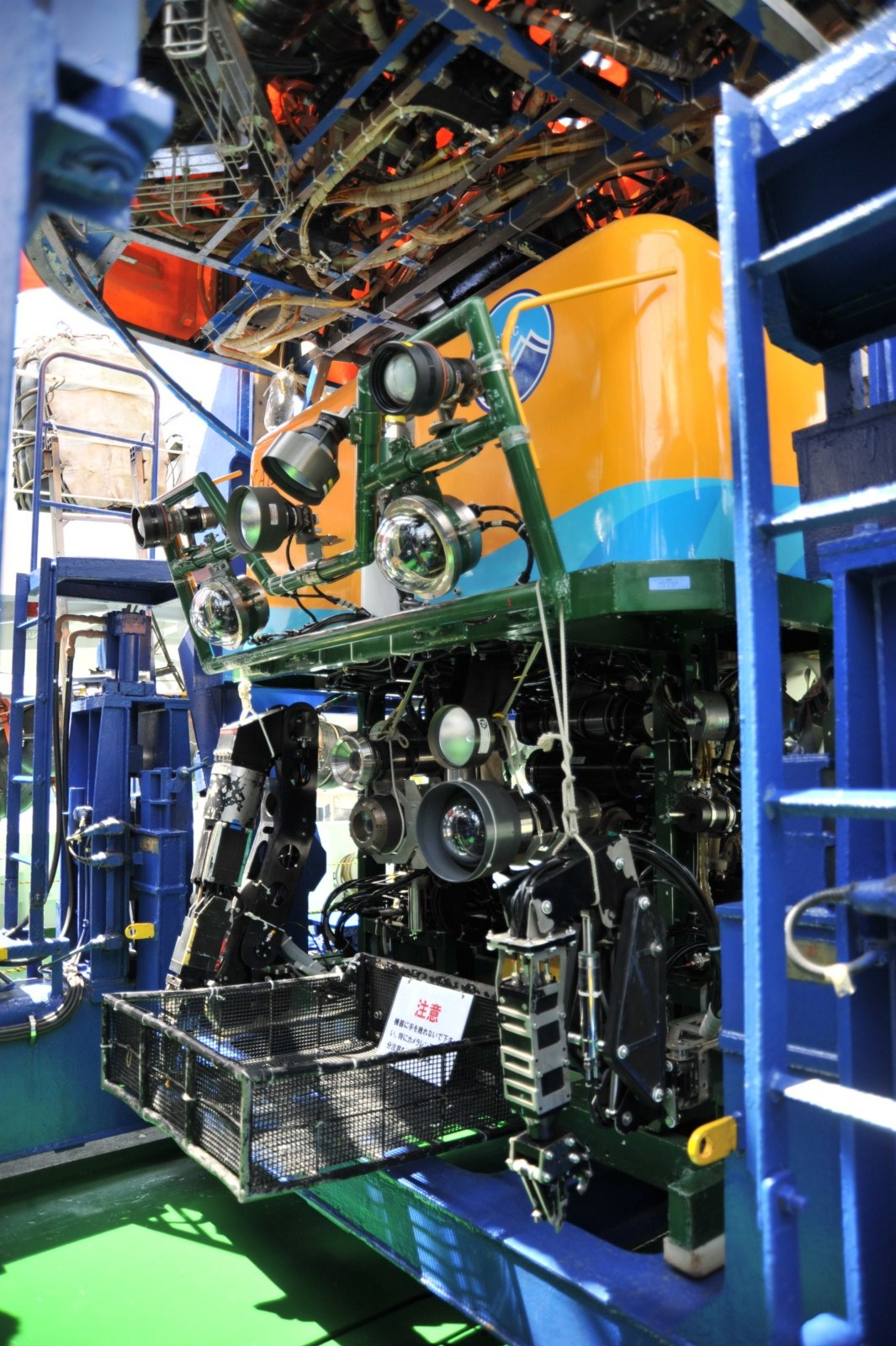
The Kaikō 7000II ROV in position under its launcher, aboard the deep sea research ship RV Kairei

The remotely operated vehicle (ROV) Kaikō made many uncrewed descents to the Mariana Trench from its support ship RV Yokosuka during two expeditions in 1996 and 1998. From 29 February to 4 March the ROV Kaiko made three dives into the central basin, Kaiko #21 – Kaiko #23, . Depths ranged from 10,898 metres (35,755 ft) at 11°22.536′N 142°26.418′E, to 10,896 metres (35,748 ft) at 11°22.59′N 142°25.848′E; dives #22 & #23 to the north, and dive #21 northeast of the deepest waters of the central basin. During the 1996 measurements the temperature (water temperature increases at great depth due to adiabatic compression), salinity and water pressure at the sampling station was 2.6 °C (36.7 °F), 34.7‰ and 1,113 bar (111.3 MPa; 16,140 psi), respectively at 10,897 m (35,751 ft) depth. The Japanese robotic deep-sea probe Kaikō broke the depth record for uncrewed probes when it reached close to the surveyed bottom of the Challenger Deep. Created by the Japan Agency for Marine-Earth Science and Technology (JAMSTEC), it was one of the few uncrewed deep-sea probes in operation that could dive deeper than 6,000 metres (20,000 ft). The manometer measured depth of 10,911.4 m (35,799 ft) ±3 m (10 ft) at 11°22.39′N 142°35.54′E for the Challenger Deep is believed to be the most accurate measurement taken up to then. Another source states the greatest depth measured by Kaikō in 1996 was 10,898 m (35,755 ft) at 11°22.10′N 142°25.85′E and 10,907 m (35,784 ft) at 11°22.95′N 142°12.42′E in 1998. The ROV Kaiko was the first vehicle to visit to the bottom of the Challenger Deep since the bathyscaph Trieste's dive in 1960, and the first success in sampling the trench bottom sediment/mud, from which Kaiko obtained over 360 samples. Approximately 3,000 different microbes were identified in the samples. Kaikō was lost at sea off Shikoku Island during Typhoon Chan-Hom on 29 May 2003.

=== 2009 – Nereus ===
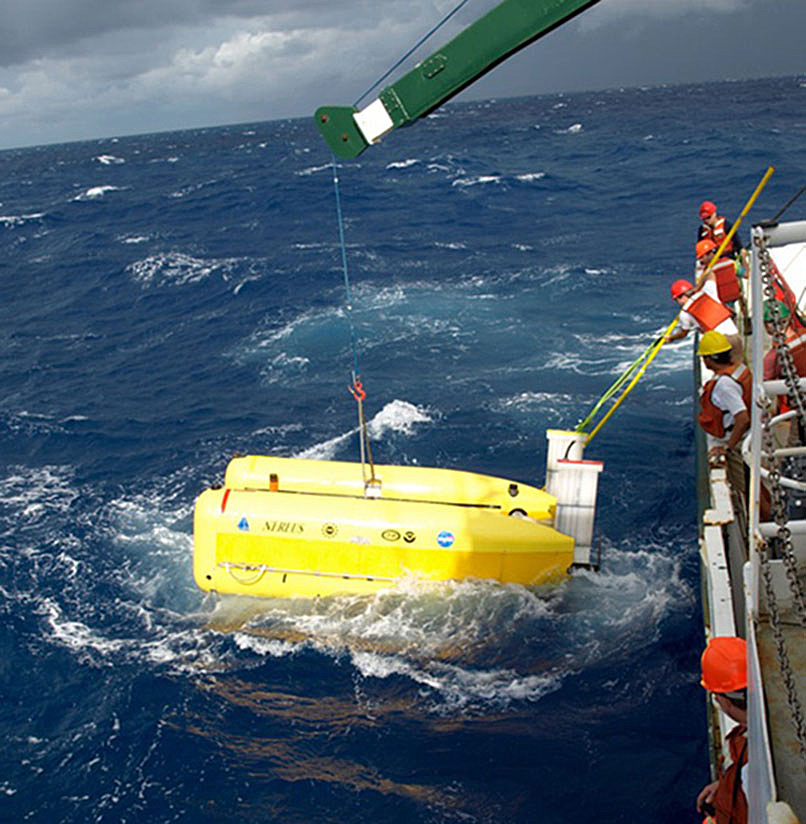
HROV Nereus

From 2 May to 5 June 2009, the RV Kilo Moana hosted the Woods Hole Oceanographic Institution (WHOI) hybrid remotely operated vehicle (HROV) Nereus team for the first operational test of the Nereus in its 3-ton tethered ROV mode. The Nereus team was headed by the Expedition Leader Andy Bowen of WHOI, Louis Whitcomb of Johns Hopkins University, and Dana Yoerger, also of WHOI. The expedition had co-chief scientists: biologist Tim Shank of WHOI, and geologist Patricia Fryer of the University of Hawaiʻi, to head the science team exploiting the ship's bathymetry and organizing the science experiments deployed by the Nereus. From Nereus dive #007ROV to 880 m (2,887 ft) just south of Guam, to dive #010ROV into the Nero Deep at 9,050 m (29,692 ft), the testing gradually increased depths and complexities of activities at the bottom.

Dive #011ROV, on 31 May 2009, saw the Nereus piloted on a 27.8-hour underwater mission, with about ten hours transversing the eastern basin of the Challenger Deep – from the south wall, northwest to the north wall – streaming live video and data back to its mothership. A maximum depth of 10,902 m (35,768 ft) was registered at 11°22.10′N 142°35.48′E. The RV Kilo Moana then relocated to the western basin, where a 19.3-hour underwater dive found a maximum depth of 10,899 m (35,758 ft) on dive #012ROV, and on dive #014ROV in the same area (11°19.59 N, 142°12.99 E) encountered a maximum depth of 10,176 m (33,386 ft). The Nereus was successful in recovering both sediment and rock samples from the eastern and the western basins with its manipulator arm for further scientific analysis. The HROV's final dive was about 80 nmi (148.2 km) to the north of the Challenger Deep, in the backarc, where they dived 2,963 m (9,721 ft) at the TOTO Caldera (12°42.00 N, 143°31.5 E). Nereus thus became the first vehicle to reach the Mariana Trench since 1998 and the deepest-diving vehicle then in operation. Project manager and developer Andy Bowen heralded the achievement as "the start of a new era in ocean exploration". Nereus, unlike Kaikō, did not need to be powered or controlled by a cable connected to a ship on the ocean surface. The HROV Nereus was lost on 10 May 2014 while conducting a dive at 9,900 metres (32,500 ft) in depth in the Kermadec Trench.

=== Near the Challenger Deep ===
==== 2008 – ABISMO ====
In June 2008, the Japan Agency for Marine-Earth Science and Technology (JAMSTEC) deployed the research vessel Kairei to the area of Guam for cruise KR08-05 Leg 1 and Leg 2. On 1–3 June 2008, during Leg 1, the Japanese robotic deep-sea probe ABISMO (Automatic Bottom Inspection and Sampling Mobile) on dives 11–13 almost reached the bottom about 150 km (93 mi) east of the Challenger Deep: "Unfortunately, we were unable to dive to the sea floor because the legacy primary cable of the Kaiko system was a little bit short. The 2-m long gravity core sampler was dropped in free fall, and sediment samples of 1.6m length were obtained. Twelve bottles of water samples were also obtained at various depths...". ABISMO's dive #14 was into the TOTO caldera (12°42.7777 N, 143°32.4055 E), about 60 nmi northeast of the deepest waters of the central basin of the Challenger Deep, where they obtained videos of the hydrothermal plume. Upon successful testing to 10,000 m (32,808 ft), JAMSTEC's ROV ABISMO became, briefly, the only full-ocean-depth rated ROV in existence. On 31 May 2009, the ABISMO was joined by the Woods Hole Oceanographic Institution's HROV Nereus as the only two operational full ocean depth capable remotely operated vehicles in existence. During the ROV ABISMO's deepest sea trails dive its manometer measured a depth of 10,257 m (33,652 ft) ±3 m (10 ft) in "Area 1" (vicinity of 12°43′N 143°33′E).

Leg 2, under chief scientist Takashi Murashima, operated at the Challenger Deep 8–9 June 2008, testing JAMSTEC's new full ocean depth "Free Fall Mooring System," i.e. a lander. The lander was successfully tested twice to 10,895 m (35,745 ft) depth, taking video images and sediment samplings at 11°22.14′N 142°25.76′E, in the central basin of the Challenger Deep.

==== 2016 – Haidou-1 ====
On 23 May 2016, the Chinese submersible Haidou-1 dived to a depth of 10,767 m (35,325 ft) at an undisclosed position in the Mariana Trench, making China the third country after Japan (ROV Kaikō), and the US (HROV Nereus), to deploy a full-ocean-depth ROV. This autonomous and remotely operated vehicle has a design depth of 11,000 m (36,089 ft).

==== 2020 – Vityaz-D ====
On 8 May 2020, the Russian submersible Vityaz-D dived to a depth of 10,028 m (32,900 ft) at an undisclosed position in the Mariana Trench.

== See also ==
- Emden Deep
- Horizon Deep
- Litke Deep, closest point to Earth's center
- Sirena Deep (formerly HMRG Deep)
- List of people who descended to Challenger Deep
