= Litke Deep =

Oceanic trench in the Arctic Ocean

Coordinates: 82°24′00″N 19°31′00″E

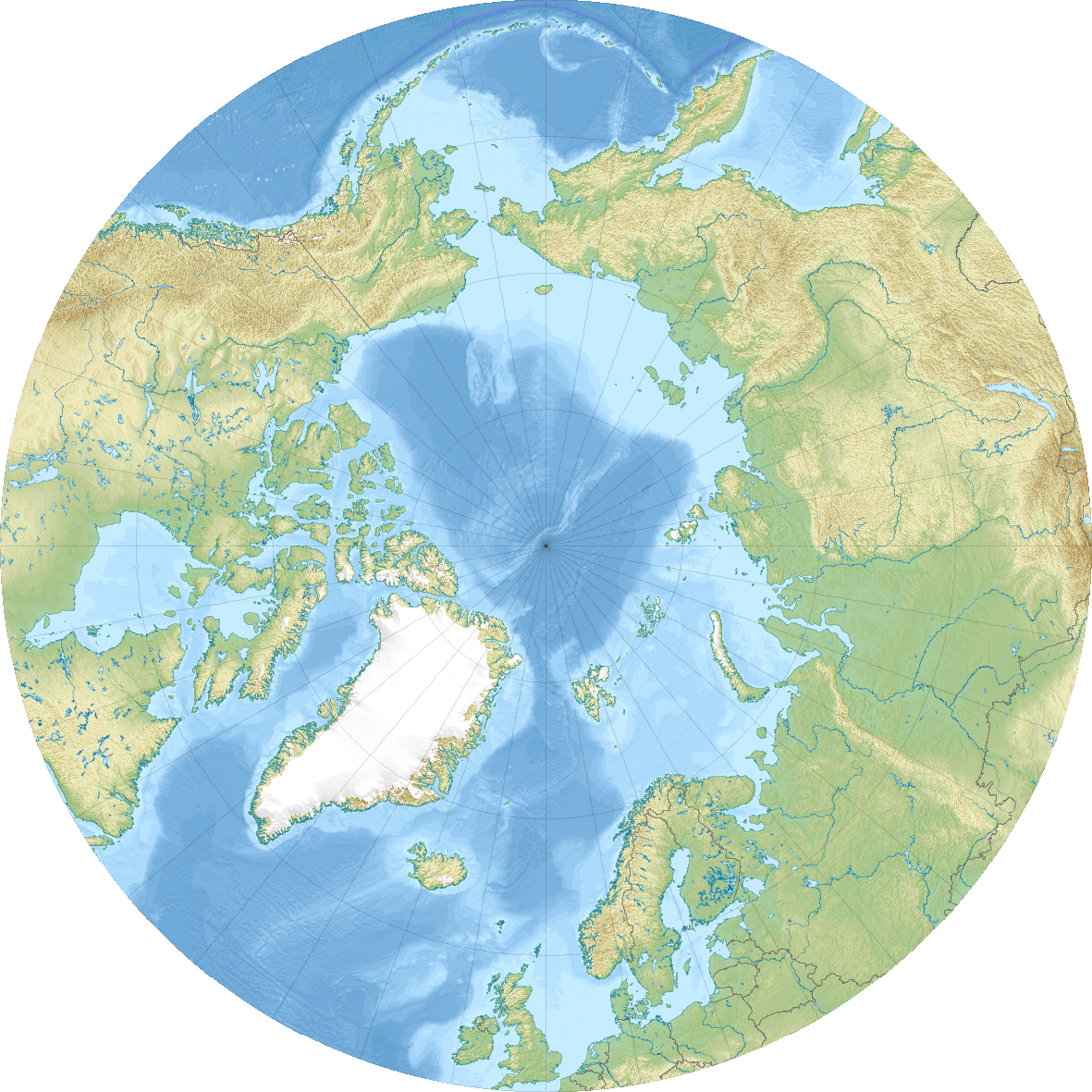
Location of deepest point in Litke Deep in the Arctic Ocean

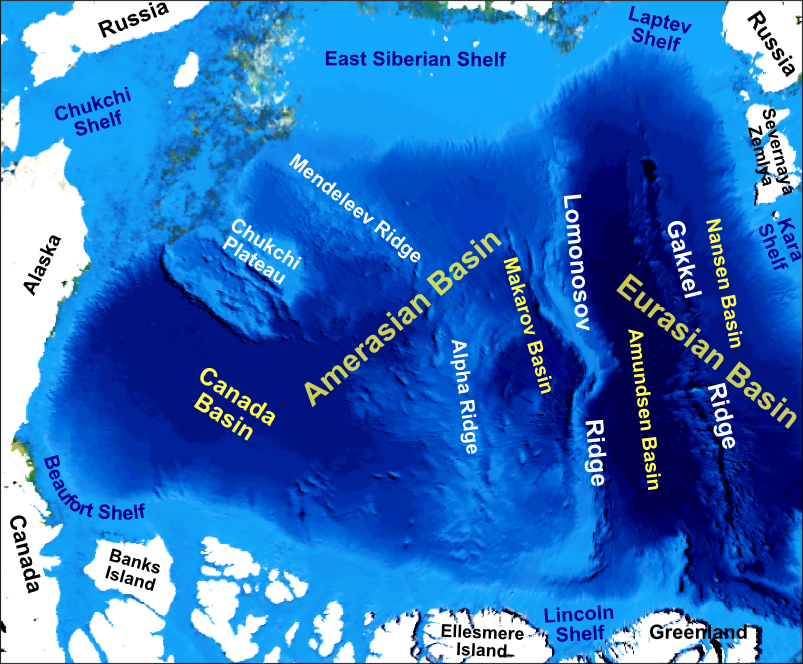
Arctic Ocean bathymetry

Litke Deep (Russian: Жёлоб Ли́тке) is a bathymetric feature in the Arctic Ocean. The deepest point is 5,449 m (17,877 ft) below sea level. It is the closest point of the upper surface of Earth's lithosphere to Earth's center, with Challenger Deep being 14.7268 km (9.2 mi) further from Earth's centre at a bathymetric depth of 6,366.4311 km (3,955.9 mi).

The deepest point in Litke Deep is the closest point on the Earth's surface to the Earth's center given that it is located along the planet's polar flattening. Based on average global sea level (mean sea level), the deepest point in Litke Deep is shallower than Challenger Deep. Litke Deep is the second deepest point in the Arctic Ocean after Molloy Deep.

== Topography ==
=== Location ===
The Litke Deep is located in the southwestern part of the Eurasian Basin, which stretches from northeastern part of Greenland past the Svalbard archipelago, Franz Josef Land and Severnaya Zemlya to the Taymyr Peninsula. It is situated south of the underwater ridge Gakkel Ridge roughly 350 kilometers northeast of Svalbard and roughly 220 km north of the island of Nordaustlandet. The deepest part is at 5,449 metres (17,881 feet) under sea level.

=== Closest point to Earth's center ===
The Challenger Deep is lower below sea level, but the Litke Deep is reported to be the closest point on the surface to Earth's center, with Molloy Deep a very close second.

The seabed at Litke Deep is the fixed point on Earth that has the least distance from the center – because of the oblate spheroid shape of the planet Earth, which is flatter at poles and thicker at the equator. Application of the formula at Earth radius shows that the Earth's radius is 14.7268 km (9 mi) lesser at Litke Deep than at Challenger Deep.

Litke Deep is closer to North Pole at 82°24’ N and the difference between Earth's diameter at poles and equator is greater than the depth at Challenger Deep (10,925 m (35,843 ft) below sea level), around 11°22' north, nearer to equator with sea level also having the difference. Despite being 5,475 m (17,963 ft) shallower in depth below sea level, it is 6,351.7043 km (3,946.8 mi) from the Earth's center, 14.7268 km (9 mi) nearer than the Challenger Deep (6,366.4311 km (3,955.9 mi) to the Earth's center). In this ranking, several other Arctic as well as Antarctic depths such as Molloy Deep, seabed at North Pole, Factorian Deep and Meteor Deep in Southern Ocean exceed Challenger Deep. However, by depth below sea level, Litke Deep is not the deepest point in the Arctic Ocean.

== Surveys ==
The Litke Deep was located in 1955 by the Russian icebreaker Fyodor Litke expedition. It is named after Russian explorer Fyodor Petrovich Litke.

== Descents ==
No crewed or unmanned descents have been undertaken to Litke Deep as of 2024.

== See also ==
- List of oceanic trenches
