= DSV Limiting Factor =

Crewed full ocean depth rated submersible

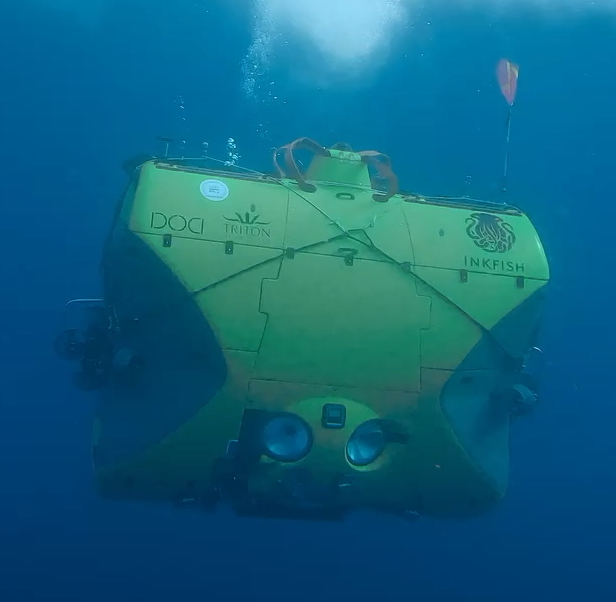

History

United States
- Name: Limiting Factor
- Operator: Caladan Oceanic LLC
- Builder: Triton Submarines LLC
- Cost: $37 million (USD)
- In service: 2018
- Status: In service

General characteristics
- Class & type: Triton 36000/2 crewed full ocean depth deep-submergence vehicle
- Displacement: 12,500 kg (27,600 lb) all up weight
- Propulsion: 10 ducted propeller fixed thrusters
- Speed: Lateral: 2–3 kn (3.4–5.1 ft/s; 1.0–1.5 m/s), Vertical: 1–2 kn (1.7–3.4 ft/s; 0.51–1.03 m/s)
- Endurance: 96 hours normal operations
- Test depth: 14,000 msw (46,000 fsw)
- Complement: Pilot and observer

Limiting Factor, known as Bakunawa since its sale in 2022, and designated Triton 36000/2 by its manufacturer, is a crewed deep-submergence vehicle (DSV) manufactured by Triton Submarines, built for and originally owned and operated (2018–2022) by explorer Victor Vescovo's ocean research firm, Caladan Oceanic, and currently owned and operated by Gabe Newell's Inkfish ocean-exploration research organization. It currently holds the records for the deepest crewed dives in all five oceans. Limiting Factor was commissioned by Victor Vescovo for $37 million and operated by his marine research organization, Caladan Oceanic, between 2018 and 2022. It is commercially certified by DNV for dives to full ocean depth, and is operated by a pilot, with facilities for an observer.

The vessel was used in the Five Deeps Expedition, becoming the first crewed submersible to reach the deepest point in all five oceans. Over 21 people have visited Challenger Deep, the deepest area on Earth, in the DSV. Limiting Factor was used to identify the wrecks of the destroyers USS Johnston at a depth of 6,469 m (21,224 ft), and USS Samuel B. Roberts at 6,865 m (22,523 ft), in the Philippine Trench, the deepest dives on wrecks. It has also been used for dives to the French submarine Minerve (S647) at about 2,350 m (7,710 ft) in the Mediterranean sea, and RMS Titanic at about 3,800 m (12,500 ft) in the Atlantic.

== Design and construction ==
The submersible is based on a spherical titanium pressure hull for two occupants, seated side by side, which has three wide angle acrylic viewports in front of the crew, one in front of each seat, and one below and between them. If the bow is defined as the side in which the viewports are mounted, the vessel is wider than it is long.

The vessel is equipped with a manipulator arm on the starboard side of the pressure hull, a system to drop ballast, and a cluster of five, fixed direction, ducted propeller, marine thrusters at each of the port and starboard ends of the outer hull for propulsion and maneuvering, as can be seen in the photographs. These thrusters provide three-axis translational motion and two-axis (yaw and roll) rotation.

The vessel is commercially certified for unlimited full ocean depth operations by DNV.

The Limiting Factor normally operates from a dedicated support vessel, DSSV Pressure Drop, but can also be operated from other suitably equipped vessels.

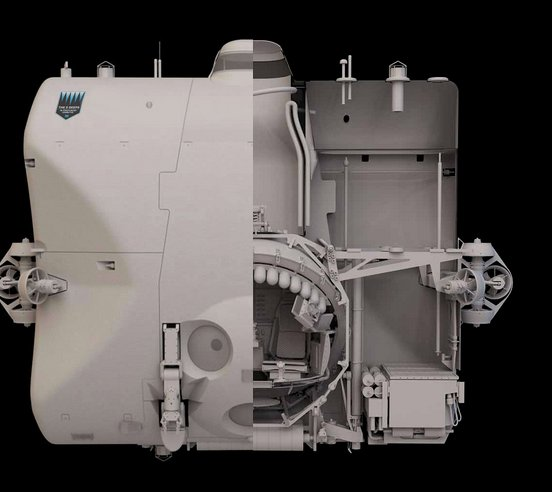
Limiting Factor CAD rendering cutaway view

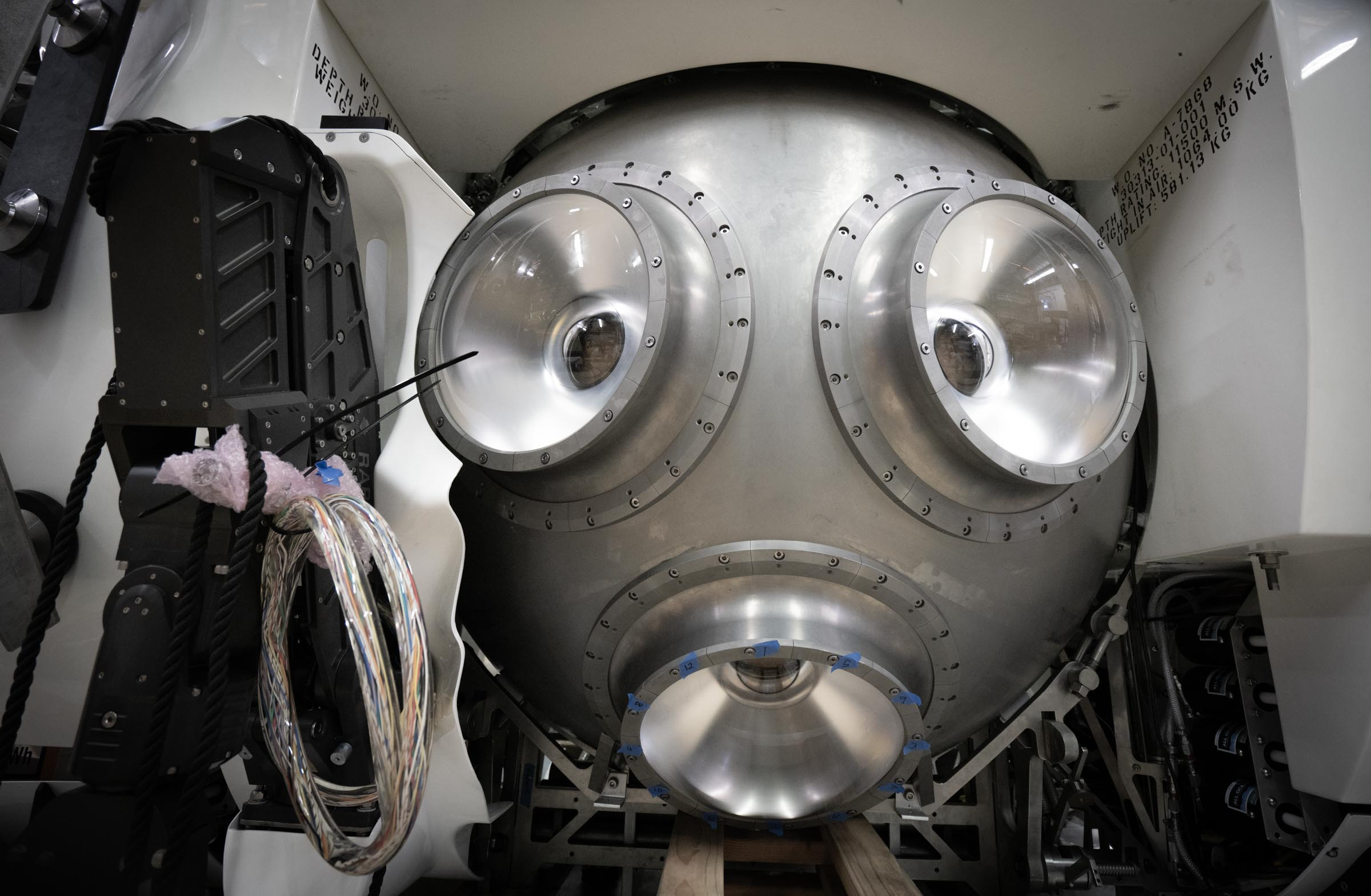
The titanium pressure hull during construction, with the acrylic viewports installed and the manipulator arm partly installed.

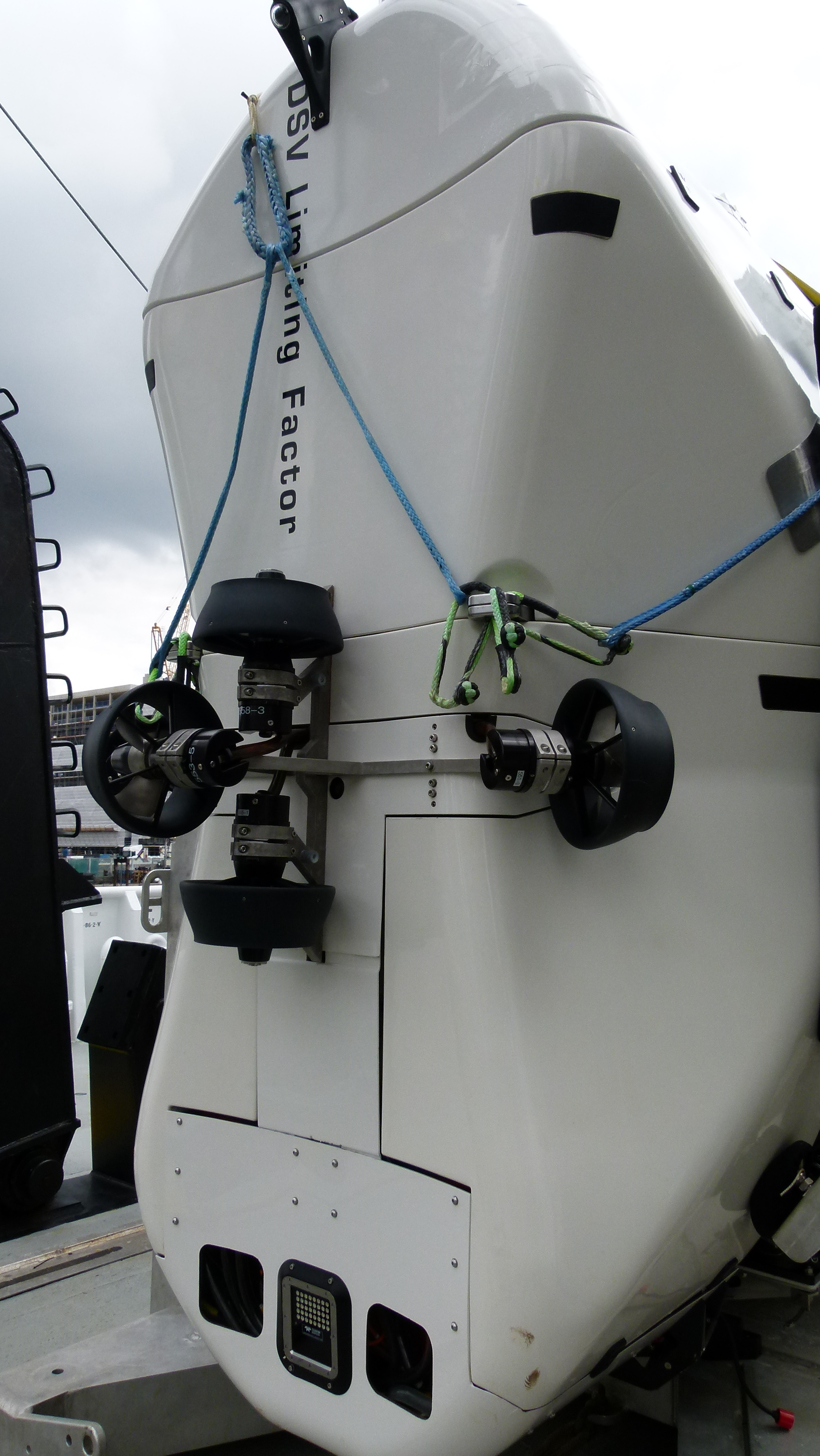
View of the port side

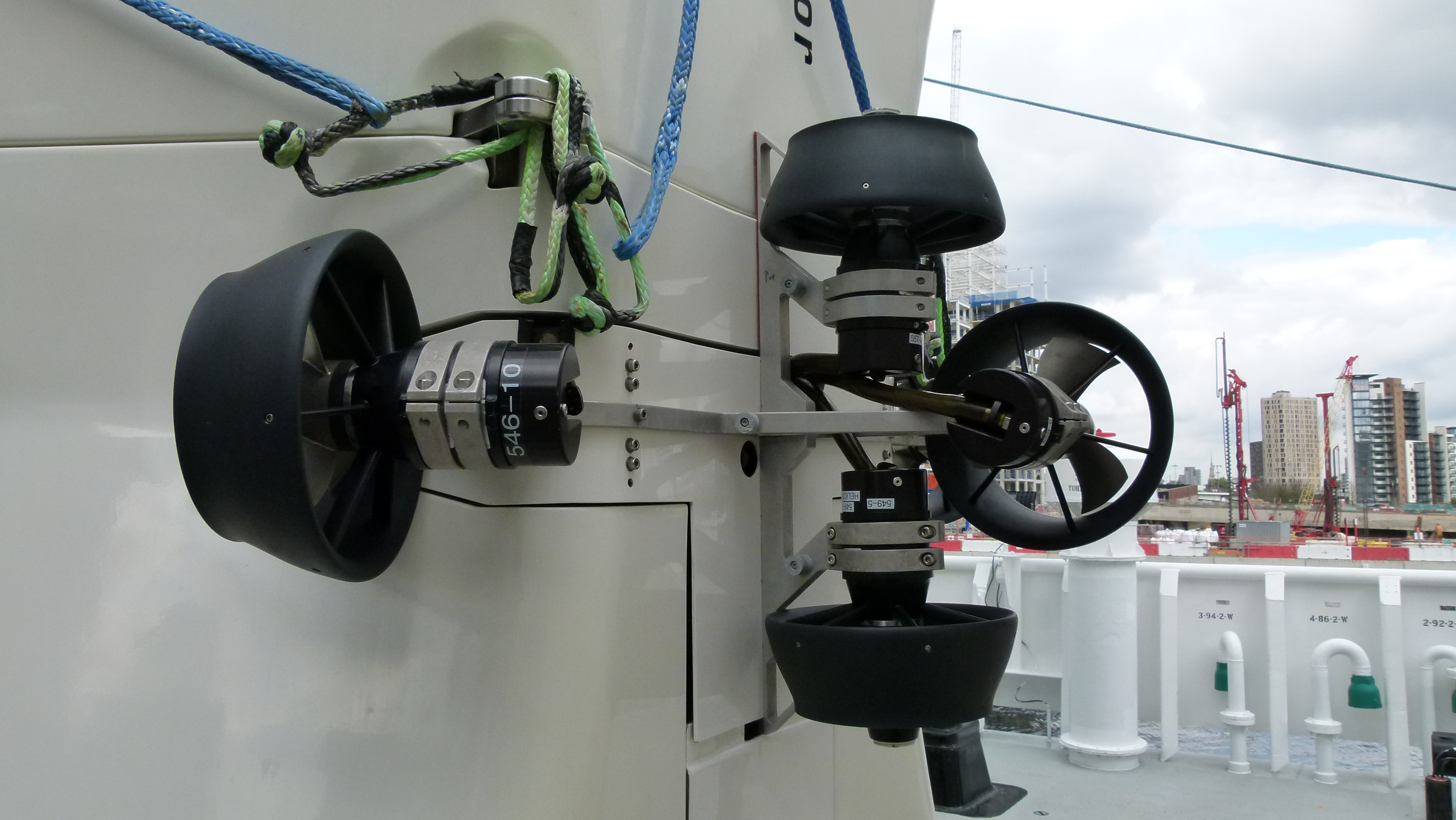
Detail of the Limiting Factor's port thruster group.

=== Specifications ===
==== Operational limits ====
The vessel is certified by DNV for a maximum dive depth of 11,000 m (36,000 ft), exceeding that of the Challenger Deep, the ocean's deepest known point. It can withstand a tested pressure of 14,000 msw (46,000 fsw, 1,400 bar, 20,000 psi), significantly exceeding the certified pressure and affording a large margin of safety. The 36000/2 is commercially rated for repeated dives to full ocean depth.

==== Principal dimensions ====
The vessel is unusual in that it can travel on three primary axes, and in practice does a large amount of traveling vertically. If one uses the direction in which the occupants look out on the surroundings through physical windows to define the bow, it is wider than it is long. Alternatively it may be considered to have a bow at either end of the long axis, depending on the direction of motion at the time, like a proa. The long horizontal axis is 4.6 m (15 ft), while the short horizontal axis extent is only 1.9 m (6 ft 3 in). The height is 3.7 m (12 ft).

==== Masses, weights and volumes ====
- Mass = 12,500 kg (27,600 lb)
- Dry weight = 11,700 kg (25,800 lb)
- Variable ballast = up to 500 kg (1,100 lb) dive weights, and 100 kg (220 lb) trim weights
- Payload = approximately 220 kg (490 lb)

The vessel is operated by a pilot, and has seating for an observer

==== Buoyancy ====
- Surface ballast = 2,150 L (76 ft^{3})
- Syntactic foam buoyancy is used

==== Structure ====
The pressure hull is a 1,500 mm (59 in) inside diameter by 90 mm (3.5 in) thick grade 5 titanium (Ti-6Al-4V ELI) alloy sphere machined to within 99.933% of spherical (for enhanced buckling stability). The sphere was built as two forged titanium domes that interlock with o-ring seals. The structure is certified for repeated dives to full ocean depth. The hydrodynamic fairing of the outer surface shell is non-structural and removable for access to equipment.

==== Performance ====
- Endurance = 16 hours +96 hours on emergency systems
- Speed = 1 to 2 kn (1.7 to 3.4 ft/s; 0.5 to 1.0 m/s) vertical, 2 to 3 kn (3.4 to 5.1 ft/s; 1.0 to 1.5 m/s) lateral
- Hull form configuration has been optimized for vertical travel, as much of the traveling time will be spent ascending and descending through the water column

==== Power ====
The vessel is operated from a dual 24 V battery power supply and emergency supply, which can be jettisoned in an emergency. The main battery stores 65 kW·h.

==== Propulsion ====
There are 4 × 5.5 kW (7.4 hp) horizontal propulsion thrusters (main thrusters), 4 × 5.5 kW vertical thrusters, and 2 × 5.5 kW maneuvering thrusters, mounted in two clusters at the opposite extremes of the long dimension. These can each be jettisoned if they become fouled on an obstruction, allowing the vessel to break free in an emergency.

=== Manipulator ===
The DSV is fitted with a single Kraft Telerobotics "Raptor" hydraulically powered 7-function manipulator with force feedback, at the starboard side of the pressure hull.

=== Ergonomics, safety, and life support ===
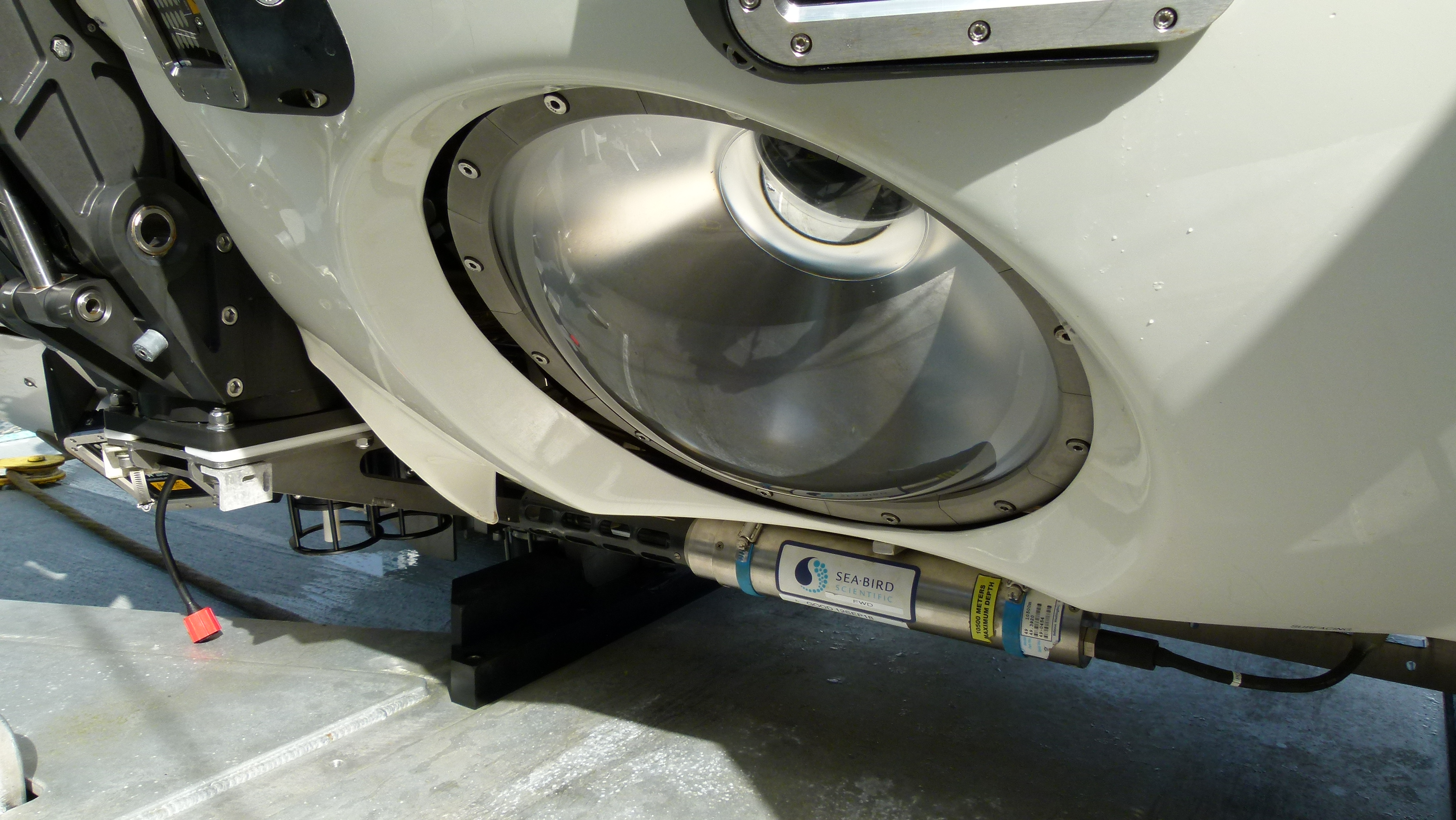
The lower viewport and CTD probe

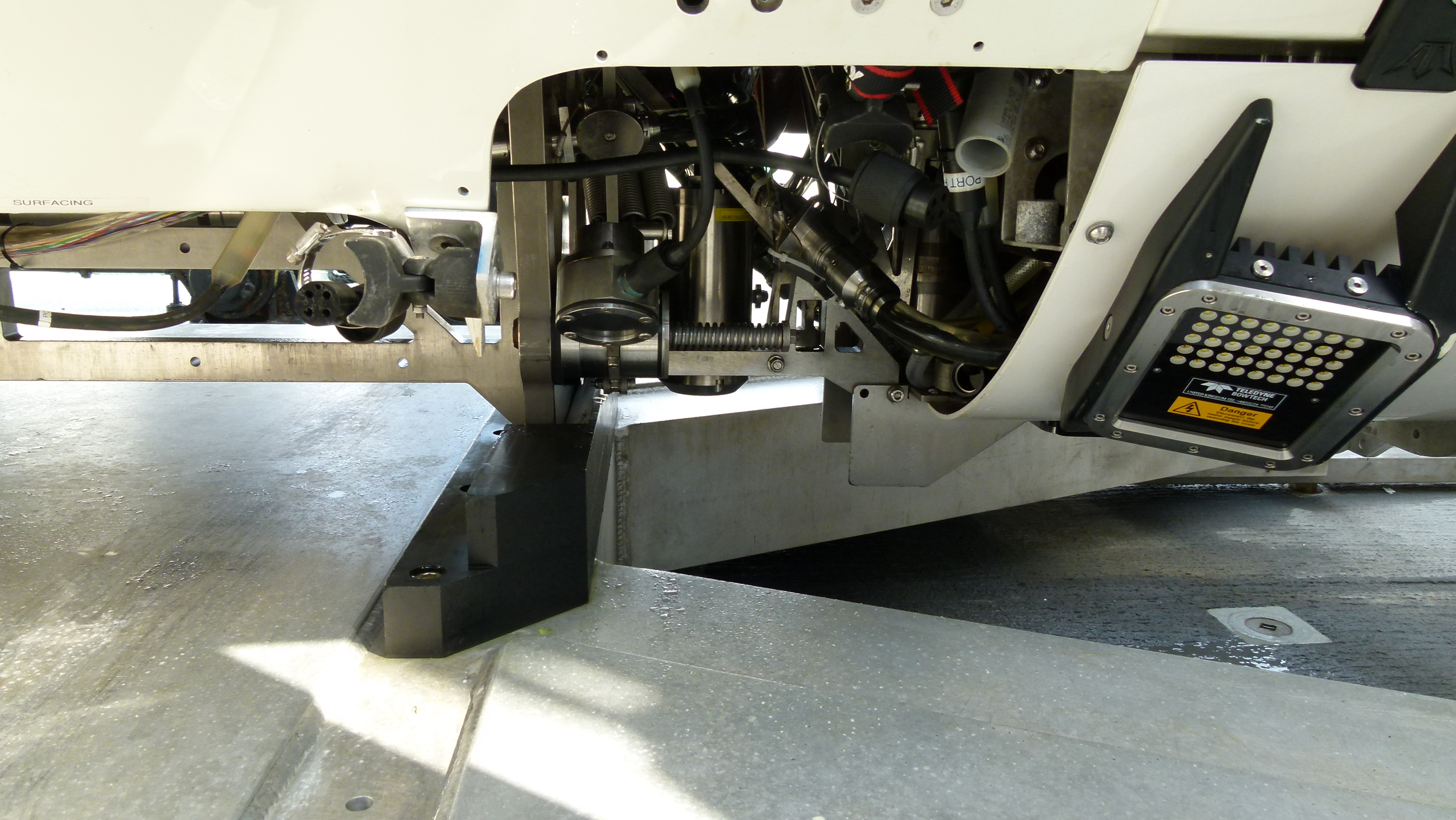
Detail view of the dive weight release mechanism and one of the LED light panels

The forward and downward view through the three ultra-wide angle acrylic viewports is unobstructed by structure or appendages, and illuminated by ten externally mounted high output LED lighting panels of 20,000 lumens each. The limited direct field of view through the ports is augmented by an array of four full ocean depth capable low-light cameras. Four high definition cameras are also provided to record missions.

Maneuvering is by control joystick, touch screen and manual override.

The cabin is temperature and humidity controlled, and the life support system uses carbon dioxide scrubbers and oxygen replenishment. Emergency life support is rated for 96 hours. All routine maintenance can be done using standard tools. Emergency release systems are provided for the batteries, so they can be jettisoned if they fail dangerously, and for the thrusters and manipulator arm, in case they get snagged on an obstacle which could prevent the vessel from surfacing.

=== Deployment and recovery ===
Launch and recovery from DSSV Pressure Drop is by a hydraulic luffing (tilting) A-frame over the transom. The vessel is stowed on deck in a cradle.

=== Name ===
The naming of these vessels is a large tip of the hat to, and with no small amount of admiration for, Iain M Banks' brilliant "Culture" science fiction series.

— Victor Vescovo

In Iain M. Banks' novel The Player of Games, the General Offensive Unit (demilitarised) Limiting Factor is the sapient warship provided to the main character Jernau Morat Gurgeh for transport to the Empire of Azad to take part in a board game tournament. It is nominally demilitarised, but retains part of its main armament.

After the sale of the submersible to the research group Inkfish in 2022, it was renamed Bakunawa after the Filipino mythological creature Bakunawa.

== Sale ==
The DSV and support vessel DSSV Pressure Drop were sold in 2022 for an undisclosed amount to Gabe Newell's Inkfish ocean-exploration research organisation. The sale included a Kongsberg EM124 multibeam echo-sounder and three robot landers.

Inkfish plans to use the HES system to continue exploring the ocean depths, led by Prof Alan Jamieson of the University of Western Australia, who was chief scientist on most of Vescovo's expeditions.

The DSV was renamed to Bakunawa and the support vessel to Dagon.

== Expeditions as DSV Limiting Factor ==
=== Five Deeps Expedition ===
In 2018, Victor Vescovo launched the Five Deeps Expedition, with the objective of visiting the deepest points of all five of the world's oceans, and mapping the vicinity, by the end of September 2019. This expedition was filmed in the documentary television series Expedition Deep Ocean. This objective was achieved one month ahead of schedule, and the expedition's team carried out biological samplings and depth confirmations at each location. Besides the deepest points of the five world oceans, the expedition also made dives in the Horizon Deep and the Sirena Deep, and mapped the Diamantina fracture zone.

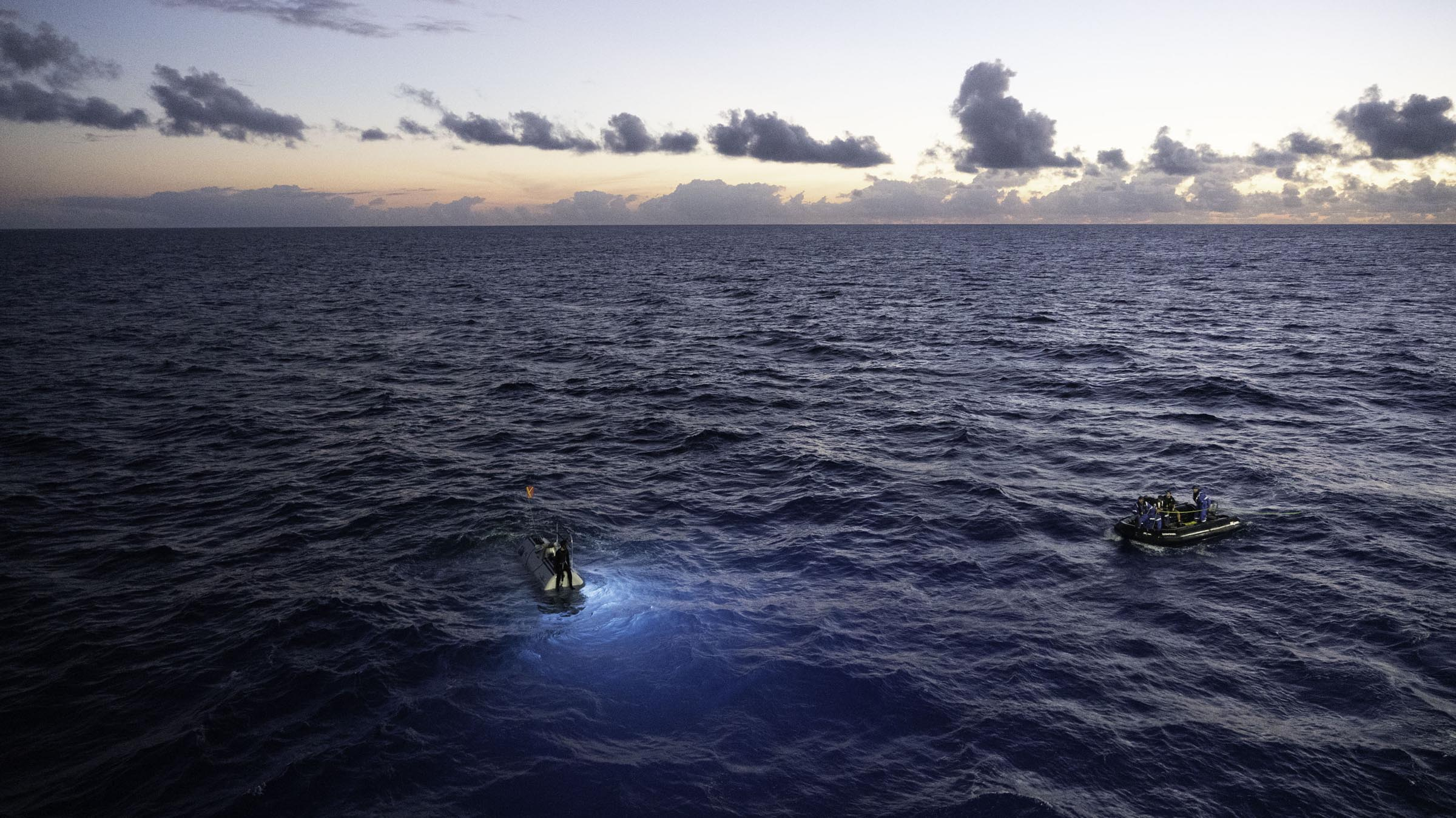
Limiting Factor at the surface after a dive into the Puerto Rico Trench

In December 2018, the Limiting Factor became the first piloted vessel to reach the deepest point of the Atlantic Ocean, 8,376 m (27,480 ft) below the ocean surface to the bottom of the Puerto Rico Trench, an area subsequently referred to by world media as Brownson Deep.

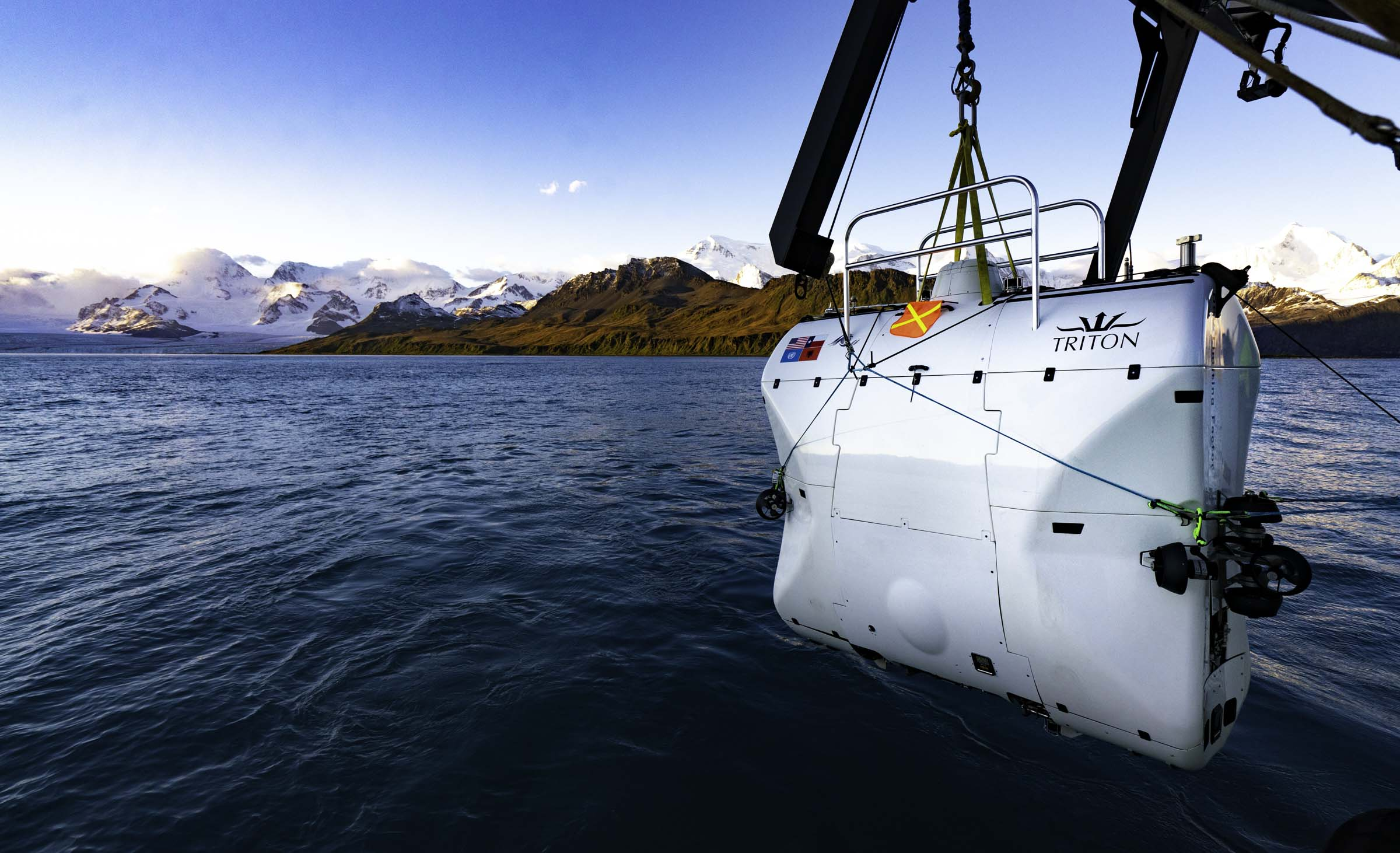
DSV Limiting Factor at South Georgia Island

Flags on the side of DSV Limiting Factor. Clockwise from upper left: Flags of the United States, Texas, Albania, the United Nations.

On 4 February 2019, Vescovo piloted Limiting Factor to the bottom of the South Sandwich Trench, the deepest part of the Southern Ocean, becoming the first person and first vessel to reach that point. In preparation for this dive, the expedition used a Kongsberg EM124 multibeam sonar system for accurate mapping of the trench.

On 16 April 2019, Vescovo piloted Limiting Factor to the bottom of the Sunda Trench south of Bali, Indonesia, reaching the deepest point of the Indian Ocean. The team reported sightings of what they believed to be previously unknown species, including a hadal snailfish and a gelatinous organism believed to be a stalked ascidian. The same dive was later undertaken by Patrick Lahey, President of Triton Submarines, and the expedition's chief scientist, Dr. Alan Jamieson. This dive was organised subsequent to the scanning of the Diamantina Fracture Zone using multibeam sonar, confirming that the Sunda Trench was deeper and settling the debate about where the deepest point in the Indian Ocean is.

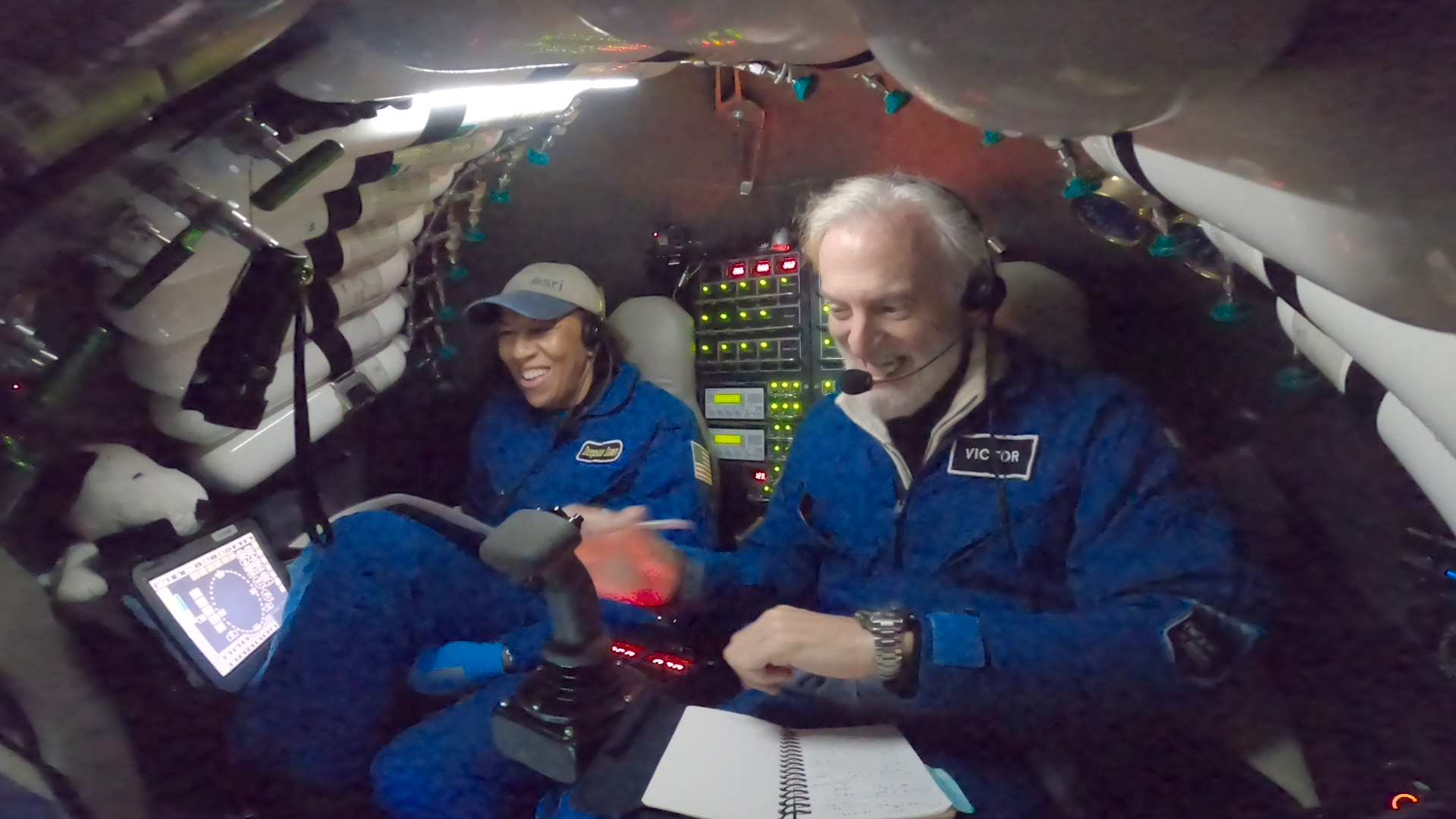
Dawn Wright and Victor Vescovo on a dive at Challenger Deep

On 28 April 2019, Vescovo descended nearly 11 km (7 mi) in Limiting Factor to the deepest place in the World – the Challenger Deep in the Pacific Ocean's Mariana Trench. On his first descent, he piloted the DSV Limiting Factor to a depth of 10,928 m (35,853 ft), a world record by 16 m (52 ft). This depth was corrected by postprocessing of the data from the DSV and the three lander units which were used to measure temperature, density and salinity profiles of the water column observed at the dive site, and estimated gravity gradient variations, water level, and atmospheric pressure, giving a corrected value of 10,935m(+-6m) at 11°22.3′, 142°35.3′E. The depth is calculated from acoustic altimeter profiles referenced to in-situ pressure. Diving for a second time on 1 May, he became the first person to dive the Challenger Deep twice, finding "at least three new species of marine animals" and "some sort of plastic waste". Among the underwater creatures Vescovo encountered were a snailfish at 26,250 ft (8,000 m) and a spoon worm at nearly 23,000 ft (7,000 m), the deepest level at which the species had ever been encountered.

On 7 May 2019, Vescovo and Jamieson, in Limiting Factor, made the first human-occupied deep submersible dive to the bottom of the Sirena Deep, the third deepest point in the ocean, about 128 mi (206 km) northeast of Challenger Deep. They spent 176 minutes at the bottom, and among the samples they retrieved was a piece of mantle rock from the western slope of the Mariana Trench.

On 10 June 2019, Vescovo piloted Limiting Factor to the bottom of the Horizon Deep in the Tonga Trench, confirming that it is the second deepest point of the World ocean and the deepest in the Southern Hemisphere at 10,823 m (35,509 ft). In doing so, Vescovo and Limiting Factor had descended to the first, second, and third deepest points in the ocean. Unlike the Sunda and Mariana Trenches, no signs of human contamination were found at Horizon Deep, which was described by the expedition as "completely pristine".

Vescovo completed the Five Deeps Expedition on 24 August 2019 when he piloted Limiting Factor to a depth of 5,550 m (18,210 ft) at the bottom of the Molloy Deep in the Arctic Ocean.

=== USS Johnston ===
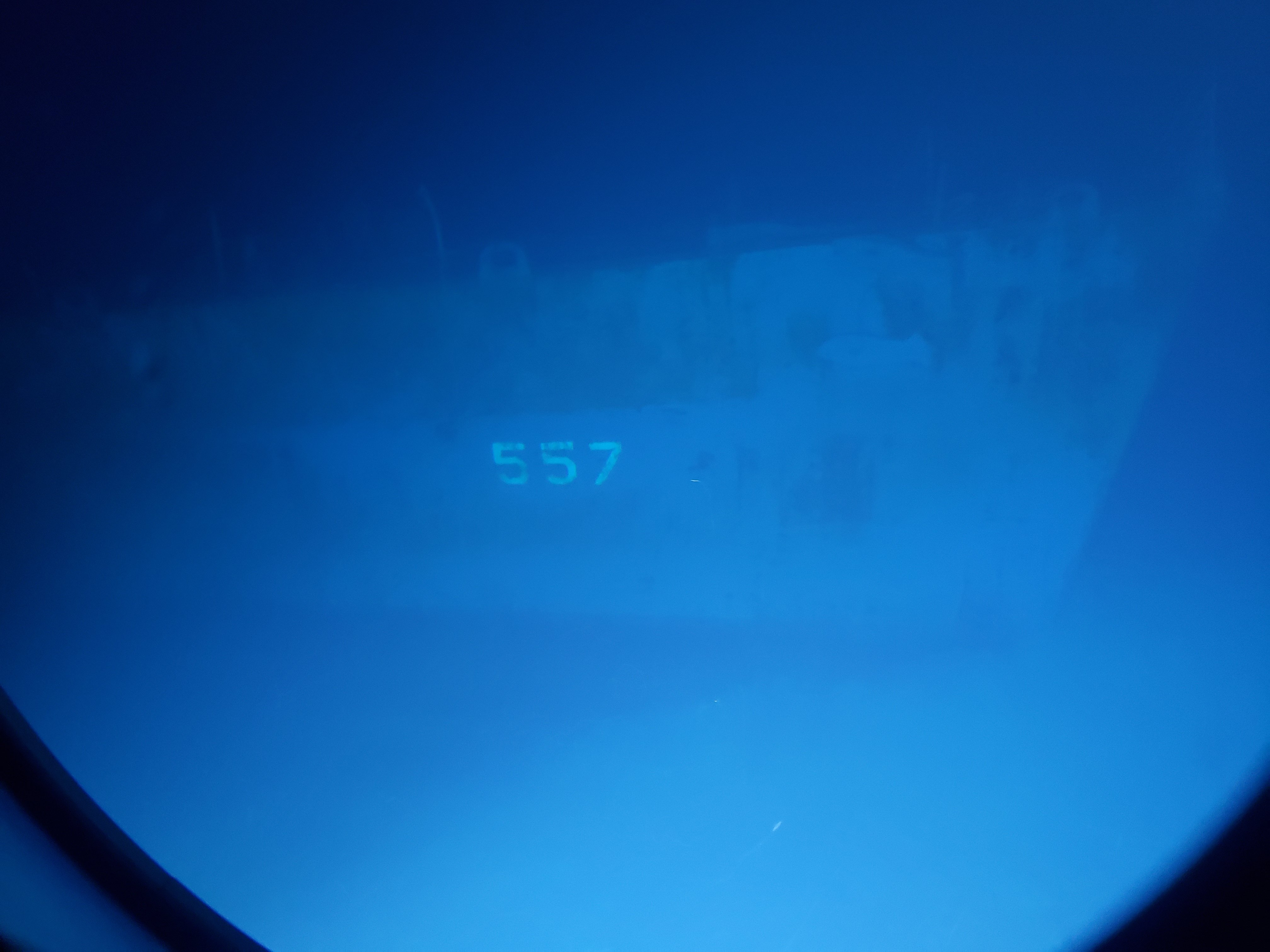
Starboard bow of the wreck of USS Johnston (DD-557)

USS Johnston (DD-557) was a Fletcher-class destroyer built for the United States Navy during World War II. On 25 October 1944, while assigned as part of the escort to six escort carriers, Johnston, two other Fletcher-class destroyers, and four destroyer escorts were engaged by a large Imperial Japanese Navy flotilla. In what became known as the Battle off Samar, Johnston and the other escort ships charged the Japanese ships to protect nearby US carriers and transport craft. After engaging several Japanese capital ships and a destroyer squadron, Johnston was sunk by gunfire, with 187 dead. The wreck was discovered on 30 October 2019 but was not properly identified until March 2021. Lying more than 20,000 ft (3.8 mi; 6,100 m) below the surface of the ocean, it was the deepest shipwreck ever surveyed until the discovery of USS Samuel B. Roberts on 22 June 2022.

On 30 October 2019, the Petrel, a research vessel belonging to Vulcan Inc., discovered the remains of what was believed to be Johnston near the bottom of the Philippine Trench. The remains consisted of a deck gun, a propeller shaft, and some miscellaneous debris that could not be used to identify the wreck, but additional debris was observed lying deeper than the ship's ROV could go. On 31 March 2021, the Limiting Factor piloted by Victor Vescovo, surveyed and photographed the deeper wreckage and definitively identified it as Johnston. The wreck lies upright and is well preserved at a depth of 21,180 ft (4.011 mi; 6,460 m). Until Samuel B. Roberts was discovered on 22 June 2022, Johnston was the deepest identified shipwreck in the world.

=== USS Samuel B. Roberts ===
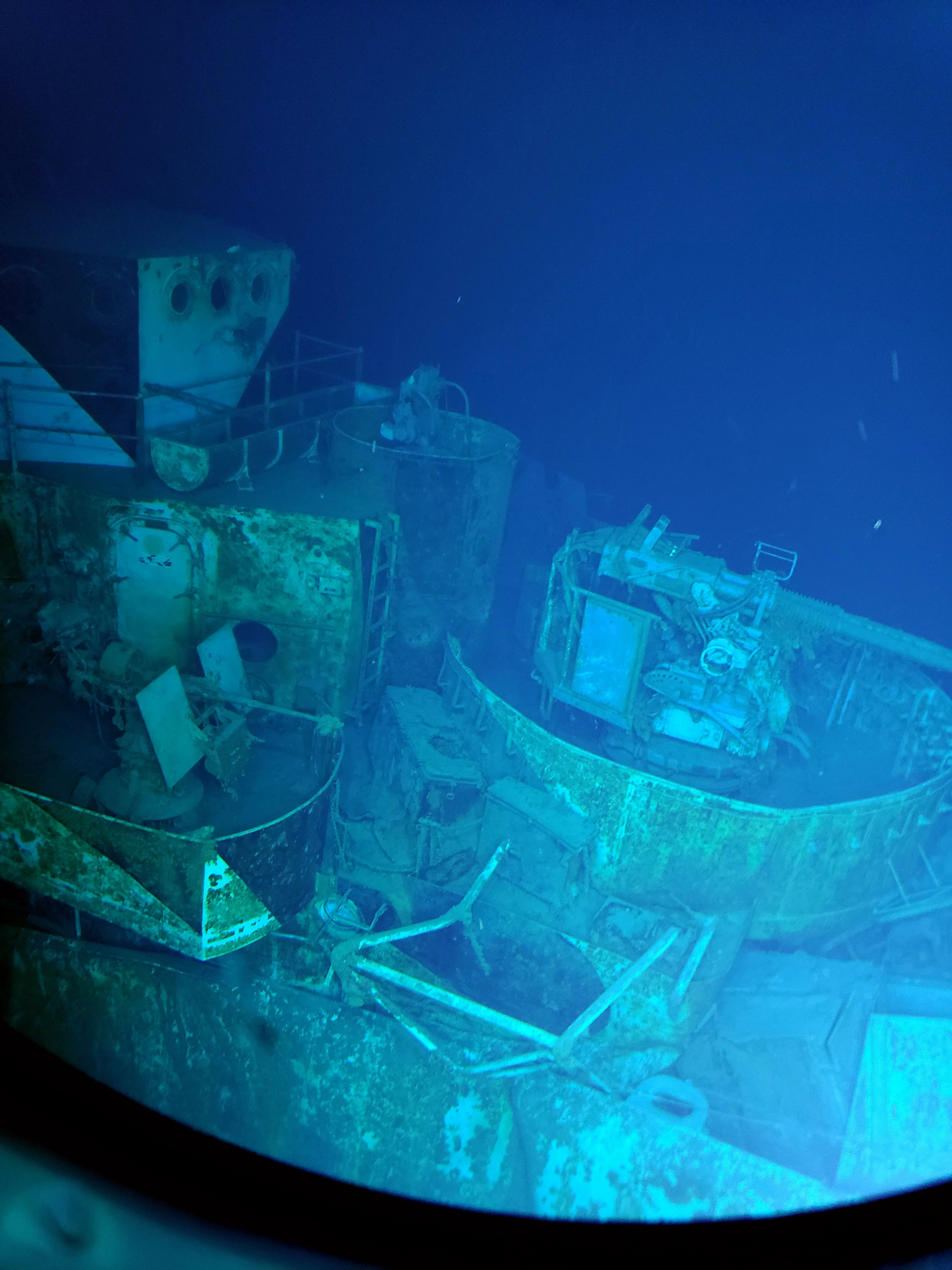
Pilot house and 40 mm gun mount

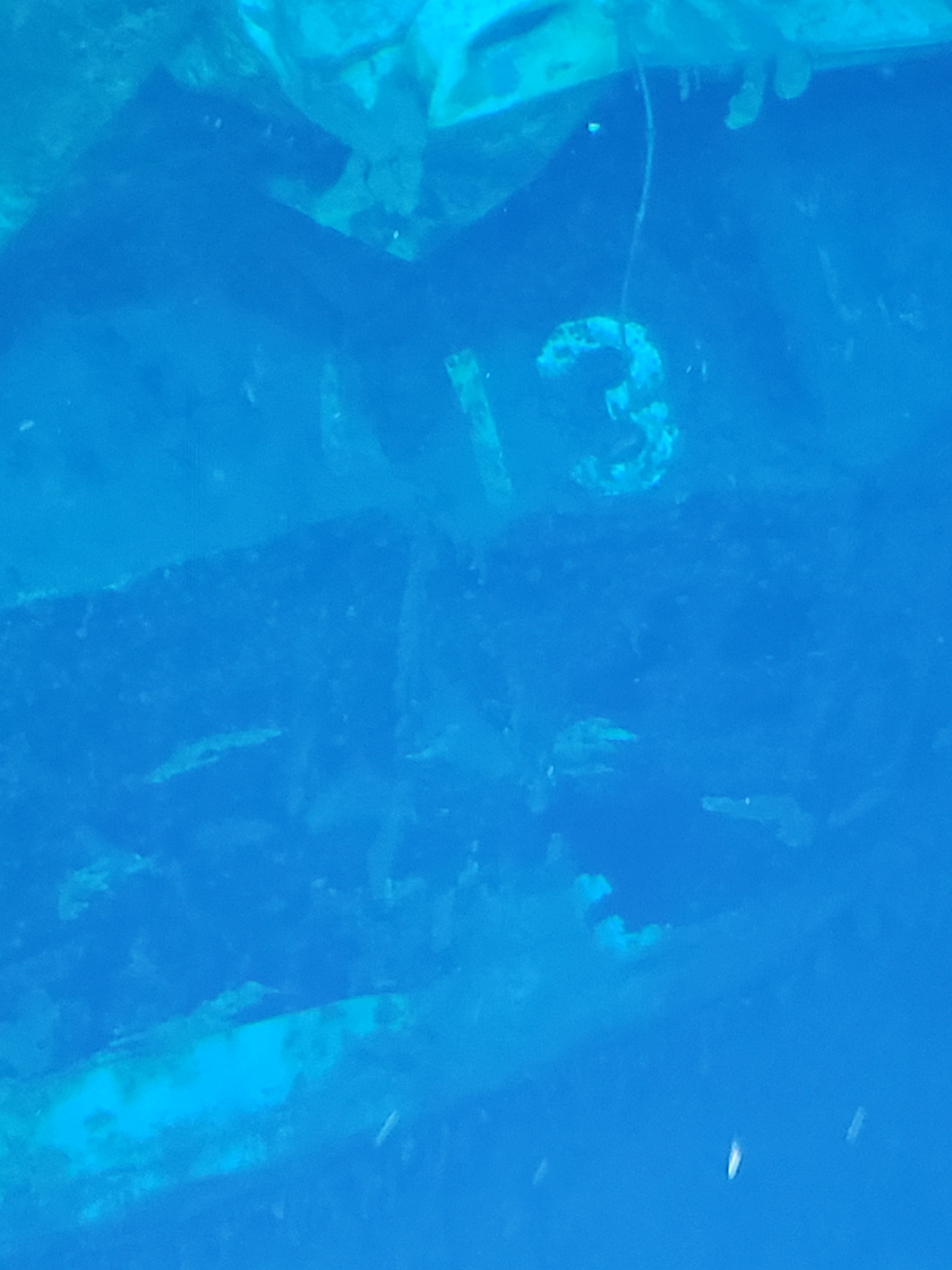
Pennant number 413 still visible

USS Samuel B. Roberts (DE-413) was a destroyer escort of the United States Navy that served in World War II and was sunk in the Battle off Samar, in which a small force of U.S. warships prevented a superior Imperial Japanese Navy force from attacking the amphibious invasion fleet off the Philippine island of Leyte. The ship was part of a relatively light flotilla of destroyers, destroyer escorts, and escort carriers called "Taffy 3" which was inadvertently left to fend off a fleet of heavily armed Japanese battleships, cruisers, and destroyers off the island of Samar during the Battle off Samar, one of the engagements making up the larger Battle of Leyte Gulf of October 1944. Steaming through incoming shells, Samuel B. Roberts scored one torpedo hit and several shell hits on larger enemy warships before she was sunk. As of June 2022, it is the deepest shipwreck discovered.

An exploration team led by Victor Vescovo and made up of personnel of Caladan Oceanic and EYOS Expeditions discovered the wreck of Samuel B. Roberts in June 2022. The team found, identified, and surveyed the wreck during a series of six dives from 17 to 24 June 2022. The team found that the wreck reached the seabed in one piece, although it hit the sea floor bow first and with enough force to cause some buckling, and observed that the ship's stern had separated from the rest of the hull by about 5 m (16 ft). They reported that they had found evidence of damage to the ship inflicted by a Japanese battleship shell, including the vessel's fallen mast. The wreck lies at a depth of 6,865 m (22,523 ft; 4.266 mi), making it the deepest wreck ever identified. It exceeds the previous record of 6,469 m (21,224 ft; 4.020 mi), set in March 2021 when Vescovo's team found and identified the wreck of the destroyer USS Johnston, which was sunk in the same battle.

=== French submarine Minerve ===
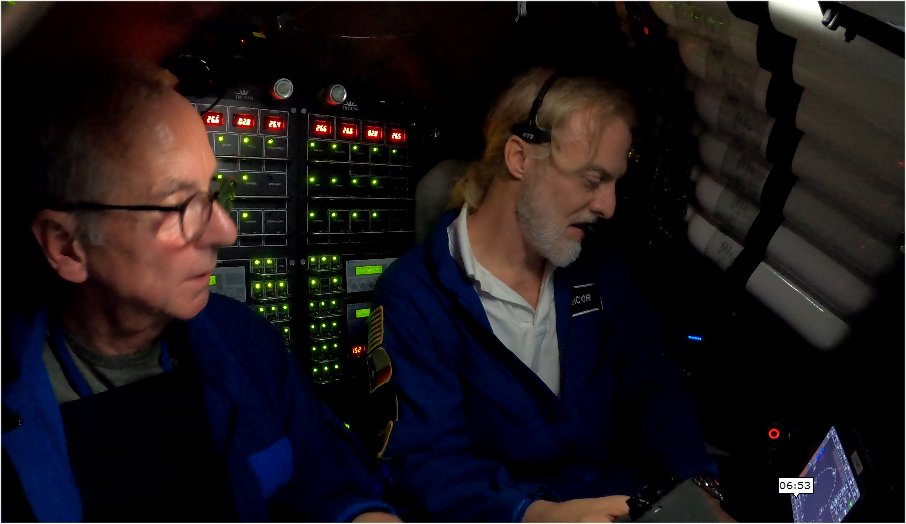
Victor Vescovo (right), and Admiral Jean-Louis Barbier (French Navy, retired), investigating the wreck of SS Minerve in February 2020

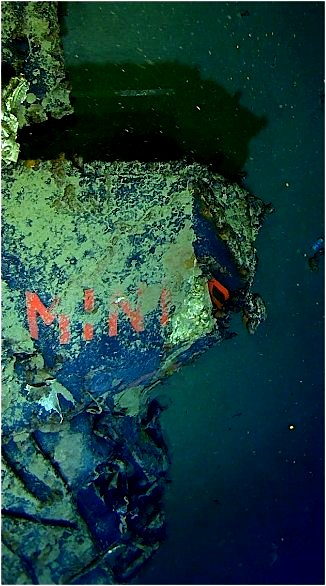
Photograph taken by an exterior high-definition camera on the DSSV Limiting Factor during its dive on the wreck of the French submarine Minerve (S647). The piece of wreckage is from the sail, showing the letters "MIN" and partial letters "E" and "R" that positively identify the wreck.

The French Daphne-class diesel–electric submarine Minerve was lost with all hands in bad weather while returning to her home port of Toulon in January 1968.

Minerve was one of four submarines lost to unknown causes in 1968 along with the Soviet submarine K-129, the American USS Scorpion, and Israeli submarine INS Dakar. The French government started a new search for Minerve on 4 July 2019 in deep waters about 45 km (28 mi) south of Toulon. The location of the wreck was found on 21 July 2019 by the company Ocean Infinity using the search ship Seabed Constructor. The wreck was found at a depth of 2,350 m (7,710 ft), broken into three main pieces scattered over 300 m (980 ft) along the seabed. Although Minerve's sail was damaged, it was possible to positively identify the wreckage. as the letters "MINE" and "S" (from Minerve and S647, respectively) were still readable on the hull.

In December 2019, Vescovo proposed a dive on the wreck of the Minerve in the Limiting Factor. On the first dive, 1 February 2020, Vescovo dived with retired French Rear Admiral Jean-Louis Barbier, to gather new information on the cause of the loss. On the second dive, 2 February, Vescovo piloted while Hervé Fauve, the son of the submarine's commanding officer, sat in the second seat. At the bottom they placed a granite memorial plaque on a section of Minerve's hull at a depth of over 2,370 m (7,780 ft)

== Expeditions as DSV Bakunawa ==
=== Nova Canton Expedition ===
On 16 April 2024, pilot Kate Wawatai and Heather Stewart, in Bakunawa, made the first all-woman deep submersible dive to a depth of 8,000 m (26,000 ft) at the bottom of the Nova-Canton Trough, part of the Clarion-Clipperton zone. During the 10-hour dive, the team studied how geological features such as fracture zones act as pathways for deep ocean currents.

== Gallery ==
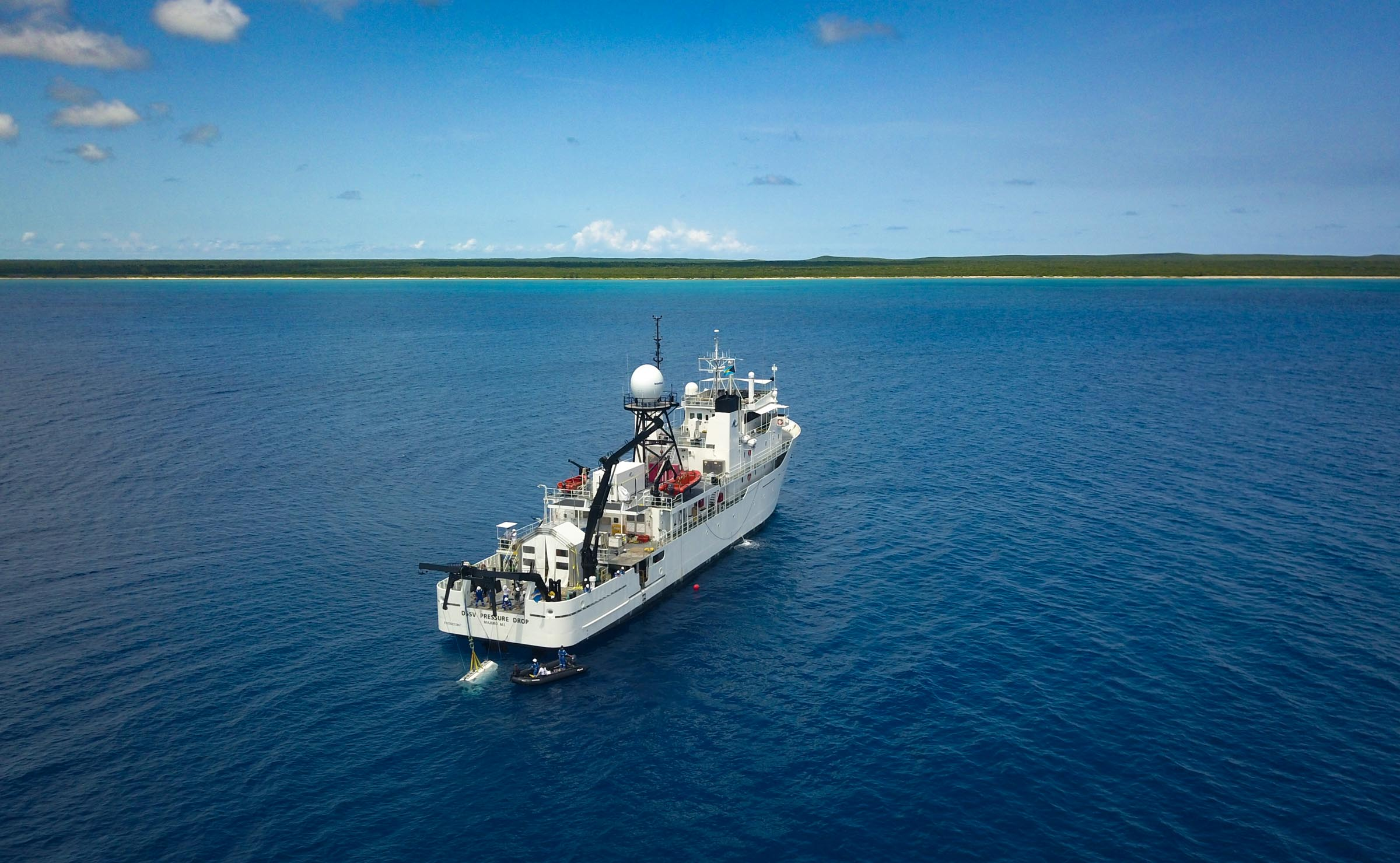
Aerial view of the mothership and the submersible during the Bahama trials

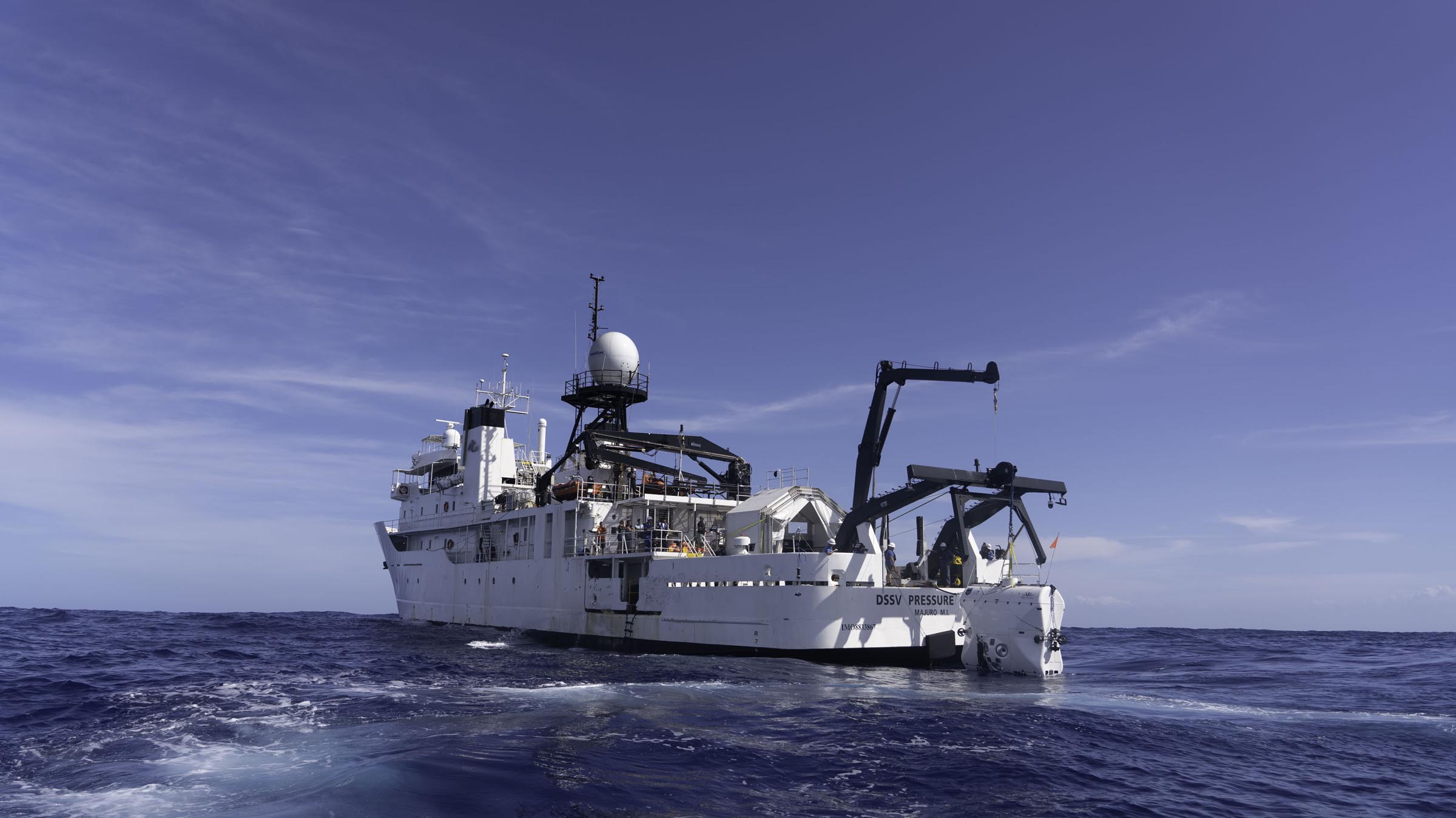
Limiting Factor being prepared for a dive into the Atlantic Ocean

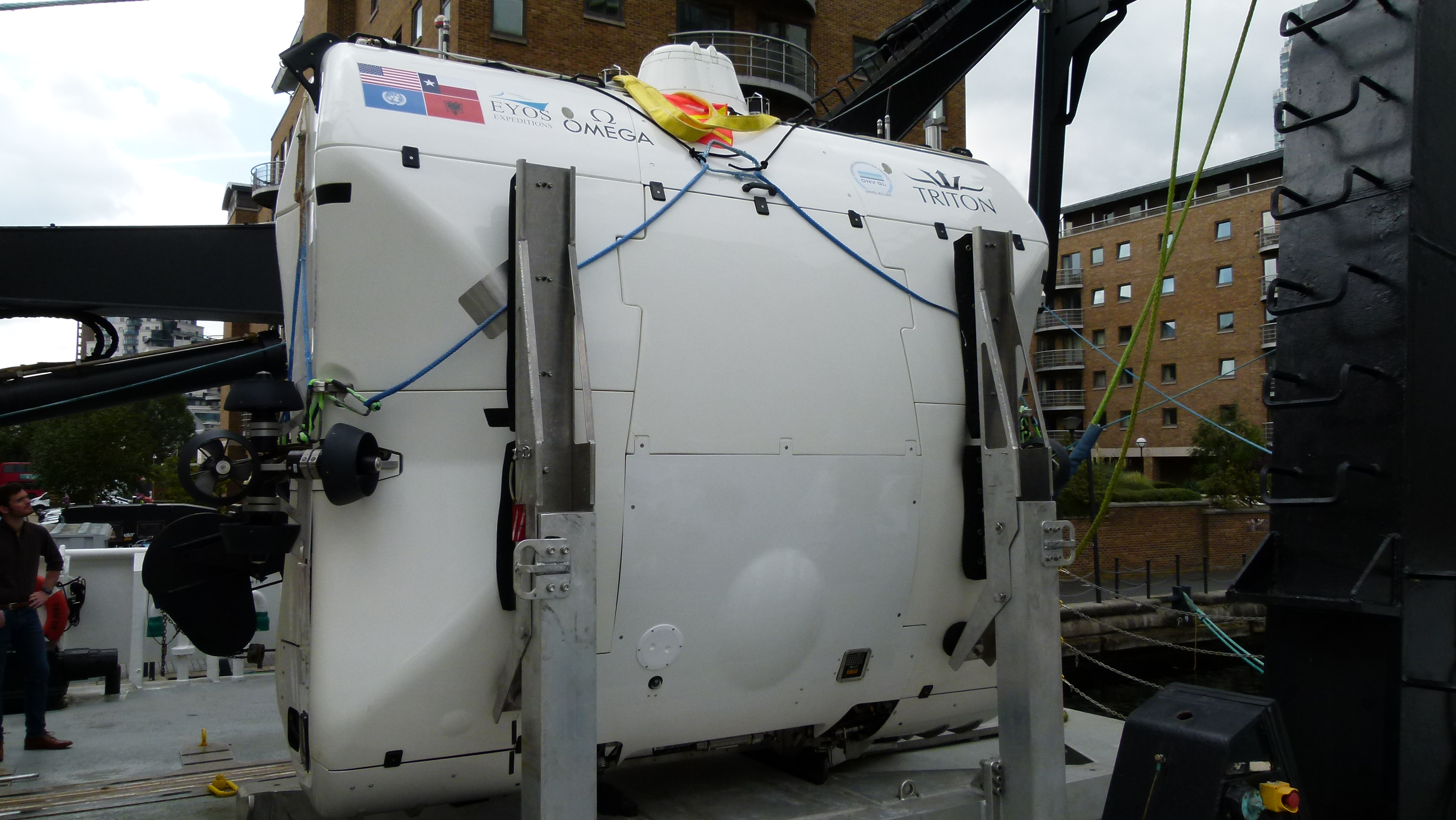
Rear view of Limiting Factor stowed in its cradle on deck

== See also ==
- Challenger expedition – Oceanographic research expedition (1872–1876)
- Deep-sea exploration – Investigation of ocean conditions beyond the continental shelf
- Submersible – Small watercraft able to navigate under water
  - Deep-submergence vehicle – Self-propelled deep-diving crewed submersible
    - Trieste (bathyscaphe) – Deep-sea scientific submersible
    - Deepsea Challenger – Submersible that traveled to the Challenger Deep
- Timeline of diving technology – Chronological list of notable events in the history of underwater diving equipment
