= Victor Vescovo =

American undersea explorer (born 1966)

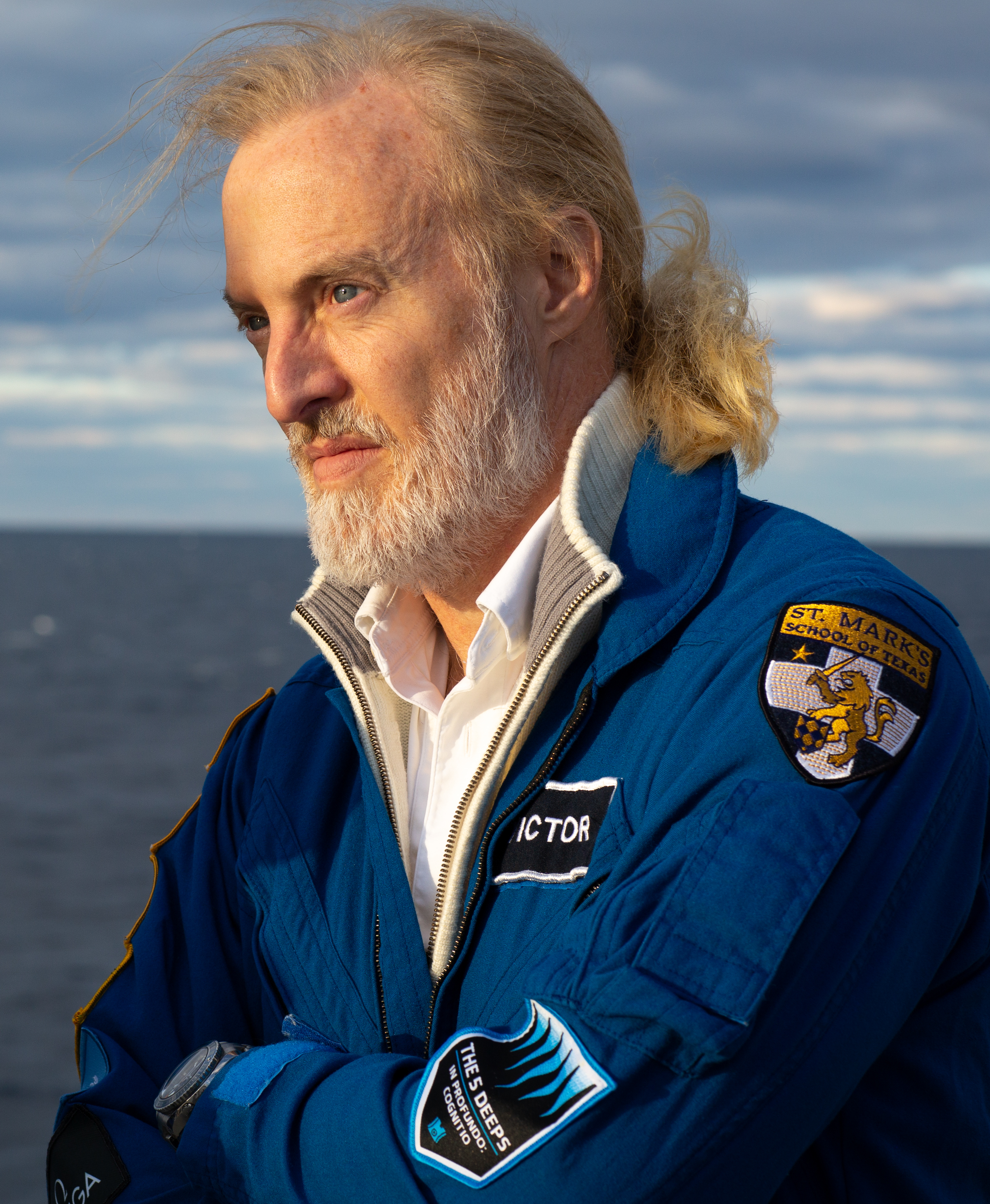
- Vescovo at sea, 2020
- Born: February 10, 1966 (age 60); Dallas, Texas, US
- Education: Stanford University; Massachusetts Institute of Technology; Harvard Business School
- Occupations: Private equity investor, former naval officer, mountain climber, undersea explorer
- Title: Co-Founder, Insight Equity Holdings; Commander, US Navy (Ret.)
- Awards: The Explorer Medal (2020), Captain Don Walsh Award for Ocean Exploration (2021), The Historical Diving Society USA – Hans Hass Award (2023), Ocean Elders
- Military career
- Allegiance: United States
- Branch: United States Navy
- Service years: 1993–2013
- Rank: Commander
- Space career

Blue Origin Space Tourist
- Flight time: 10 minutes, 5 seconds
- Missions: Blue Origin NS-21

Victor Lance Vescovo (born February 10, 1966) is an American private equity investor, retired naval officer, sub-orbital spaceflight participant, and undersea explorer. Vescovo achieved the Explorers Grand Slam by reaching the North and South Poles and climbing the Seven Summits. During the Five Deeps Expedition of 2018–2019 he became the first person to have visited the deepest points of all of Earth's five oceans.

== Early life ==
Vescovo grew up in Dallas, Texas, where he graduated from St. Mark's School of Texas. He earned a bachelor's degree in Economics and Political Science from Stanford University, a master's degree in Defense and Arms Control Studies (Political Science) from the Massachusetts Institute of Technology, and an MBA from Harvard Business School where he was a Baker scholar.

== Military service ==
Vescovo served 20 years in the U.S. Navy Reserve as an intelligence officer, retiring in 2013 as a Commander (O-5). On January 10, 2025, Secretary of the Navy Carlos Del Toro announced the second ship of the Explorer class of ocean surveillance ships will be named the USNS Victor Vescovo (T-AGOS 26) after Vescovo. Victoria Vescovo Webster, Vescovo's sister, was named ship sponsor.

== Investment career ==
Vescovo co-founded and was managing partner of private equity company Insight Equity Holdings from 2000 to 2023. He subsequently founded and is currently CEO of Caladan Capital, a venture capital firm focused on aerospace, defense, and life sciences investing.

== Five Deeps Expedition ==
In 2018, Vescovo launched the Five Deeps Expedition, whose objective was to dive to the deepest location in all five of the world's oceans by the end of September 2019. This expedition was filmed in the documentary television series Expedition Deep Ocean. This objective was achieved one month ahead of schedule, and the expedition's team carried out biological samplings and depth confirmations at each location. Besides the deepest points of the five world oceans, the expedition also made dives in the Horizon Deep and the Sirena Deep, and mapped the Diamantina fracture zone.

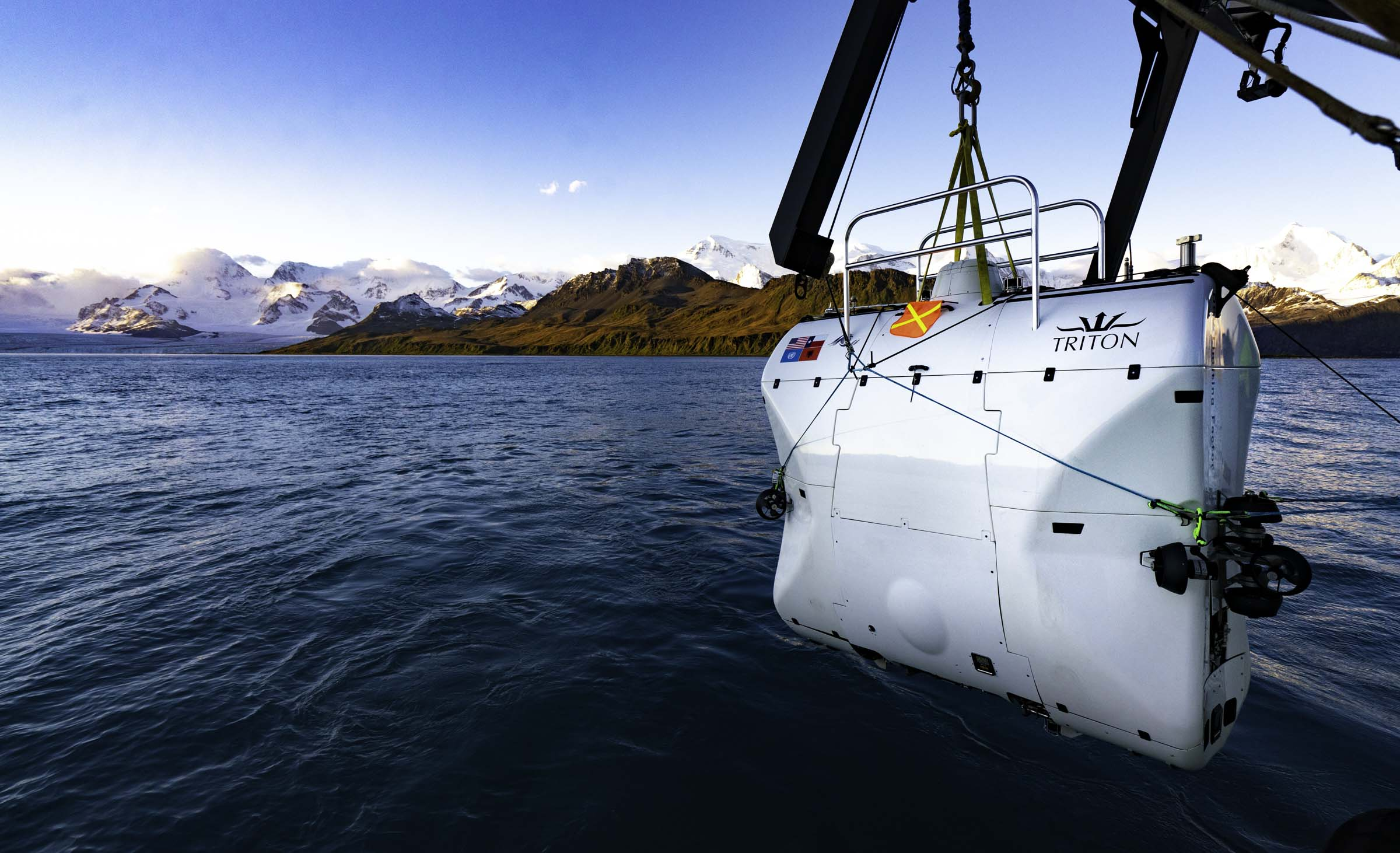
DSV Limiting Factor of Triton Submarines during sea trials

In December 2018, he became the first person to reach the deepest point of the Atlantic Ocean, piloting DSV Limiting Factor, a reported US$50 million submarine system (Triton 36000/2) – including its support ship the DSSV Pressure Drop and its three ultra-deep-sea robotic landers – 8,376 m (27,480 ft) below the ocean surface to the base of the Puerto Rico Trench, an area subsequently referred to by world media as Brownson Deep.

On February 4, 2019, he became the first person to reach the bottom of the Southern Ocean, in the southern portion of the South Sandwich Trench. For this attempt, the expedition used a Kongsberg EM124 multibeam sonar system to achieve accurate mapping of the trench.

On April 16, 2019, Vescovo dived to the bottom of the Sunda Trench south of Bali, reaching the bottom of the Indian Ocean. Likewise, this was done aboard the Limiting Factor. The team reported sightings of what they believed to be species new to science, including a hadal snailfish and a gelatinous organism believed to be a stalked ascidean. The same dive was later undertaken by Patrick Lahey, President of Triton Submarines, and the expedition's chief scientist, Dr. Alan Jamieson. This dive was organised subsequent to the scanning of the Diamantina fracture zone using multibeam sonar, confirming that the Sunda Trench was deeper and settling the debate about where the deepest point in the Indian Ocean is.

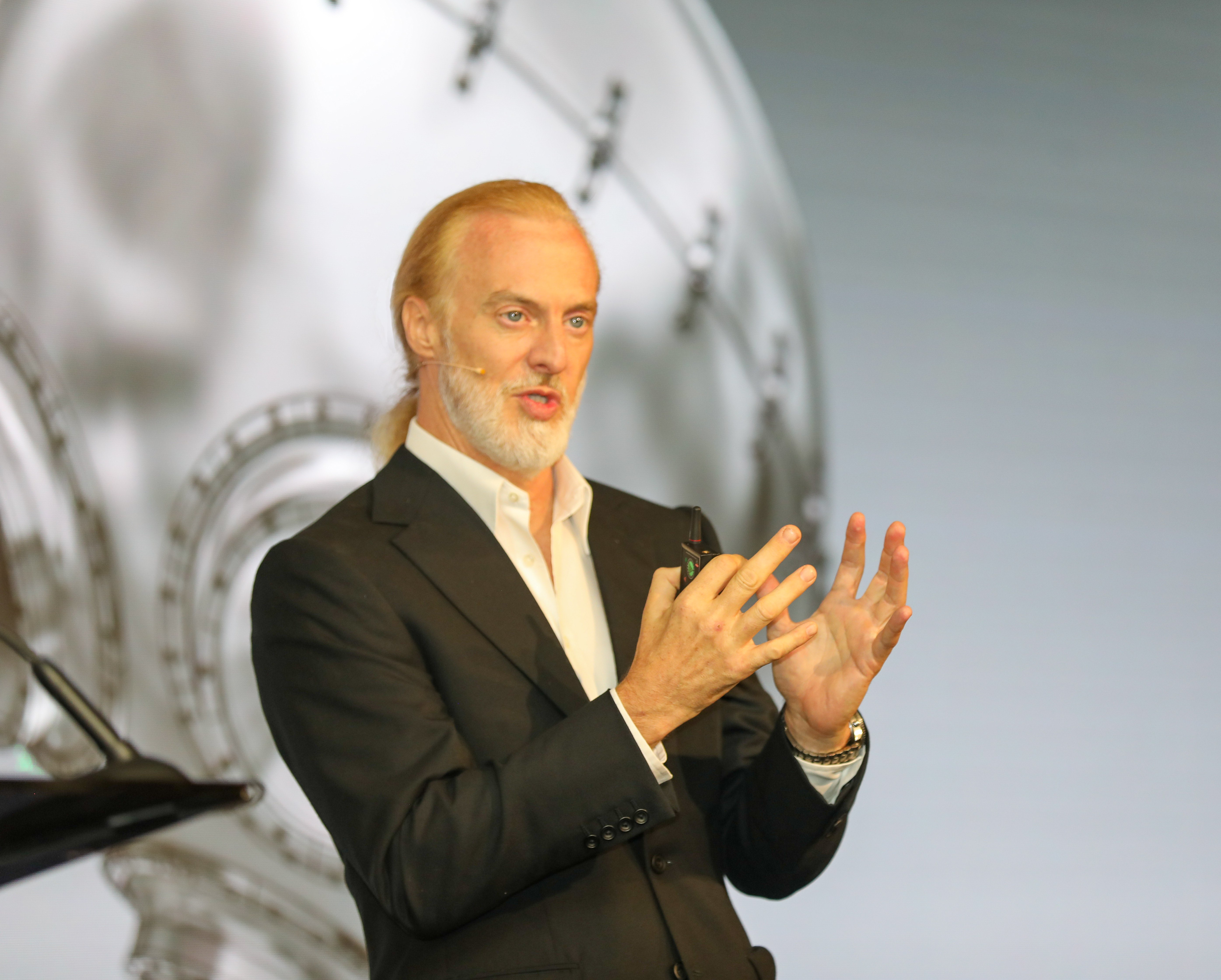
Vescovo in 2019

On April 28, 2019, Vescovo descended nearly 11 km (6.8 mi) to the deepest place in the ocean – the Challenger Deep in the Pacific Ocean's Mariana Trench. On his first descent, he piloted the DSV Limiting Factor to a depth of 10,928 m (35,853 ft), a world record by 16 m (52 ft). Diving for a second time on May 1, he became the first person to dive the Challenger Deep twice, finding "at least three new species of marine animals" and "some sort of plastic waste". Among the underwater creatures Vescovo encountered were a snailfish at 26,250 ft (8,000 m) and a spoon worm at nearly 23,000 ft (7,000 m), the deepest level at which the species had ever been encountered. On May 7, 2019, Vescovo and Jamieson made the first human-occupied deep submersible dive to the bottom of the Sirena Deep, the third deepest point in the ocean lying about 128 miles northeast from Challenger Deep. The time they spent there was 176 minutes; among the samples they retrieved was a piece of mantle rock from the western slope of the Mariana Trench.

On June 10, 2019, Vescovo reached the bottom of the Horizon Deep in the Tonga Trench, confirming that it is the second deepest point on the planet and the deepest in the Southern Hemisphere at 10,823 m (35,509 ft). In doing so, Vescovo had descended to the first, second, and third deepest points in the ocean. Unlike the Sunda and Mariana Trenches, no signs of human contamination were found in the deep, which was described by the expedition as "completely pristine".

Vescovo completed the Five Deeps Expedition on 24 August 2019 when he reached a depth of 5,550 m (18,210 ft) at the bottom of the Molloy Deep in the Arctic Ocean. He was the first human to reach this location.

== Maritime history exploration ==
In 2019, Vescovo escorted Titanic-historian Parks Stephenson to the wreck of the RMS Titanic for the first revisit of the wreck in 15 years. Findings included continued extensive corrosion and bacterial growth on iron and steel surfaces.

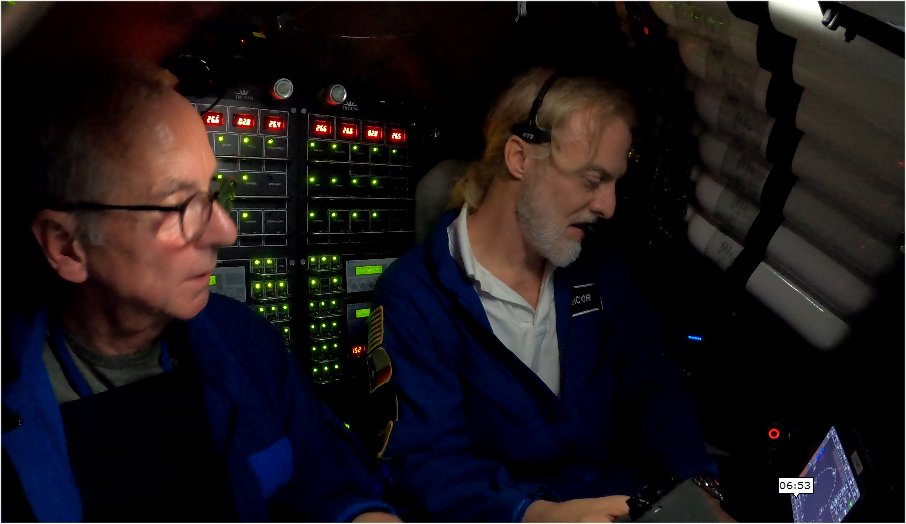
Vescovo piloting his submersible during the first of two dives to the wreck of the French submarine Minerve

In February 2020, Vescovo piloted his deep diving submersible twice to the wreck of the French submarine Minerve in the Mediterranean Sea. The retired French Rear Admiral Jean-Louis Barbier investigated the wreck of the Minerve on the first dive. On the second dive, Vescovo was accompanied by Hervé Fauve, the son of the captain of the sunken submarine. They placed a commemorative plaque at the wreck.

In 2021, Vescovo identified and surveyed the wreck of the USS Johnston (DD-557) at a depth of 6,456 metres (21,181 ft) in the Philippine Sea; at the time of identification this was the deepest shipwreck ever surveyed. The Johnston was sunk during the Battle off Samar (1944) in one of the most lopsided naval battles in history.

In 2022 a submersible expedition piloted by Vescovo located the wreck of destroyer escort USS Samuel B. Roberts (DE-413) (also sunk in the Battle off Samar in 1944), in the Philippine Sea at a depth of 6,895 metres (22,621 ft), making it the deepest wreck identified at this date.

In June 2023, Vescovo lost his friend Hamish Harding, whom he had been to space and sea with, when Harding died while trying to view the wreck of the Titanic inside OceanGate's Titan submersible. On Twitter Vescovo stated: "This has been a difficult week for the submersible community. Deep ocean diving is very safe when industry standard certifications and procedures are followed. I will miss my good friends PH Nargeolet, who I worked with closely, and Hamish Harding, my friend in sea and space." Vescovo appeared in the 2024 ABC special Truth and Lies: Fatal Dive to the Titanic, which examined the Titan submersible implosion.

Vescovo received the 2025 Freedom of the Seas Award from the National Museum of the Surface Navy.

== World records ==
In 2019, Victor Vescovo was recognized by Guinness World Records as the person who has covered the greatest vertical distance without leaving Earth's surface. As part of achieving the Explorers Grand Slam, Vescovo climbed Mount Everest (8,848 metres (29,029 ft)) on 24 May 2010, Earth's highest point. Almost nine years later he dove to the bottom of the Challenger Deep in the Mariana Trench (−10,924 metres (−35,840 ft)), Earth's lowest point, in the deep submersible Limiting Factor on 29 April 2019, for a total vertical distance of 19,772 metres (64,869 ft).

Vescovo completed the Explorers Grand Slam by climbing the highest peak on each of the seven continents, and skied the Last Degree of Latitude at both the North and South Poles. Uniquely, with the successful completion of his Five Deeps Expedition, Vescovo has also dived the deepest point in each of the five world's oceans. He is the first human to have reached the bottom of the Puerto Rico Trench, the Sunda Trench, the Molloy Deep, the Sirena Deep, the Horizon Deep, and the deepest point of the Southern Ocean, which lies in the southern end of the South Sandwich Trench. He is also the first to have dived the Challenger Deep more than once, doing so fifteen times, as well as the first to have visited all four of the ocean's 10,000+ meter deepest points: the Challenger Deep/Mariana Trench, Horizon Deep/Tonga Trench, Scholl Deep/Kermadec Trench, and Galathea Deep/Philippine Trench.

In June 2020, Vescovo returned to the Challenger Deep, specially equipped to survey its three, well-defined basins, or "pools". Carrying three CTDs on his submersible Limiting Factor as well as one CTD and one depthometer on each of his three independent robotic "landers". Vescovo piloted six passengers to the bottom of the Challenger Deep. These included former astronaut and NOAA Administrator Kathryn Sullivan, the first woman to ultimate depth; Kelly Walsh, the son of Don Walsh (who with Jacques Piccard made the first dive into the Challenger Deep) to become the only father/son team to make this journey albeit 60 years apart; and Vanessa O'Brien, the first woman to both climb Mount Everest and also descend to the bottom of the seafloor (Vescovo was the first person). At the end of his 2022 dives, Vescovo had the unique record of fifteen total dives to Challenger Deep, including the record for the deepest dive in history on April 28, 2019.

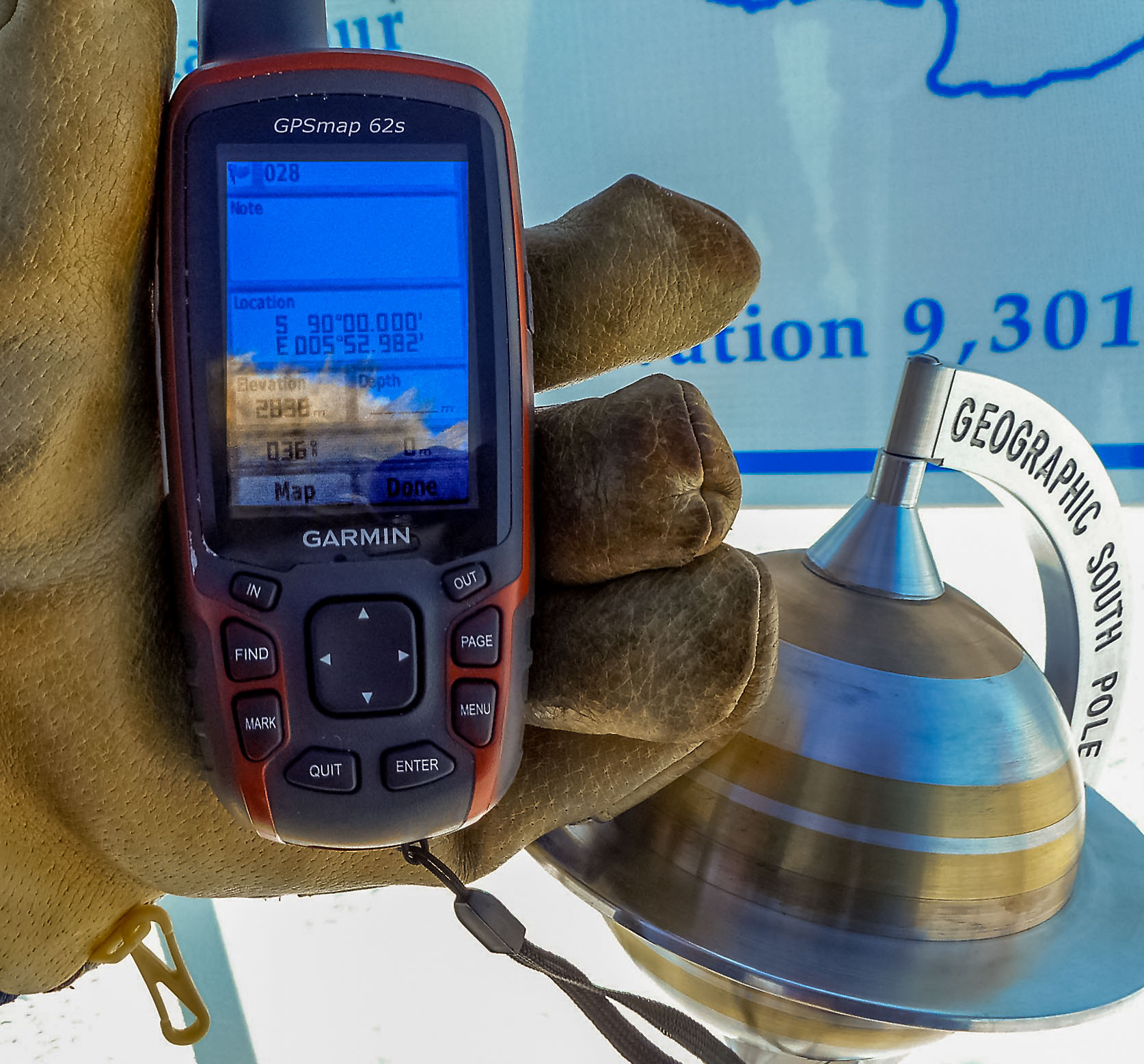
Garmin at 90 Deg South

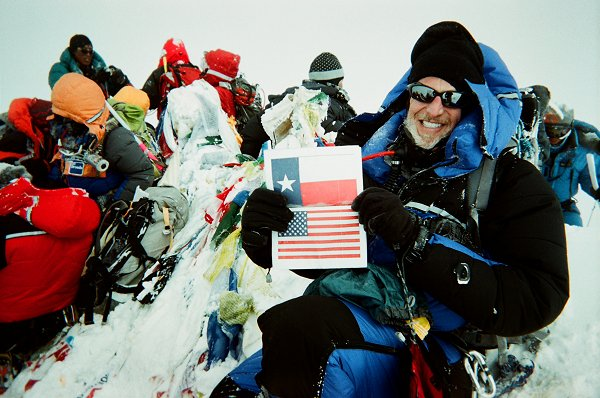
At Mount Everest summit with Texas Flag, 2010

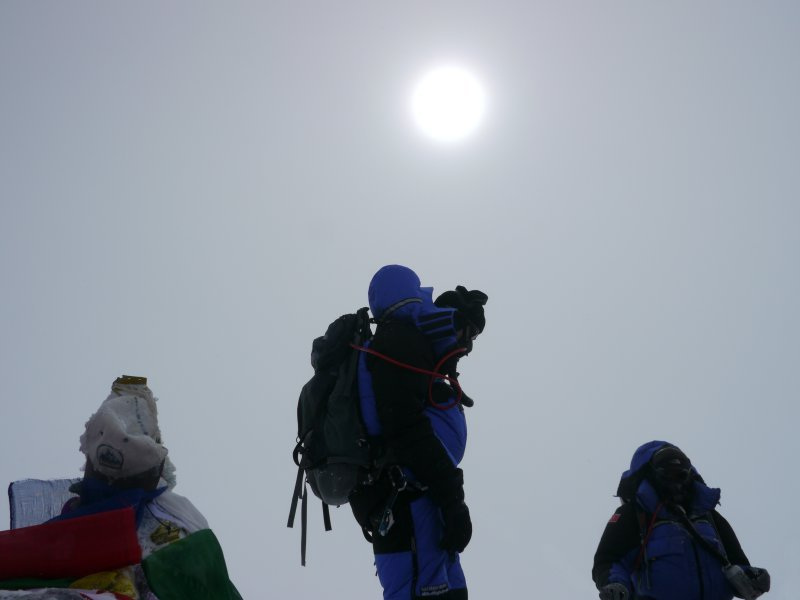
Vescovo with Kami Rita Sherpa (on right)

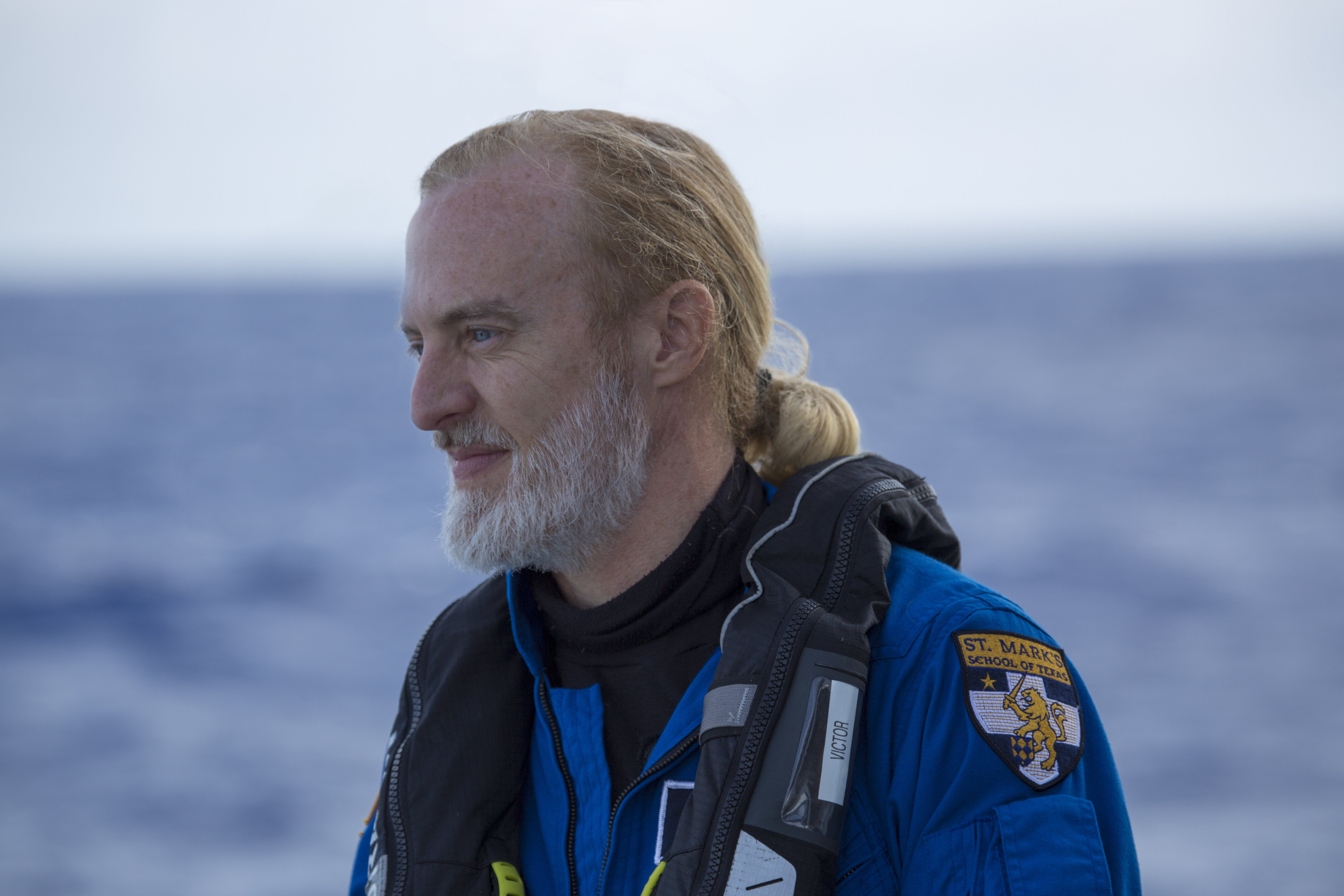
At Challenger Deep, 2019

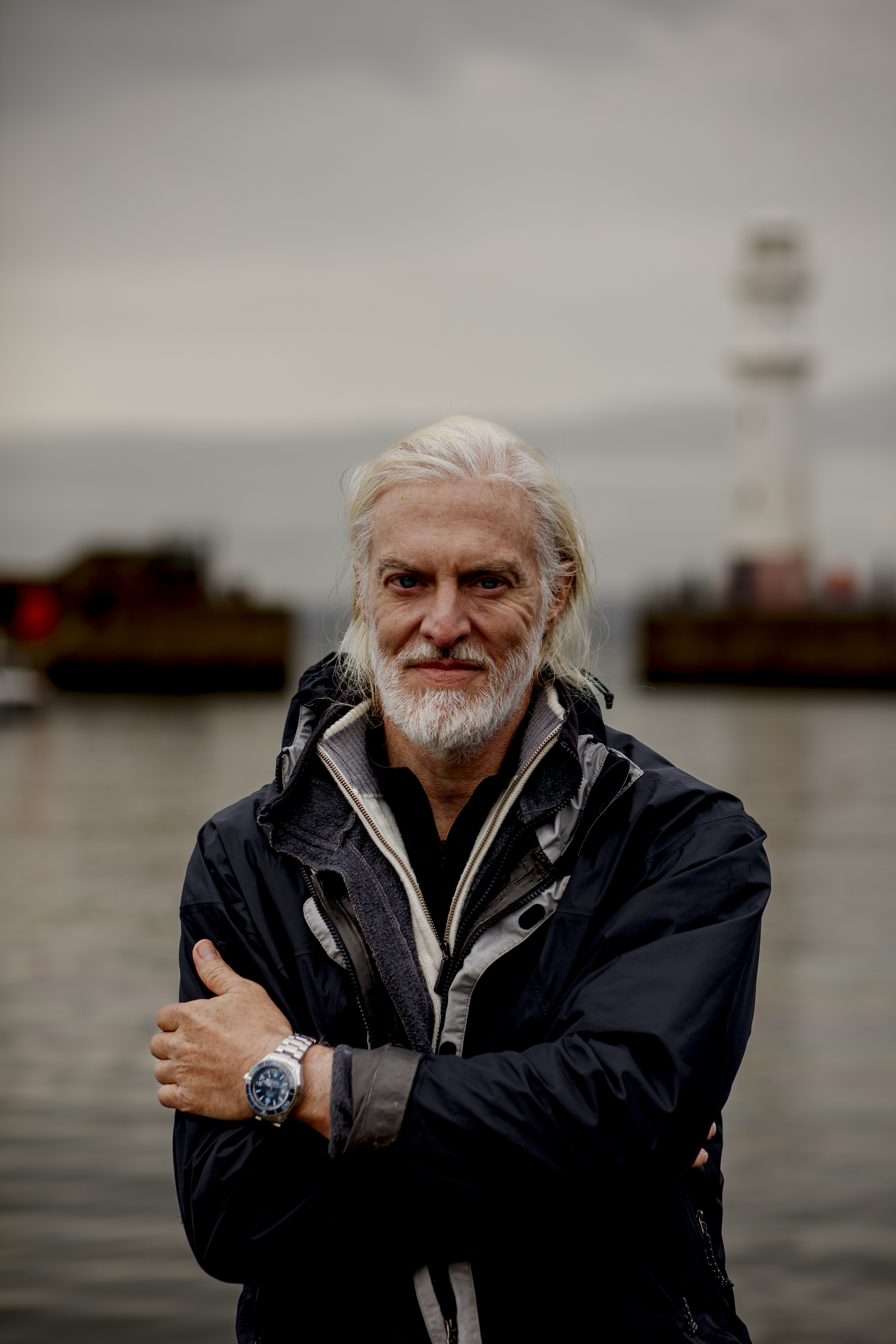
Vescovo in November 2023, Scotland

== Space flight ==
Vescovo flew to space onboard New Shepard, as part of the Blue Origin NS-21 mission in 2022. Forbes has recognized Vescovo as the "First To Climb Everest, Visit Ocean's Deepest Depth And Fly to the Final Frontier".

== Personal life ==
Victor has never been married or had children.

== See also ==
- Explorers Grand Slam
- Ocean Explorers Grand Slam
- List of people who descended to Challenger Deep
