= USNS Indomitable =

Stalwart-class ocean surveillance ship

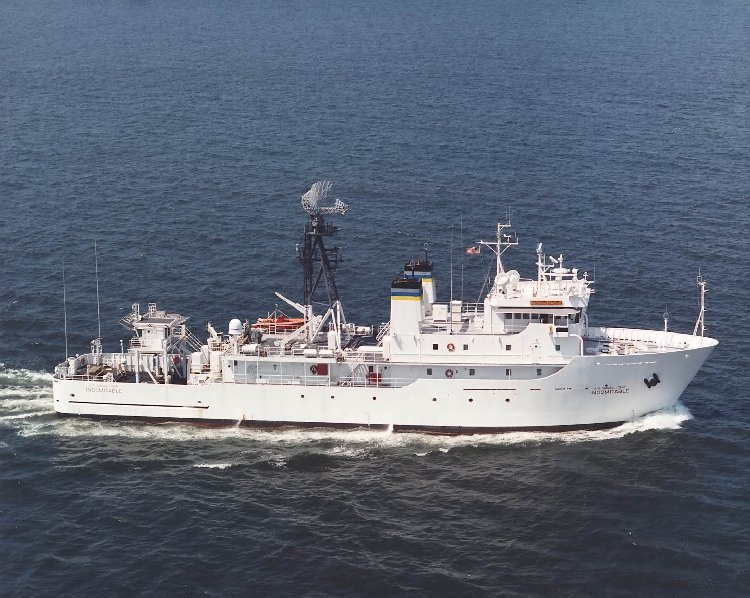
- USNS Indomitable

History

United States
- Name: USNS Indomitable
- Namesake: Indomitable: Incapable of being subdued, overcome, or vanquished
- Operator: Military Sealift Command
- Builder: Tacoma Boatbuilding Company, Tacoma, Washington
- Laid down: 26 January 1985
- Launched: 16 July 1985
- Acquired: 26 November 1985 (delivered to U.S. Navy)
- In service: 1 December 1985
- Out of service: 2 December 2002
- Stricken: 2 December 2002
- Identification: Hull number: T-AGOS-7
- Fate: Transferred to National Oceanic and Atmospheric Administration 9 December 2002

United States
- Name: NOAAS McArthur II
- Namesake: William Pope McArthur
- Acquired: 9 December 2002 (from U.S. Navy)
- Commissioned: 20 May 2003
- Decommissioned: 18 June 2014
- Home port: Seattle, Washington
- Identification: Hull number: R 330; IMO number: 8833867; MMSI number: 367843000; Callsign: WTEJ
- Nickname(s): "Big Mac"
- Status: Inactive in NOAA Pacific Fleet

General characteristics (as U.S. Navy ocean surveillance ship)
- Class & type: Stalwart-class ocean surveillance ship
- Displacement: 1,565 long tons (1,590 t) (light); 2,535 long tons (2,576 t) (full load)
- Length: 224 ft (68 m)
- Beam: 43 ft (13 m)
- Draft: 15 ft (4.6 m)
- Installed power: 1,600 hp (1,200 kW)
- Propulsion: Diesel-electric: Two General Electric 800 hp (600 kW) diesel engines, two shafts
- Speed: 11 knots (20 km/h; 13 mph)
- Complement: 33 (15 U.S. Navy personnel, 18 civilians)

General characteristics (as NOAA research ship)
- Type: ex-U.S. Navy Stalwart-class oceanographic research ship
- Tonnage: 1,486 GT; 786 DWT
- Displacement: 1,650 long tons (1,680 t) (light); 2,301 long tons (2,338 t) (full load)
- Length: 224 ft (68 m)
- Beam: 43 ft (13 m)
- Draft: 15 ft (4.6 m)
- Installed power: Two General Electric diesel engines (2 × 800 hp (600 kW))
- Propulsion: Diesel-electric; two shafts; Fixed pitch propellers; 550 hp (410 kW) General Electric Harbor Master bow thruster
- Speed: 10.5 to 11 knots (19.4 to 20.4 km/h; 12.1 to 12.7 mph) (sustained)
- Range: 8,000 nmi (15,000 km; 9,200 mi)
- Endurance: 30 or 45 days
- Boats & landing craft carried: One 24 ft (7.3 m) Zodiac rigid-hulled inflatable boat (RHIB); one 21 ft (6.4 m) Zodiac RHIB
- Complement: Either 22 (5 officers, 4 licensed engineers, and 13 other crew) or 24 (4 officers, 3 licensed engineers, and 17 other crew) plus up to either 15 scientists on domestic voyages or up to 14 scientists plus a Public Health Service during international voyages; or 21 (5 officers, 3 licensed engineers, and 13 other crew, plus 10 to 15 scientists
- Sensors & processing systems: One Furuno X-band radar, one Furuno S-band radar, both for navigation and collision avoidance; two depth sounders; a Furino Automated Identification System; several Global Positioning System receivers; Sperry MK227 gyrocompass
- Notes: 600 kilowatts electrical power; 250-kilowatt emergency generator

USNS Indomitable (T-AGOS-7) was a United States Navy Stalwart-class ocean surveillance ship in service from 1985 to 2002. From 2003 until 18 June 2014, she was in commission in the National Oceanic and Atmospheric Administration (NOAA) as the oceanographic research ship NOAAS McArthur II (R 330). As of 2018 it serves as a mother ship now named the Deep Submersible Support Vessel (DSSV) Pressure Drop for the crewed deep-ocean research submersible DSV Limiting Factor. In 2023, the ship was acquired by Inkfish, a marine research organization founded by Gabe Newell, and renamed RV Dagon.

== Construction ==
Indomitable was laid down by the Tacoma Boatbuilding Company at Tacoma, Washington on 26 January 1985 and launched on 16 July 1985. She was delivered to the U.S. Navy on 26 November 1985 and placed in non-commissioned service in the U.S. Navy's Military Sealift Command on 1 December 1985 as USNS Indomitable (T-AGOS-7), a United States Naval Ship with a mixed crew of U.S. Navy personnel and civilian merchant mariners.

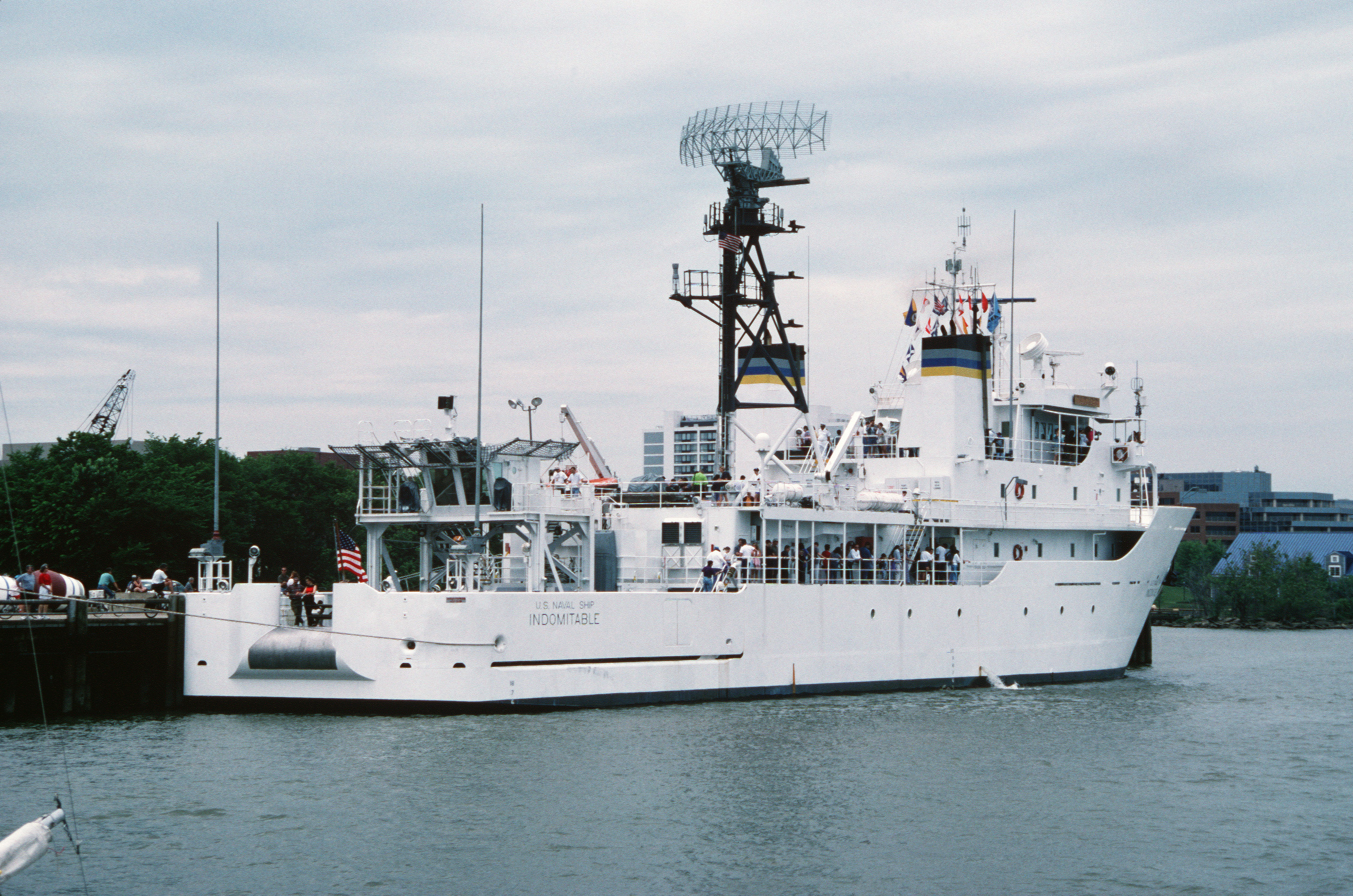
Indomitable in 1998 after removal of SURTASS and addition of AN/SPS-49 radar for counter-drug surveillance

== U.S. Navy service ==
Stalwart-class ships were designed to collect underwater acoustical data in support of Cold War anti-submarine warfare operations. Accordingly, Indomitable employed Surveillance Towed Array Sensor System (SURTASS) equipment on Cold War underwater surveillance duties during the final years of the Cold War.

After the Cold War ended with the collapse of the Soviet Union in late December 1991, requirements for such surveillance declined. In 1993, Indomitable's SURTASS gear was removed, and she received an AN/SPS-49 radar for use in counternarcotics surveillance. In her new role for counter narcotics patrol she deployed for two missions per year starting September 1993. As well as her civilian crew, she embarked 18 Navy personnel to operate her sensors and coordinate with authorities. For her first five missions she averaged 300 days underway per year operating in the Caribbean Sea and Panama Canal area.

Due to her extended at sea times, she operated a Civilian Ham Radio station from 1994 to 1995 for the crew to maintain contact with their families. Stateside operators freely cooperated making long-distance calls for the crew. The Navy retired Indomitable from service on 2 December 2002 and struck her from the Naval Vessel Register the same day.

== National Oceanic and Atmospheric Administration service ==
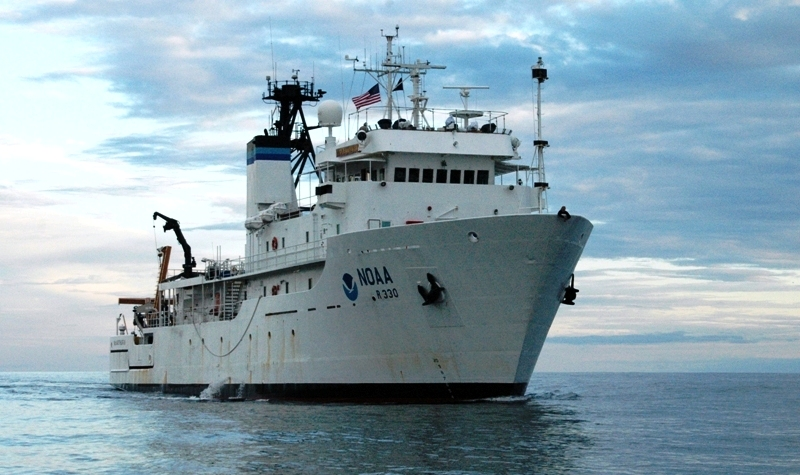
NOAAS McArthur II sometime between 2003 and 2009

On 9 December 2002, Indomitable was transferred to the National Oceanic and Atmospheric Administration (NOAA). NOAA converted her into an oceanographic research ship. She was commissioned in the NOAA fleet as NOAAS McArthur II (R 330) on 20 May 2003, replacing the NOAA survey ship NOAAS McArthur (S 330), which was decommissioned the same day in a combined ceremony.

=== Capabilities ===
McArthur II had berthing for 38 people in 18 single staterooms, eight double staterooms and one quadruple stateroom, which provided her with the capacity to carry up to 15 scientists on domestic voyages or up to 14 scientists and a United States Public Health Service officer on international voyages. Her crew's mess seated 16 people at a time.

McArthur II had a wet laboratory freezer, a dry laboratory freezer and an oceanographic laboratory refrigerator. On deck, she had a 2.3-ton-capacity deck crane with a boom extending to 46 feet (14 m), two oceanographic winches, a movable A-frame and a movable J-frame. She carried one 24-foot (7.3 m) and one 21-foot (6.4 m) Zodiac rigid-hulled inflatable boats (RHIB).

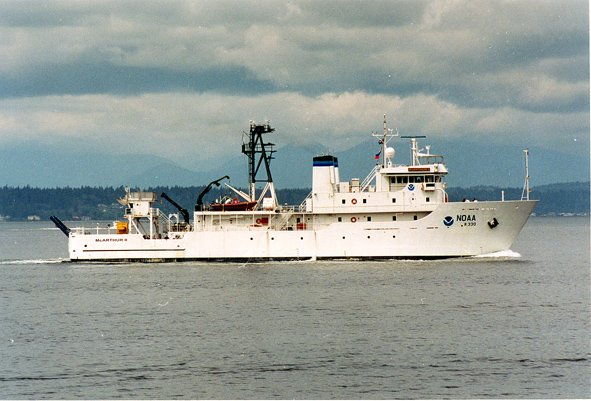
McArthur II underway sometime between 2003 and 2009.

=== Operations ===
McArthur II was an active member of the NOAA Pacific Fleet with her home port at Seattle, Washington. She departed Seattle on her maiden NOAA cruise on 1 June 2003. She conducted oceanographic research and assessments throughout the eastern Pacific Ocean, including along the United States West Coast - where she was involved in studies in several national marine sanctuaries - and the Pacific coast of Central America and South America. She engaged in measurements of chemical, meteorological, and biological sampling for several large-scale programs within NOAA, and the scientists who carry out research aboard her come from many divisions of NOAA, as well as other United States Government agencies, U.S. state government agencies, and academia.

McArthur II was retired by NOAA on 18 June 2014. She had been inactive since 2011.

== Caladan Oceanic LLC service ==
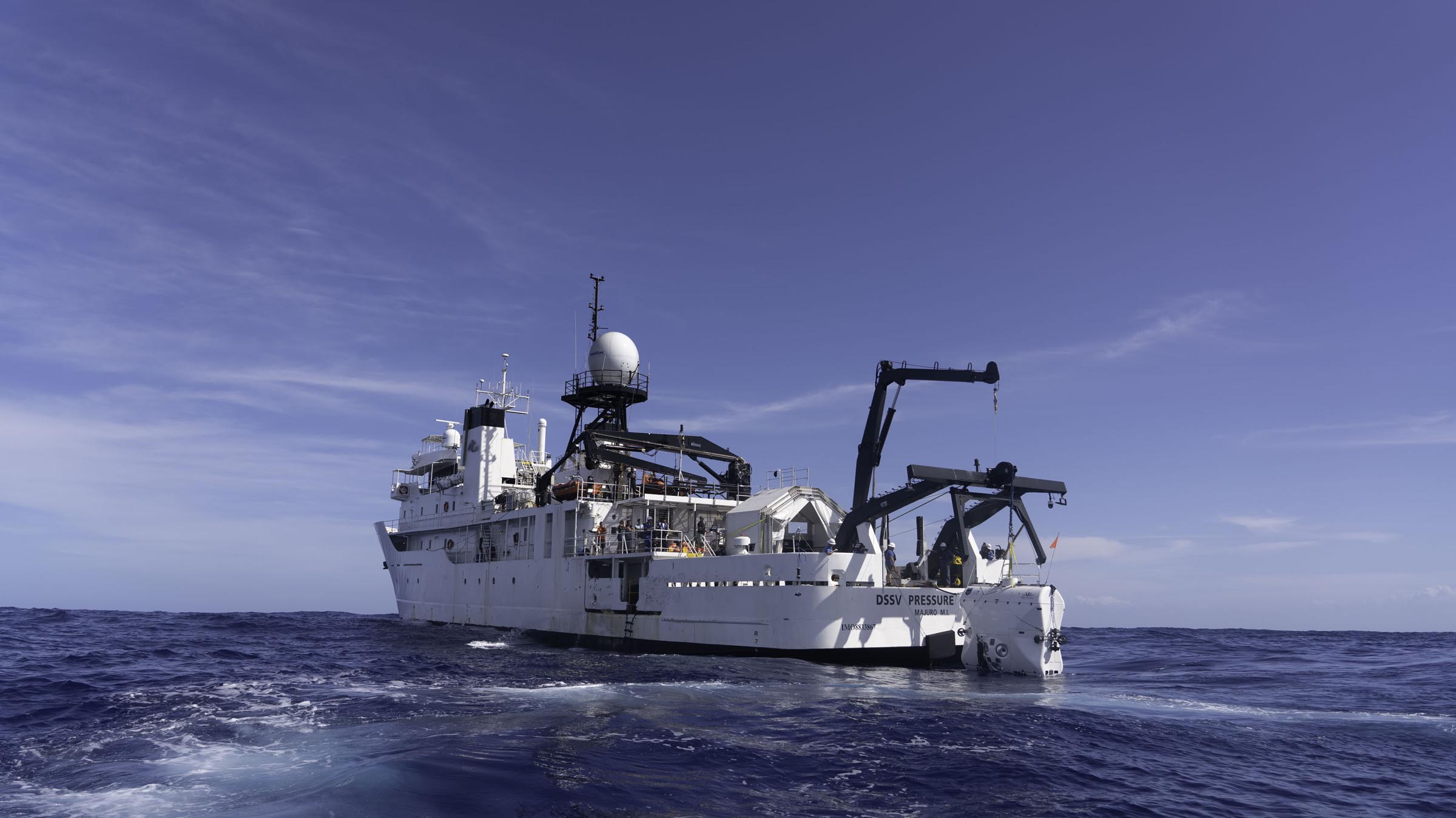
The mothership Pressure Drop during the preparation for a dive of the deep diving submersible Limiting Factor.

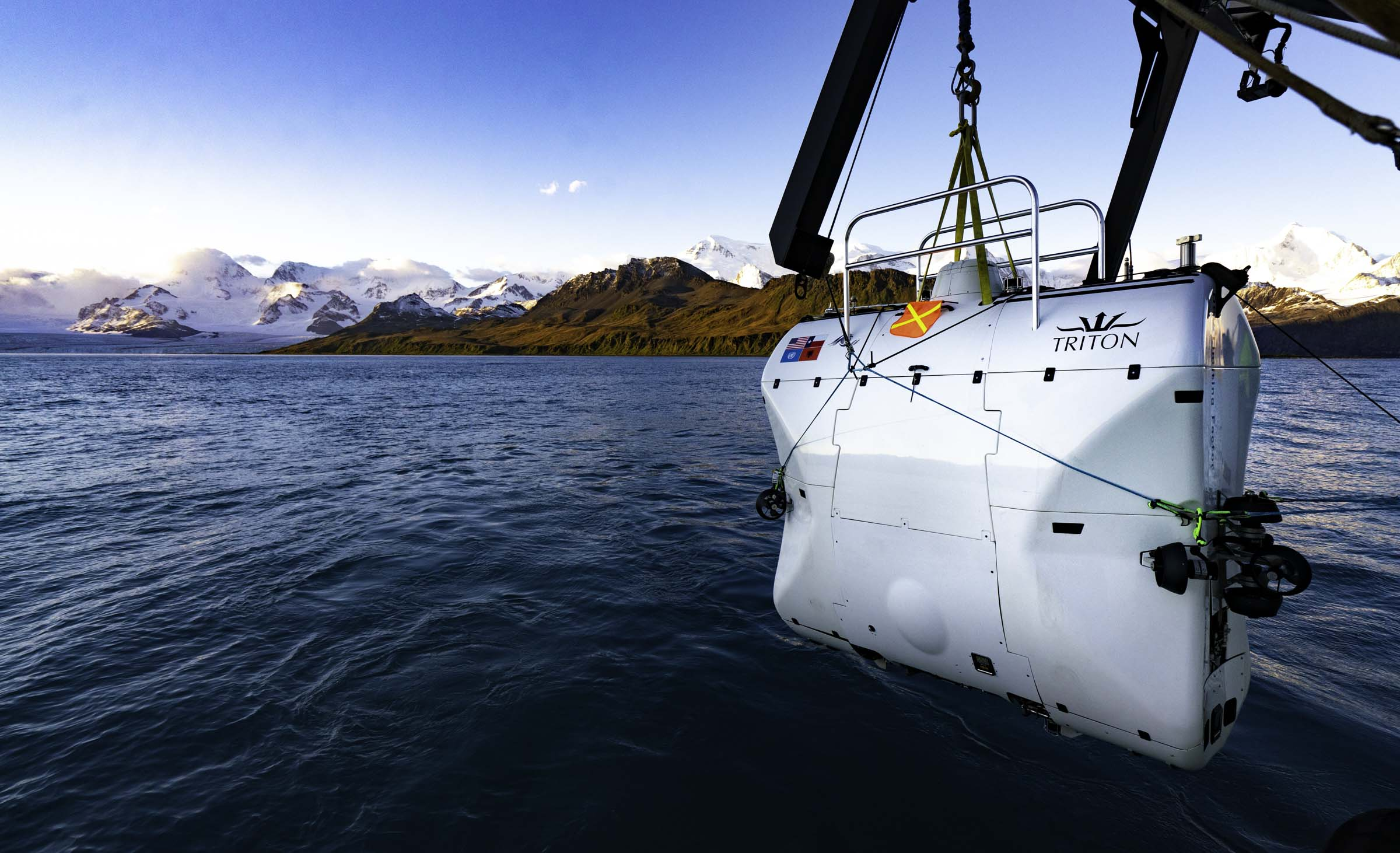
DSV Limiting Factor of Triton Submarines during sea trials

In 2017 the vessel was bought by Caladan Oceanic LLC and prepared to serve as a mother ship for the crewed deep-ocean research submersible DSV Limiting Factor. The vessel was named DSSV Pressure Drop because the financial sponsor Victor Vescovo admires the ship names found in the Culture novels written by Iain M. Banks.

Beginning in December 2018, the Pressure Drop began execution of the Five Deeps Expedition to support a crewed submersible visit to the bottom of all five of the world's oceans. On 19 December 2018, the first of the five oceans bottoms was visited: the bottom of the Atlantic at the Puerto Rico trench. In August 2019, the Pressure Drop completed the Five Deeps Expedition after the Limiting Factor submersible successfully made the first crewed descent to the bottom of the Arctic Ocean, the Molloy Deep.

In late December 2021, the DSV Limiting Factor piloted by Victor Vescovo was exploring the Philippine Trench when it caught video images of a creature at a depth of 6,212 meters (20,381 ft). The animal was later identified by University of Western Australia researcher Alan Jamieson and Smithsonian Institution zoologist Mike Vecchione as a magnapinnid, also known as a bigfin squid. This was the deepest sighting ever of a squid.

In February 2022, Pressure Drop and its submersible were offered for sale for $50 million. Vescovo announced that he sold the whole Hadal Exploration System including the DSSV Pressure Drop to Gabe Newell's Inkfish Open Ocean Program.

== Service in the Inkfish Open Ocean Program ==
Since its purchase by Inkfish, the vessel was renamed to RV Dagon.
