= Molloy Deep =

Bathymetric feature in the Fram Strait

Coordinates: 79°8′12″N 2°49′0″E

- Interactive map of Molloy Deep
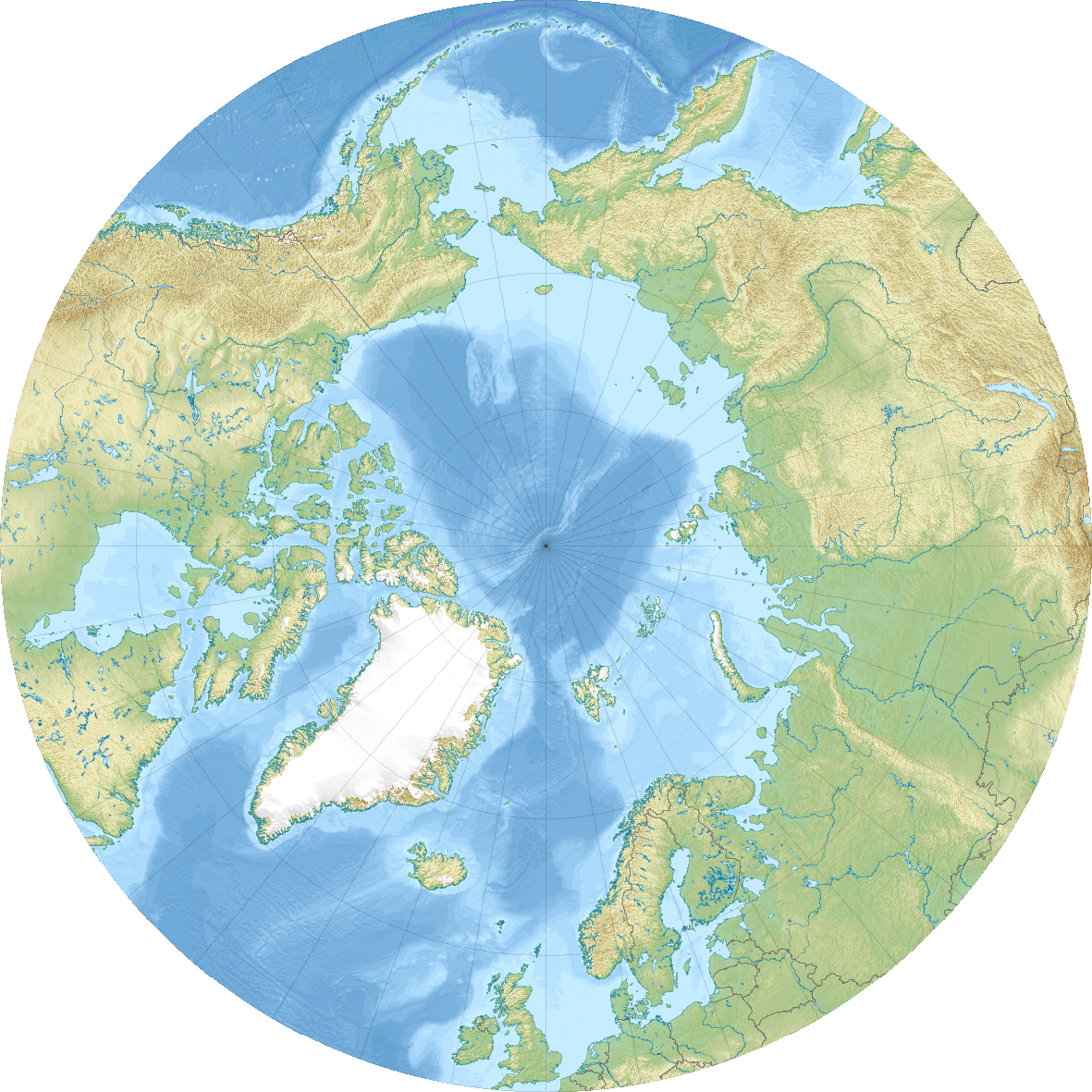
- Location: Location of Molloy Deep
- Type: Oceanic trench
- Etymology: Arthur E. Molloy
- Part of: Fram Strait
- Max. depth: 5,550 m (18,210 ft)
- Water volume: 600 km^{3} (140 cu mi)

The Molloy Deep (also known as the Molloy Hole) is a bathymetric feature in the Fram Strait, within the Greenland Sea east of Greenland and about 160 km (100 mi) west of Svalbard. It is the location of the deepest point in the Arctic Ocean. The Molloy Deep, Molloy Hole, Molloy Fracture Zone, and Molloy Ridge were named after Arthur E. Molloy, a U.S. Navy research scientist who worked in the North Atlantic, North Pacific, and Arctic Oceans in the 1950s–1970s.

The outer rim of the trench is at a depth of 2,700 m (8,900 ft) and contains about 600 km^{2} (230 sq mi) inside the rim, descending to approximately 5,550 m (18,210 ft) at its greatest depth. The basin floor measures about 220 km^{2} (85 sq mi) and is the deepest point in the Arctic Ocean. The only person to have reached the bottom of the Molloy Deep is American explorer Victor Vescovo as part of his Five Deeps Expedition.

== Topography ==
The Molloy Deep is a roughly rectangular, seismically active, extensional, sea-floor basin that lies between the northwestern tip of the Molloy Fracture Zone (a right-lateral, strike-slip fault) and the Spitsbergen Fracture Zone (also a right-lateral, strike-slip fault). These two fracture zones connect the actively spreading northern segment of the Mid-Atlantic Ocean ridge system called the Knipovich Ridge with the Lena Trough, an actively spreading mid-ocean ridge region north of the Spitsbergen Fracture Zone. The Lena Trough joins the southwestern end of the Arctic Ocean's Gakkel Ridge, which is the slowest-spreading mid-ocean ridge on Earth and which stretches across the entire Arctic Oceans' Eurasian Basin.

== Surveys ==
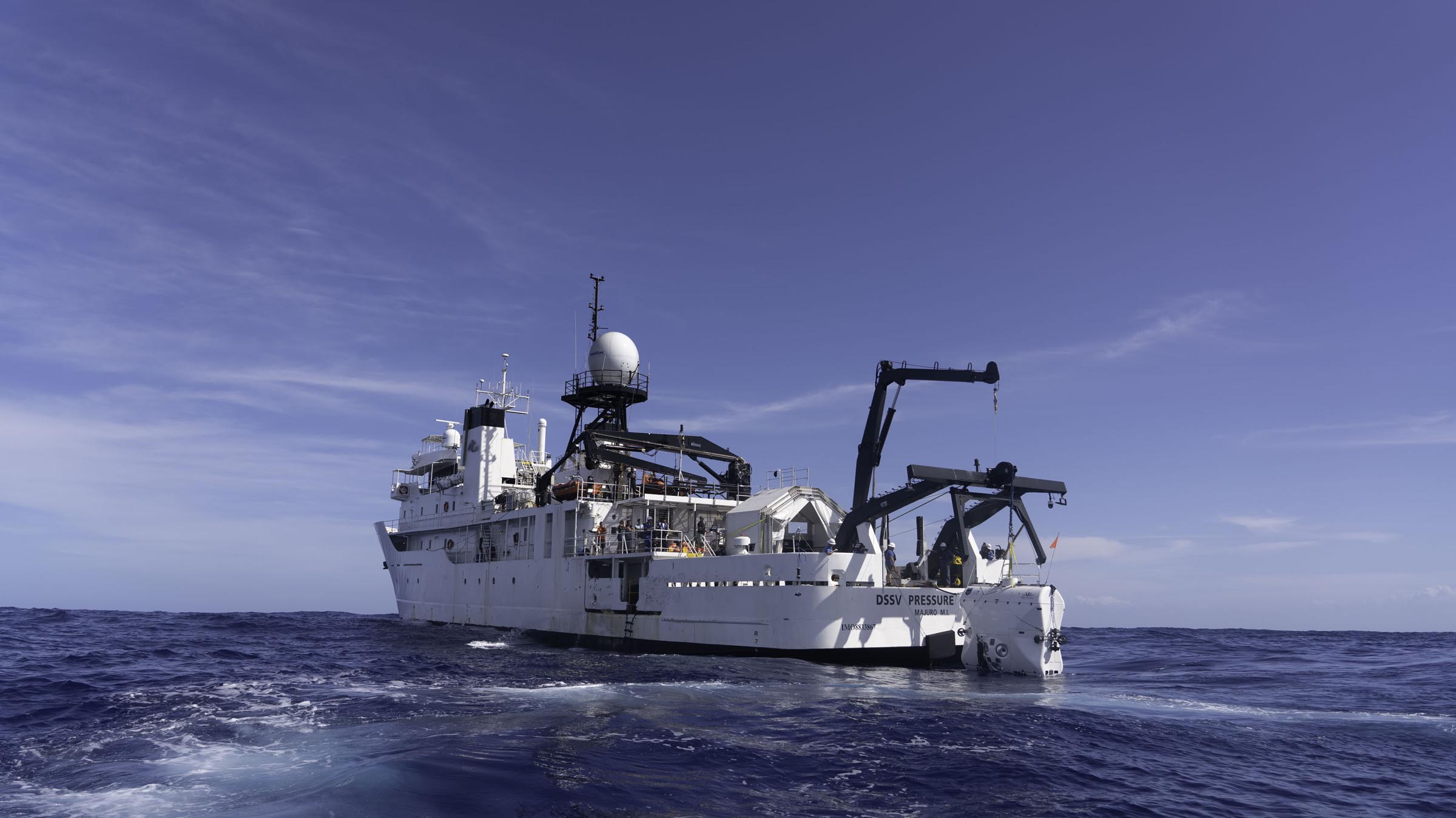
DSSV Pressure Drop and DSV Limiting Factor at its stern

The Molloy Deep was discovered in September 1973 by the USNS Hayes, the first of a new class of catamaran-hulled oceanographic research vessels. The Molloy Deep, Molloy Hole, Molloy Fracture Zone, and Molloy Ridge were named after Arthur E. Molloy, a U.S. Navy research scientist who worked in the North Atlantic, North Pacific and Arctic Oceans in the 1950s–1970s.

== Descents ==
The only person to reach the bottom of the Molloy Deep is Victor Vescovo on 24 August 2019. The Five Deeps Expedition leader and chief submersible pilot, Vescovo, descended into the Molloy Deep in the Deep-Submergence Vehicle Limiting Factor (a Triton 36000/2 model submersible) from the support ship, the Deep Submersible Support Vessel Pressure Drop. The Five Deeps Expedition established the depth of the Molloy Deep as 5,550 m (18,210 ft) ±14 m (46 ft) by direct CTD pressure measurements. This is shallower than previous estimations using earlier technology with less precise bathymetric methods.
