= Mariana Trench Marine National Monument =

US national monument in the Mariana Archipelago

- IUCN category V (protected landscape/seascape)
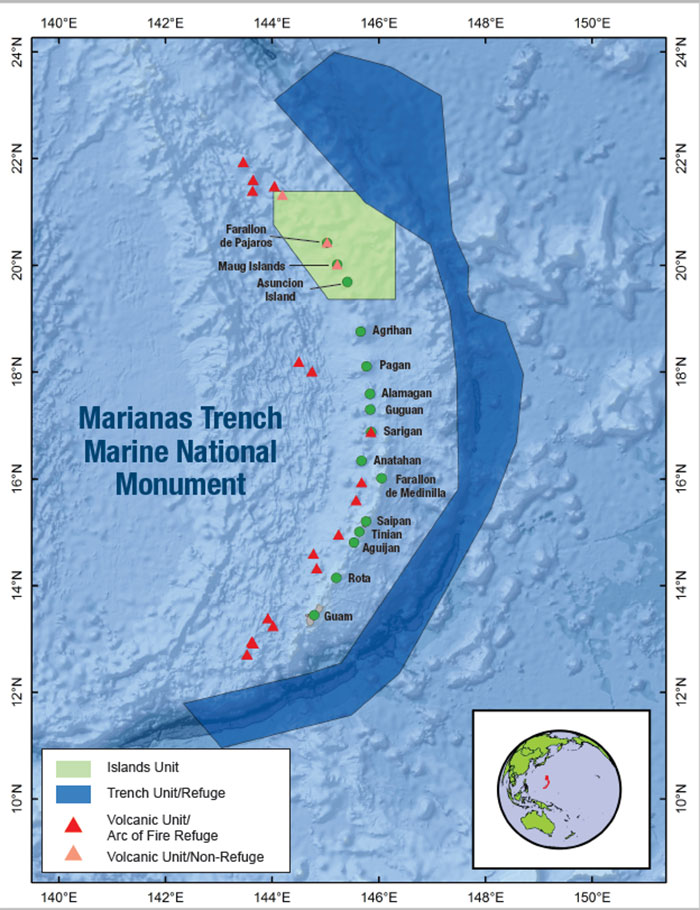
- Mariana Trench Marine National Monument

- Location within Pacific Ocean Location within Northern Mariana Islands
- Location: Mariana Archipelago, Commonwealth of the Northern Mariana Islands and Guam
- Nearest city: Capitol Hill, Saipan, Northern Mariana Islands
- Coordinates: 18°N 148°E
- Area: 95,216 sq mi (246,610 km^{2})
- Designation: National monument
- Designated: January 5, 2009
- Named for: Mariana Trench
- Governing body: U.S. Fish and Wildlife Service
- Website: Mariana Trench Marine National Monument

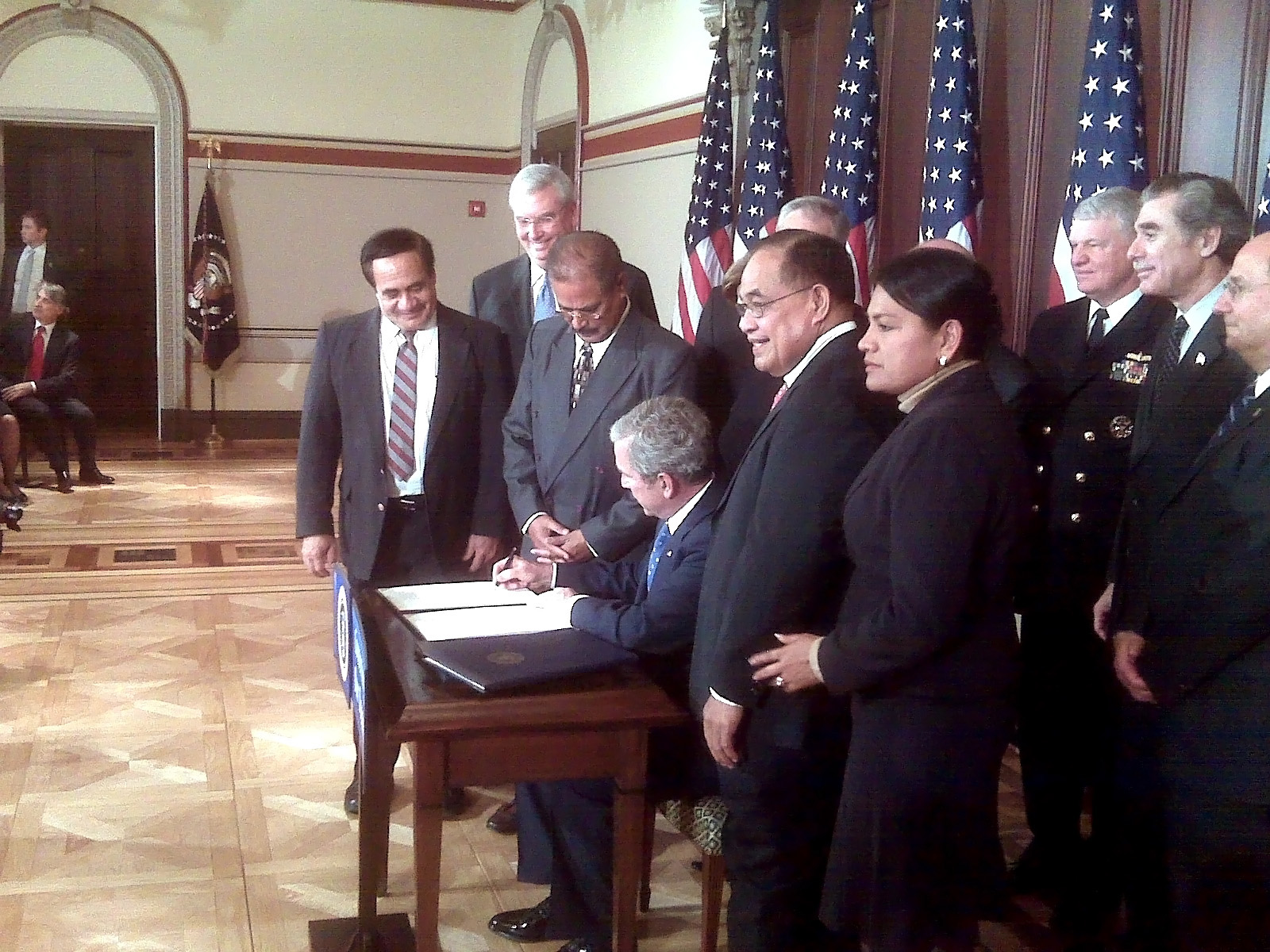
President George W. Bush signs paperwork establishing the Mariana Trench Marine National Monument on January 6, 2009

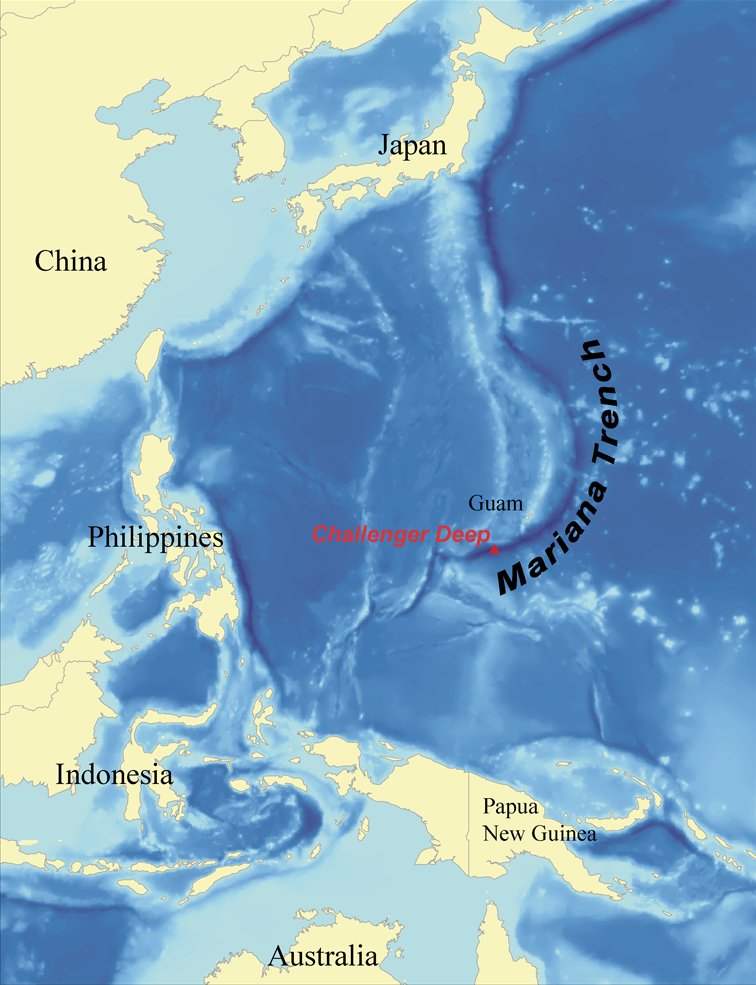
Mariana Trench Map

The Mariana Trench Marine National Monument is a United States National Monument created by President George W. Bush by the presidential proclamation no. 8335 on January 6, 2009. The monument includes no dry land area, but protects 95,216 square miles (246,610 km^{2}) of submerged lands and waters in various places around the Mariana Archipelago, including part of the Mariana Trench and submerged volcanos.

== Scope ==
The Mariana Trench Marine National Monument consists of 95,216 square miles (60,938,240 acres). The monument consists of submerged lands and waters of the Mariana Archipelago. It includes three units:

- Islands Unit – the waters and submerged lands of the three northernmost Mariana Islands (Farallon de Pajaros or Uracas, Maug, and Asuncion)
- Volcanic Unit (Mariana Arc of Fire National Wildlife Refuge) – the submerged lands within 1 nautical mile of 21 designated volcanic sites
- Trench Unit (Mariana Trench National Wildlife Refuge) – the submerged lands extending from the northern limit of the Exclusive Economic Zone of the United States in the Commonwealth of the Northern Mariana Islands (CNMI) to the southern limit of the Exclusive Economic Zone of the United States in the Guam.

No waters are included in the Volcanic and Trench Units, and CNMI maintains all authority for managing the three islands within the Islands Unit above the mean low water line. The Interior Secretary placed the Mariana Trench and Volcanic Units within the National Wildlife Refuge System, and delegated his management responsibility to the Fish and Wildlife Service.

The Secretary of Commerce, through the National Oceanic and Atmospheric Administration, has primary management responsibility for fishery-related activities in the waters of the Islands Unit.

=== Islands Unit ===
In the Islands Unit, unique reef habitats support marine biological communities dependent on basalt rock foundations, unlike those throughout the remainder of the Pacific. These reefs and waters are among the most biologically diverse in the Western Pacific and include the greatest diversity of seamount and hydrothermal vent life yet discovered. They also contain one of the most diverse collections of stony corals in the Western Pacific, including more than 300 species, higher than any other U.S. reef area.

The submerged caldera at Maug is one of only a few known places in the world where photosynthetic and chemosynthetic communities of life coexist. The caldera is some 1.5 miles wide and 820 feet deep, an unusual depth for lagoons. The lava dome in the center of the crater rises to within 65 feet of the surface. Hydrothermal vents at about 475 feet in depth along the northeast side of the dome spew acidic water at scalding temperatures near the coral reef that quickly ascends to the sea surface. Thus, coral reefs and microbial mats are spared much of the impact of these plumes and are growing nearby, complete with thriving tropical fish. As ocean acidification increases across the Earth, this caldera offers scientists an opportunity to look into the future and ensure continuation of coral reef communities.

=== Mariana Arc of Fire National Wildlife Refuge (Volcanic Unit) ===
The Mariana Arc of Fire National Wildlife Refuge (Volcanic Unit) – an arc of 21 undersea mud volcanoes and thermal vents – supports unusual life forms in some of the harshest conditions imaginable. Here species survive in the midst of hydrothermal vents that produce highly acidic boiling water. Three of the volcanos are also within the Islands Unit.

- The Champagne hydrothermal vent, found at the Northwest Eifuku submarine volcano produces almost pure liquid carbon dioxide, one of only two known sites in the world.
- A pool of liquid sulfur at the Daikoku submarine volcano is unique.

=== Mariana Trench National Wildlife Refuge (Trench Unit) ===
The Challenger Deep, located just outside the Trench Unit, is the deepest point in the Earth's oceans, deeper than the height of Mount Everest above sea level. It is five times longer than the Grand Canyon and includes some 78,956 square miles (204,500 km^{2}) of virtually unexplored underwater terrain. The Sirena Deep, about 6.6 miles beneath the surface, is the deepest point of the Mariana Trench Marine National Monument.

== Name of monument ==
While the actual text of the proclamation establishing it gives it the official name Marianas Trench Marine National Monument, it also refers to the trench as the Mariana Trench. Both NOAA and FWS websites and the 2024 management plan call it Mariana Trench Marine National Monument to match the official spelling of the Mariana Trench, though older documents retain the plural spelling. Some news reports erroneously used the name Marianas Marine National Monument, omitting the word "Trench".

== See also ==
- List of national monuments of the United States
