= Project Nekton =

Series of test dives and deep-submergence operations in the Pacific Ocean

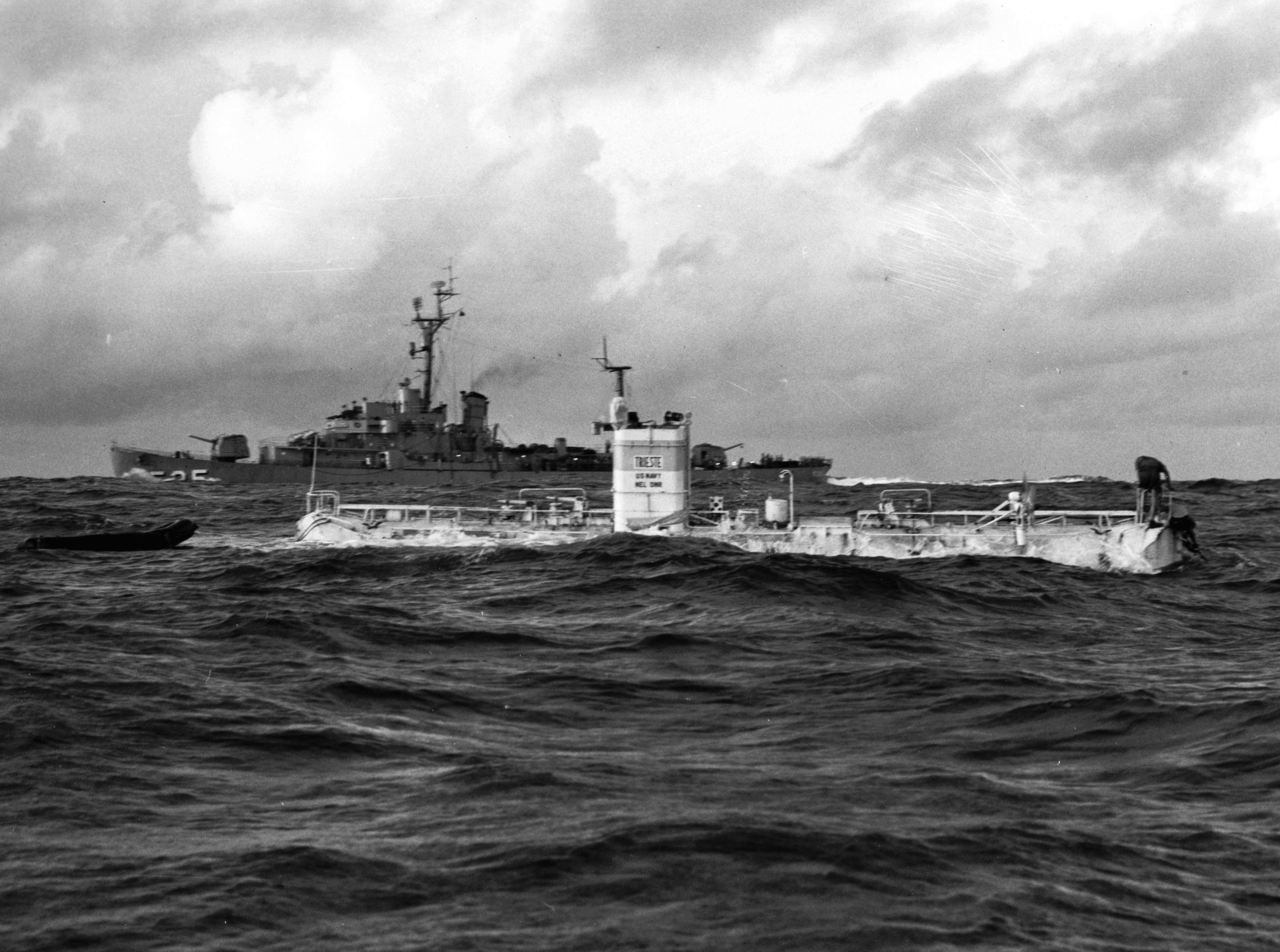
23 January 1960: the Bathyscaphe Trieste just before the record dive. Behind her is the USS Lewis

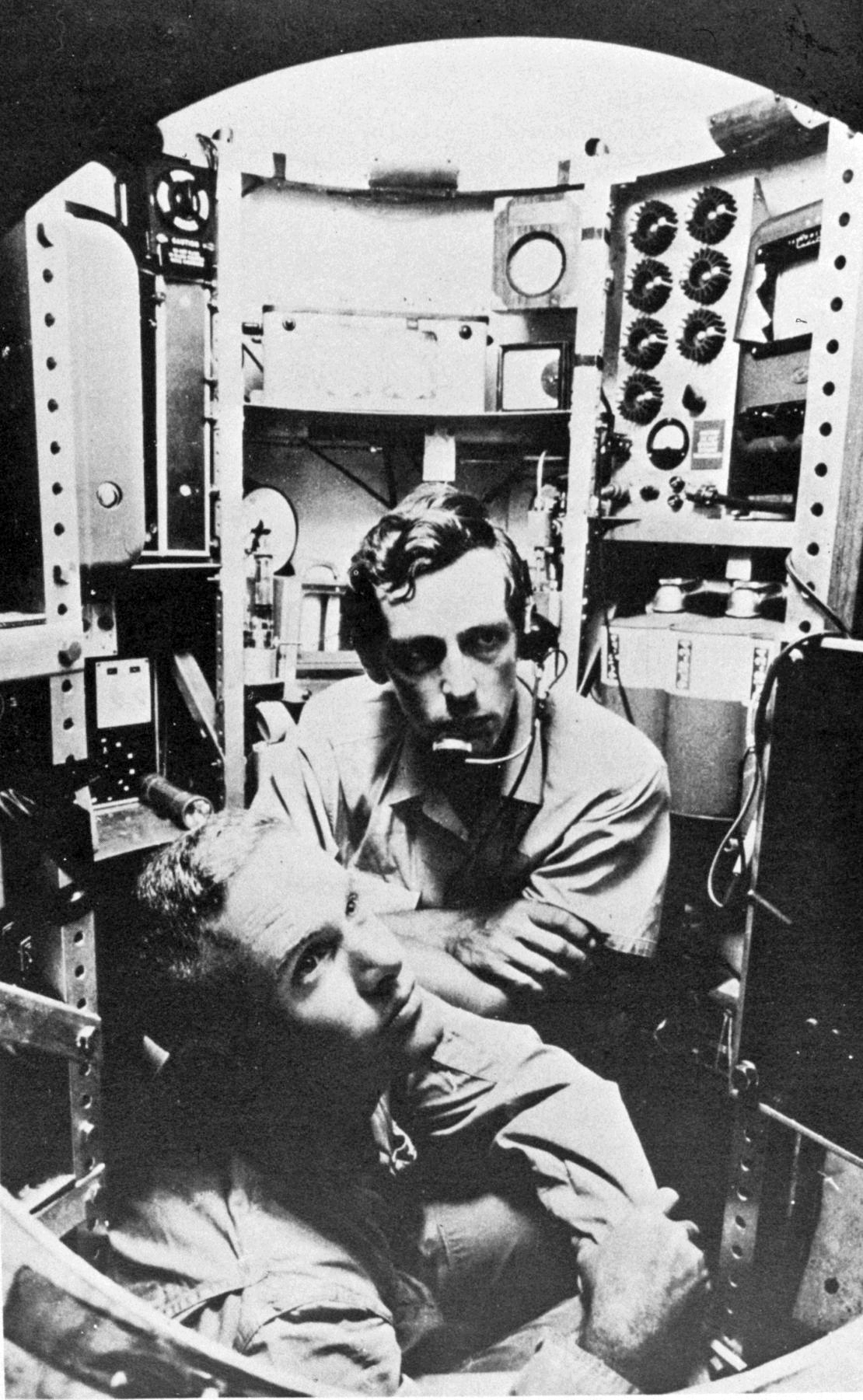
Don Walsh and Jacques Piccard inside the Bathyscaphe Trieste

Project Nekton was the codename for a series of very shallow test dives (three of them in Apra Harbor) and also deep-submergence operations in the Pacific Ocean near Guam that ended with the United States Navy-owned research bathyscaphe Trieste entering the Challenger Deep, the deepest surveyed point in the world's oceans.

The series of eight dives began with two harbor dives, then a Pacific Ocean test dive at Guam, by the newly modified Trieste, which had been modified to dive far deeper than before. After two checkout dives, the first abyssal dive reached a record of 5,530 m (18,150 ft) on 15 November 1959. The series included a record deep dive to near the bottom of the Nero Deep in the Mariana Trench at 7,300 m (24,000 ft), and finally culminated with a trip to the bottom of the Challenger Deep at 10,911 m (35,797 ft), on 23 January 1960.

The project name was proposed by oceanographer Dr. Robert S. Dietz in early 1958, as plans to modify the Trieste bathyscaphe to go to the deepest part of the oceans were being contemplated. It is in reference to ocean life that actively swims (nekton) as opposed to the plankton organisms that only drift. The bathyscaphe Trieste to be used for Project Nekton was able to move independently, in contrast to tethered bathyspheres. The Trieste featured two electric motors, each with a propeller, of 1.5 kilowatts (2 hp) each. These allowed it to move forward, backward and to turn horizontally. A maximum speed of one knot (0.5 m/s) was attainable over a few miles distance.

== Objectives ==
Aside from the prestige of being the first to make the deepest dive, the Navy Electronics Laboratory held the following objectives for Project Nekton in furtherance of its underwater sound research for SOSUS and sonar development:

- precise determination of the sound velocity throughout the water column being explored
- determination of the water column's temperature and salinity structure
- water current measurements
- light penetration, visibility, and bio-luminescence observations
- distribution of organisms under observation in the water column and on the sea floor
- marine geological study of the trench environment
- engineering tests of equipment at great depths
- determination of pressure effects on hull polarity

== Operations ==
Trieste departed San Diego on 5 October 1959 for Guam aboard the freighter SS Santa Mariana to participate in Project Nekton, a series of very deep dives near Guam, culminating in a descent to the Mariana Trench. It had been modified with a larger gasoline float, larger ballast tubs, and a newly designed heavy pressure sphere (made by Krupp in Germany), after having been purchased by the Office of Naval Research, which undertook the modification.

Guam was selected for the test dives because it was a major naval base with complete facilities only 200 mi (320 km) from the Challenger Deep. The tug USS Wandank (ATA-204) towed Trieste between Guam and the dive sites where project flagship USS Lewis (DE-535) tracked the submerged Trieste with sonar. The first two test dives in the Nekton series were conducted at Guam in the Apra Harbor, then a third dive off the Western flank of Guam reached 4,900 feet (1,500 m). This dive was intended to have the same duration as the deep dive for an endurance test to reveal material failures or hazards not encountered during shorter dives. Trieste could surface in 20 minutes from this depth if problems arose, but no problems were encountered.

=== Fourth dive ===
The fourth dive in the Nekton series was a very deep dive into the Nero Deep of the Marianas Trench. This deep had been discovered in 1899 by the USS Nero (AC-17) in a search for a deep sea cable route to the orient. It was dive 61 in a long series of bathyscaphe dives supervised by Jacques Piccard. Trieste reached 18,600 feet (5,700 m), later recalibrated to 18,150 feet (5,530 m) depth, to the sea floor, on 15 November 1959. This dive set a new world record depth formerly held by the French Navy for the 13,440 ft (4,100 m) descent on their bathyscaphe FNRS-3 off Dakar, Senegal in 1954.

Northeasterly trade winds caused high seas slowing the tow to the dive site, and raising concern about damage to Trieste's topside equipment as she nosed into the waves. Seas moderated on the day of the dive, and pre-dive inspection found no damage. The surface vessels lost underwater telephone contact with Trieste as the bathyscaphe descended below 6,000 ft (1,800 m) and communication below that depth was limited to a few manually keyed signal codes from the bathyscaphe transducer. A small boat remained over the dive site while the tug and destroyer stood off 2 mi (3.2 km) to avoid damaging Trieste if the bathyscaphe surfaced beneath them. Just before the bathyscaphe surfaced, its crew was startled by a loud "bang" as the expanding bathyscaphe segments broke their epoxy joint seals at a depth of 30 ft (9.1 m). Inspection after returning to Guam revealed some water leakage along the seals between the three sections of the sphere. Trieste was taken out of the water to replace the epoxy glue seals and augment them with mechanical holding ring bands. Some new instrumentation was also installed during this repair period.

Dive 62 (fifth in the Nekton series) was another Apra Harbor dive to test the new instrumentation. There was also some concern about possible leakage between the bathyscaphe sphere segments near the surface, although pressure was expected to seal the joints at depth. The next dive (sixth in the series, dive 63 for Piccard) was another checkout dive on 18 December, west of Guam. It reached 5,700 feet (1,700 m) to test the holding bands and new instrumentation at that depth. Although not usually considered as part of the counted series, there were five shallow 100 ft (30 m) dives for crew training purposes in Apra Harbor before the next deep dive of the series.

=== Seventh dive ===
The next dive (dive 64 in a series, seventh in the Nekton series) reached 24,000 feet (7,300 m) in the Nero Deep in the Mariana Trench 70 miles (110 km) off Guam. Although this dive set a new depth record, there had been some damage to topside equipment during the tow to the dive site which prevented this dive from quite reaching the bottom, 48 feet (15 m) below. Topside damage to the gasoline release valve prevented negative buoyancy adjustment after ballast had been released when the bottom was sounded, and once rising, the bathyscaphe could not be stopped. The crew was startled by implosion noises as Trieste descended past 20,000 ft (6,100 m). A portable navigation light which should have been removed prior to diving imploded, and a topside pipe stanchion recently installed for safety purposes collapsed because no compensating holes had been drilled. The implosions caused no structural or instrument damage, and a newly installed underwater telephone allowed voice communication with the surface at greater depths.

=== Diving into the Challenger Deep ===
Lewis arrived at the dive site on 20 January to locate the Challenger Deep for Trieste's dive. The ship's fathometer was not designed for such depths. Lewis made depth determinations by dropping explosive charges over the side and timing the interval between the explosion and the return echo. Over 300 explosive charges were used to locate the target trench area 4 mi (6.4 km) long and 1 mi (1.6 km) wide.

On dive 65 (eighth in the Nekton series), on 23 January 1960, Trieste reached the ocean floor in the Challenger Deep (the deepest southern part of the Mariana Trench), carrying Jacques Piccard (son of the boat's designer Auguste Piccard) and Lieutenant Don Walsh, USN. This was the first time a vessel, crewed or uncrewed, had reached the deepest point in the Earth's oceans. The onboard systems indicated a depth of 11,521 metres (37,799 ft), although this was later revised to 10,916 metres (35,814 ft) and more accurate measurements made in 1995 have found the Challenger Deep to be slightly shallower, at 10,911 metres (35,797 ft).

The descent to the ocean floor took 4 hours and 48 minutes at a descent rate of 0.914 m/s (3.29 km/h; 2.04 mph). After passing 30,000 feet (9,000 m) one of the outer Plexiglas window panes cracked, shaking the entire vessel. The two men spent barely twenty minutes at the ocean floor, eating chocolate bars to keep their strength. The temperature in the cabin was a mere 45 °F (7 °C) at the time. While on the bottom at maximum depth, Piccard and Walsh unexpectedly regained the ability to communicate with Wandank using a sonar/hydrophone voice communications system. At a speed of almost one mile per second (1.6 km/s) (about five times the speed of sound in air), it took about seven seconds for a voice message to travel from the craft to the surface ship and another seven seconds for answers to return.

While on the bottom, Piccard and Walsh reported they observed a number of small sole and flounder swimming away, indicating that at least some vertebrate life might withstand the extremes of pressure in any of the Earth's oceans. They noted that the floor of the Challenger Deep consisted of "diatomaceous ooze". The ascent to surface took three hours, fifteen minutes.

== Successor exploration programs in the Challenger Deep ==
The next crewed craft to reach the bottom of the Challenger Deep was Deepsea Challenger, on 25 March 2012. A Japanese robotic craft Kaikō reached the bottom of the Challenger Deep in 1995. The Nereus hybrid remotely operated vehicle (HROV) reached the bottom on 31 May 2009.

== See also ==
List of people who descended to Challenger Deep
