= MR1 =

MR1 or MR-1 may refer to:

- Bristol M.R.1, an experimental biplane
- HAWAII MR1, a sea floor imaging system
- Major histocompatibility complex, class I-related
- Mercury-Redstone 1, an unsuccessful unmanned American space mission
- PNKD, or myofibrillogenesis regulator 1
- Shewanella oneidensis MR-1, a bacterium
- Hadoop architecture Map/Reduce version 1
- Beijing–Nanning–Hanoi through train
