= USS Lewis =

USS Lewis has been the name of more than one United States Navy ship, and may refer to:

- USS Lewis (1861), a sailing ship of 308 tons, purchased 20 October 1861 for use in the Stone Fleet
- USS Lewis (DE-535), a destroyer escort in commission from 1944 to 1946

See also

- USS Lewis and Clark
- USS Milton Lewis (DE-772)
