= Vityaz-D Autonomous Underwater Vehicle =

Full-ocean depth, fully autonomous deep submergence vehicle

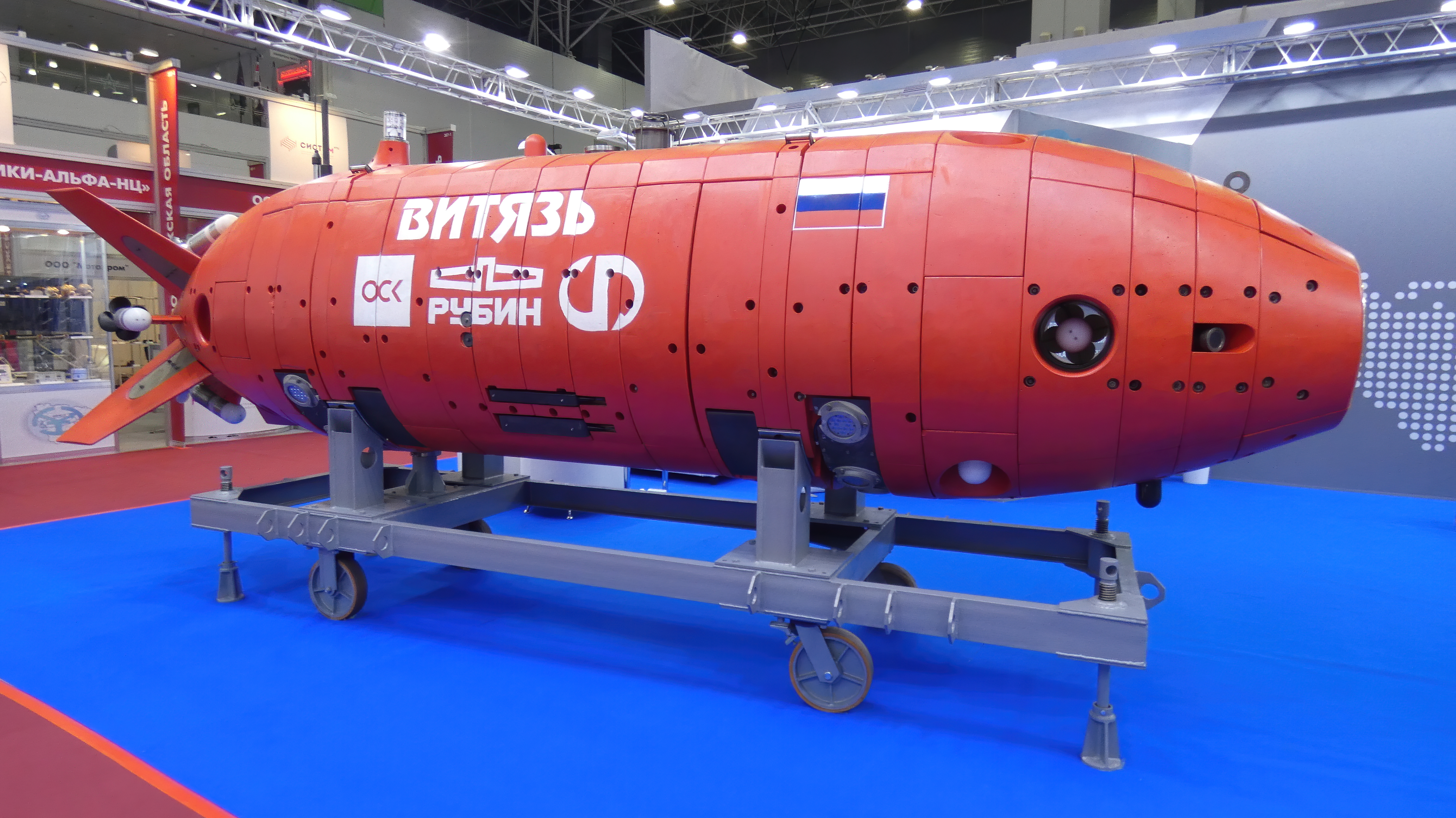
- Underwater vehicle during the "Armiya 2021" exhibition

History

Russian NavyRussia
- Name: Vityaz-D ANPA/AUV
- Builder: Rubin Central Design Bureau for Marine Engineering
- Sponsored by: Fond Perspektivnyh Issledovaniy (FPI)
- Completed: 2019
- In service: 2020
- Home port: Vladivostok
- Identification: Vityaz-D
- Status: Active
- Notes: Mother Ship: Rescue Tug Fotiy Krylov

General characteristics
- Type: AUV or UUV
- Tonnage: 5.7 tons
- Length: 5.7 m (19 ft)
- Beam: 1.4 m (4.6 ft)
- Installed power: Batteries
- Propulsion: Four electric propulsors and ten small electric maneuvering thrusters
- Speed: 1 meter/second
- Endurance: 24 hours
- Test depth: 12,000 m (39,000 ft)
- Complement: 0
- Sensors & processing systems: Side-scan sonar; echo sounders; search sonar; video cameras
- Notes: System consists of an unmanned autonomous deep submersible (ANPA SGP Vityaz-D); a deep sea bottom station (GDS SN) and a shipboard communications and control suite on the mother ship.

The Vityaz-D is the first full-ocean depth, fully autonomous deep submergence vehicle.

This Russian Autonomous Underwater Vehicle (AUV) was designed and developed by the Rubin Central Design Bureau for Marine Engineering in St. Petersburg, Russia under contract to the Advanced Research Foundation (Russian acronym: FPI, Fond Perspektivnyh Issledovaniy). The development of Vityaz-D began in September 2017. The keel-laying ceremony of the AUV was held at Rubin's assembly plant for experimental production in November 2018.

It was tested in May 2020 with autonomous dives to 2400 meters in the Sea of Japan, to 5200 meters in the Philippine Sea, and culminating with a 10,028 meter dive into the Mariana Trench (note that the greatest depth of the Mariana Trench is 10,925 meters – about 900 meters deeper than this Vityaz-D dive on 8 May 2020).

Russia revealed the Vityaz-D program at the Army-2020 International Military and Technical Forum held in Kubinka, outside Moscow in July 2020. The Vityaz-D autonomous underwater vehicle was named in honor of the R/V Vityaz, which for nearly 20 years was the flagship of the Soviet scientific research fleet.

== Mariana Trench ==
The Vityaz-D reached a depth of 10,028 meters on 8 May 2020, spending over three hours studying the Mariana Trench. Its mother ship was the rescue tug Fotiy Krylov.

During Pacific dives, the Vityaz-D tested a unique system of long-range audio-visual communication. At the bottom of the Mariana Trench, the Vityaz-D laid a flag at the bottom to commemorate the 75th anniversary of Victory Day.

Communications with the Vityaz-D was by means of a unique "sound-guided communication, which has no foreign analogues" – apparently automatically directing communication bursts along a selected acoustic-ray path – a technology not found in public Western sources. Communications with the AUV were continuous and successful during the 10,028 meter depth mission. The underwater acoustic communication link between the mother ship and the Vityaz-D involved both sonic and ultrasonic channels. This new system (name undisclosed) allows transmission of both text and low-quality images, as well as updating command and control instructions.

== Impact ==
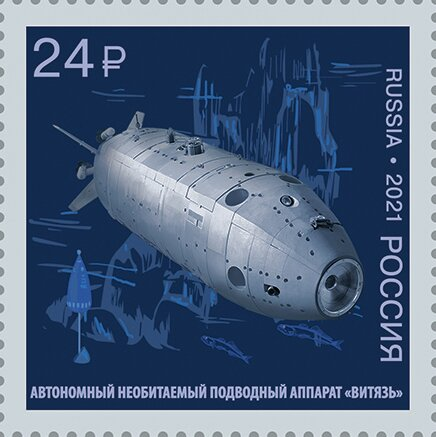
Vityaz-D on a 2021 stamp of Russia

Georgy Vinogradov, a senior researcher at the Shirshov Institute of Oceanology of the Russian Academy of Sciences and a participant in diving the MIR deep-submergence vehicles, stated: "I believe that the use of this technology will open up many new opportunities for scientific research. Underwater vehicles are now an obvious trend in ocean exploration. Each of the ways of penetrating into the depth – with the help of manned, remotely operated and unmanned vehicles – has its own strengths and weaknesses. On one of these paths, a big step has just been taken forward."

The editors of GlobalSecurity.org perhaps noted the significance of this development most succinctly: "Once UAVs came to be regarded as reusable aircraft rather than expendable [aerial] munitions, there was a quantum leap in the size of the vehicles and the purposes to which they were put. Now such a revolutionary phase transition is underway underwater. In both cases, the foundation was the inexorable unfolding of the gift that keeps on giving, the miracle of Moore's law. Computers onboard the vehicles could take on greater responsibility for more complex tasks ... At first, underwater vehicles required onboard human presence, but over time this guidance could be provided remotely via a cable tether. Now the tether has been severed, as the computers onboard the vehicle can execute complex tasks in response to simple directions."

== Future ==
"The Russian Navy plans to replace its fleet of unmanned deep-sea submersibles with the Vityaz-D drone for its military operations."
