= USS Lewis and Clark =

USS Lewis and Clark may refer to:

- USS Lewis and Clark (SSBN-644), a Benjamin Franklin-class ballistic missile submarine of the U.S. Navy
- USNS Lewis and Clark (T-AKE-1), a dry cargo ship of the U.S. Military Sealift Command

== See also ==
- USS Lewis
