= USS Wandank (ATA-204) =

Tugboat of the United States Navy

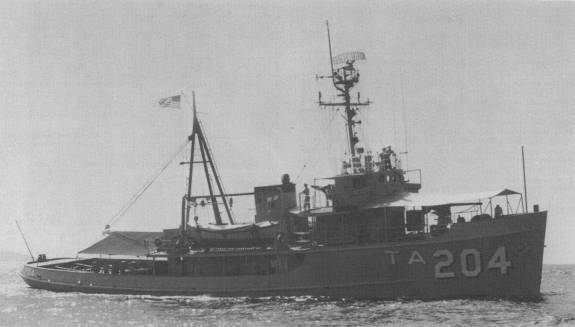
- USS Wandank (ATA-204) in the Pacific Ocean in 1966-1967

History

United States
- Name: USS ATA-204 (1945-1952); USS Wandank (1952-1971)
- Builder: Gulfport Boiler and Welding Works, Port Arthur, Texas
- Laid down: 25 September 1944
- Launched: 9 November 1944
- Commissioned: 18 January 1945
- Decommissioned: 26 November 1947
- Recommissioned: 3 May 1952
- Decommissioned: 1 July 1971
- Renamed: From USS ATA-204 to USS Wandank 1952
- Stricken: 1 August 1973
- Honors and awards: 3 battle stars for Vietnam War service
- Fate: Sunk as target, 1979
- Notes: Department of the Interior service as MV Wandank 1971-1973 and from 1973

General characteristics
- Class & type: Sotoyomo-class auxiliary fleet tug
- Displacement: 610 tons (light); 860 tons (full load)
- Length: 143 ft 0 in (43.59 m)
- Beam: 33 ft 10 in (10.31 m)
- Draft: 13 ft 2 in (4.01 m)
- Speed: 13 knots
- Complement: 45
- Armament: 1 × 3"/50 dual purpose gun; 2 × twin 40 mm antiaircraft guns

The second USS Wandank (ATA-204), originally USS ATA-204, was a United States Navy auxiliary ocean tug in commission from 1945 to 1947 and again from 1952 to 1971. The ship is possibly best known for supporting scientific operations in the Marianas, in particular serving as communication relay and support ship for the bathyscaphe Trieste in Project Nekton; she towed the bathyscaphe some 260 nautical miles (482 kilometers) from Guam to the vicinity of the Challenger Deep, where, on 23 January 1960, Trieste descended to a record 10,911 metres (35,797 feet).

== Construction and commissioning ==
Originally projected as steel-hulled rescue tug USS ATR—131, Wandank was laid down as USS ATA-204 on 25 September 1944 at Port Arthur, Texas, by the Gulfport Boiler and Welding Works. She was launched on 9 November 1944 and commissioned on 18 January 1945. She was 143 ft in length and displaced 835 tons.

== First period in commission, 1945-1947 ==
=== World War II service, 1945 ===
Following her shakedown in the Caribbean, ATA-204 got underway on 23 February 1945 for the Panama Canal, en route to World War II service in the Pacific Ocean. She operated with the United States Pacific Fleet through the end of hostilities, performing services at locales ranging from Pearl Harbor, Hawaii, to the Marshall Islands.

=== Postwar service and decommissioning, 1945-1947 ===
After hostilities ended on 15 August 1945, ATA-204 returned to the United States at San Francisco, California, late in August 1945. She soon shifted to the Puget Sound Navy Yard, Bremerton, Washington. She operated in the 13th Naval District until she was decommissioned on 26 November 1947 and placed in reserve.

== Second period in commission, 1952-1971 ==
=== Pearl Harbor service, 1952-1955 ===
The onset of the Korean War (1950-1953) gave ATA-204 a new lease on life by triggering the expansion of the United States Navy. ATA-204 was reactivated on 17 April 1952 at Astoria, Oregon, for assignment to the 14th Naval District. Recommissioned at Pearl Harbor on 3 May 1952 she was renamed USS Wandank while retaining her "ATA-204" designation. She operated out of Pearl Harbor until 1955, providing tug and tow services for the Pacific Fleet, and occasionally deployed to American Samoa and other Pacific islands with tows.

=== Mariana Islands service, 1955-1967 ===
On 9 September 1955, Wandank was transferred to the Mariana Islands. There, she towed barges of supplies, stood ready to assist in search-and-rescue operations, provided target services for gunnery and torpedo exercises, and conducted local surveillance missions out of Guam into the 1960s.

During this deployment, Wandank supported scientific operations in addition to her more routine duties. In January 1960, for example, she served as communication relay and support ship for the bathyscaphe Trieste in Project Nekton; she towed the bathyscaphe some 260 nautical miles (482 kilometers) from Guam to the vicinity of the Challenger Deep, where, on 23 January 1960, Trieste descended to a record 37,000 feet (11,000 meters). Hydrophone gear aboard Wandank was still able to communicate with the craft once on the bottom, although the sound waves took seven seconds to make a one-way journey from ship to bathyscaphe, which was nearly seven miles deep.

On occasion, Wandank's operations nonetheless assumed a dangerous character during tropical storms. During one of these storms, which occurred October 19, 1963, Wandank was trapped between two typhoons while en route to her annual buoy maintenance duty at Chichi Jima in the Bonin Islands. In the heavy seas, her tow line parted, leaving USS YCV-18 adrift. During the ensuing recovery operations, the tug's Lieutenant JG, J. B. Clark, ordered everyone off the fantail out of harm's way. While operating the winch he was knocked overboard when the tow line snapped. Several crewmen jumped in to try to save him but were not able to get him back on board.

In November 1964, Wandank conducted a survey of the Solomon Islands in a joint project sponsored by the University of Hawaii's Institute of Geophysics and the Office of Naval Research; during the course of this operation, she measured the earth's gravity in the area.

In July 1966, Wandank rendezvoused with Japanese merchantman Yeiji Maru, which had been experiencing engine trouble, and escorted the distressed ship to Guam. Later that year, she towed SS Old Westbury to a safe haven, relieving auxiliary ocean tug USS Sunnadin (ATA-197), which had run low on fuel on 11 November 1966.

The year 1967 passed with much the same routine.

=== Vietnam War and Mariana Islands service, 1968-1971 ===
In 1968, Wandank participated in her first operations in connection with the Vietnam War. She towed gasoline barge USS YOG-131 from Guam to Da Nang, South Vietnam, from 3 January 1968 to 15 January 1968. After returning from Vietnamese waters, she performed island survey duties in the western Caroline Islands and subsequently helped to search for floating drydock USS AFDM-6, which had broken loose from her civilian tow vessel. Wandank next participated in special operations into the summer of 1968 before making a second voyage to Vietnamese waters, towing USS APL-30 to Vung Tau, South Vietnam, from 16 August 1968 to 1 September 1968.

Wandank commenced in 1969 with more island surveillance missions in the central Caroline Islands, sending a landing party ashore from her crew to ascertain the needs of the islanders who lived under the care and protection of the Trust Territory of the Pacific Islands. She conducted a training mission to Yokosuka, Japan, in February and March 1969 before returning to a schedule of surveillance operations in the northern Mariana Islands. She trained for possible participation in Project Apollo in April 1969 before she towed three barges from Sattahip, Thailand, to Vung Tau, South Vietnam, from 13 April 1969 to 8 May 1969.

Upon returning to the vicinity of the Mariana and Caroline Islands soon thereafter, she conducted local operations through the end of 1969. Wandank interrupted this duty only long enough to tow landing craft utility USS LCU-1483 to Ponape Island and USS LCU-1497 to Majuro, from 25 November 1969 to 4 December 1969.

During her final full year of naval service, 1970, Wandank conducted local operations out of her home port of Apra Harbor, Guam.

She got underway from Guam on 20 January 1971 for Hong Kong and then escorted three Asheville-class patrol gunboats to Subic Bay, the Philippines and Cam Ranh Bay. South Vietnam, serving as a communication back-up vessel. She later escorted two gunboats from Cam Ranh Bay to Hong Kong before returning to island surveillance duties.

== Final decommissioning and disposal ==
Decommissioned at Guam on 1 July 1971, Wandank was simultaneously turned over to the Department of the Interior for service in the Trust Territory of the Pacific Islands. Returned to the Navy on 22 May 1973, Wandank was adjudged unfit for further Navy service and accordingly struck from the Navy List on 1 August 1973. Subsequently, returned to the Department of the Interior as her original designation number ATR-131, she resumed service in the Trust Territory of the Pacific Islands on island surveillance and local towing duties.

She was finally sunk as a target ship in 1979.

== Honors and awards ==
Wandank was awarded three battle stars for her Vietnam War service.
