= USS Lewis (DE-535) =

John C. Butler-class destroyer escort of the United States Navy

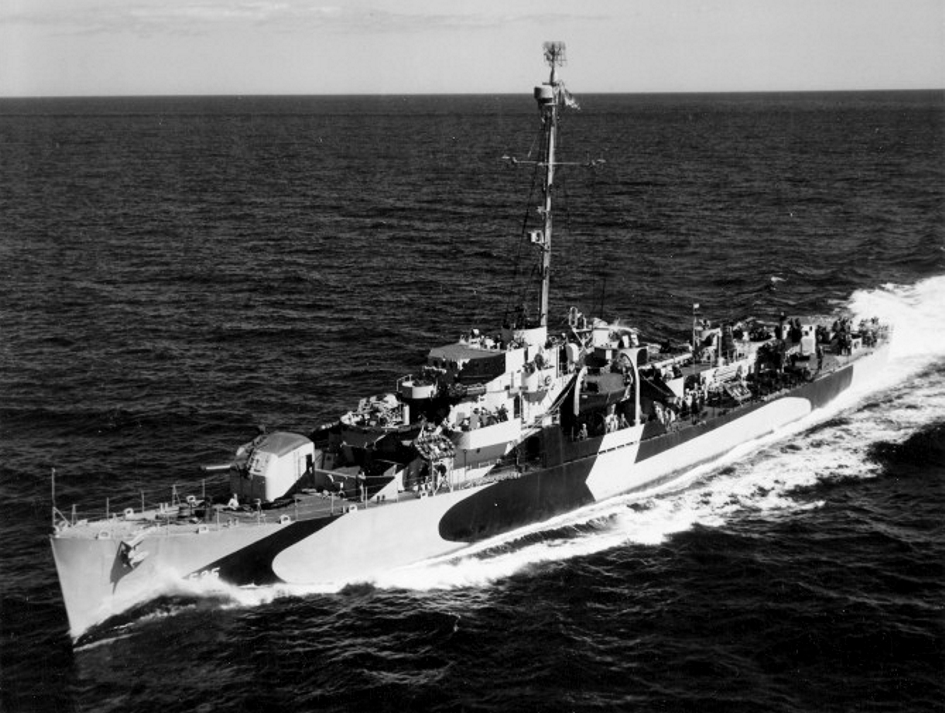

History

United States
- Name: Lewis
- Namesake: Victor Alan Lewis
- Builder: Boston Navy Yard
- Laid down: 3 November 1943
- Launched: 7 December 1943
- Commissioned: 5 September 1944
- Decommissioned: 1 May 1946
- In service: 28 March 1952
- Out of service: 27 May 1960
- Stricken: 1 January 1966
- Fate: Sunk as target in 1966

General characteristics
- Class & type: John C. Butler-class destroyer escort
- Displacement: 1,350 long tons (1,372 t)
- Length: 306 ft (93 m) (oa)
- Beam: 36 ft 10 in (11.23 m)
- Draft: 13 ft 4 in (4.06 m) (max)
- Propulsion: 2 boilers, 2 geared steam turbines, 12,000 shp (8,900 kW), 2 screws
- Speed: 24 knots (44 km/h; 28 mph)
- Range: 6,000 nmi (11,000 km; 6,900 mi) at 12 kn (22 km/h; 14 mph)
- Complement: 14 officers, 201 enlisted
- Armament: 2 × single 5 in (127 mm) guns; 2 × twin 40 mm (1.6 in) AA guns; 10 × single 20 mm (0.79 in) AA guns; 1 × triple 21 in (533 mm) torpedo tubes; 8 × depth charge throwers; 1 × Hedgehog ASW mortar; 2 × depth charge racks

USS Lewis (DE-535) was a John C. Butler-class destroyer escort in service with the United States Navy from 1944 to 1946 and from 1952 to 1960. She was finally sunk as a target in 1966.

== Namesake ==
Victor Alan Lewis was born on 2 August 1919 in Somerville, Massachusetts. He graduated from Stetson High School in Randolph, Massachusetts, and attended Springfield College. Before graduating he enlisted in the United States Naval Reserve as a Seaman 2d class and reported for duty to the Squantum Naval Reserve Aviation Base, Boston, for flight training on 17 February 1941. Following appointment as an Aviation Cadet on 29 May, and further training at Naval Air Station Jacksonville and Naval Air Station Miami, he was commissioned Ensign as a designated Naval Aviator on 27 December 1941. After additional flight training at the Naval Air Station, Norfolk, Virginia he reported to Torpedo Squadron 8 (VT-8) in the Advanced carrier Training Group on 3 February 1942. Although half the squadron deployed with USS Hornet on the Doolittle Raid, he stayed behind in an 80-man detachment to take delivery of new Grumman TBF Avenger torpedo bombers. After a short training period out of Naval Air Station Quonset Point, Rhode Island, the detachment flew to California and then took the USS Kitty Hawk to Hawaii. Shortly after their arrival at Ford Island, the detachment split again and six bombers under the command of Lt. Langdon K. Fieberling flew 1,300 miles (2,100 km) to Midway Island on 1 June.

Assigned to Commander, Base Air Defense, the VT-8 detachment at Midway joined the Marine and Army Air Force aircraft preparing for combat operations against the expected Imperial Japanese Navy attack. Following sighting reports of IJN ships and aircraft northwest of the island, Midway's defending fighters scrambled followed by all operational attack aircraft, including the six VT-8 bombers. Once airborne, the VT-8 pilots joined up and stepped down into two three-plane sections, with Lewis flying the middle aircraft of the rear section. Just after the bombers climbed to 2,000 feet (610 m) and headed northwest, the formation was passed by two or three Japanese aircraft inbound to Midway. By ducking into the clouds and climbing to 4,000 feet (1,200 m), the detachment avoided any Japanese fighters and continued on toward their targets. Shortly after 07:00, the six TBF's spotted the IJN fleet from a range of about 15 miles (24 km) and closed to attack. Japanese fighters spotted them in turn, however, and the unescorted bombers were quickly engaged by Mitsubishi A6M Zero fighters. Mauled by fighters and anti-aircraft fire, five of the bombers were shot down, with the sixth limping home after sustaining some 70-bullet holes. Lewis, his radioman AM3c Nelson L. Carr and turret gunner EM3c John W. Mehltretter all perished in the attack. He was posthumously awarded the Navy Cross.

== History ==
Lewis was laid down by the Boston Navy Yard on 3 November 1943, launched 7 December 1943; and commissioned 5 September 1944.

After a shakedown cruise to Bermuda 28 September to 31 October 1944, Lewis received a week of upkeep at Boston before sailing to Casco Bay, Maine, for a few days training in early November. In company with Henry A. Wiley, Lewis escorted the battleships Texas and Arkansas south on 10 November. Joined two days later by the battleship Missouri, aircraft carriers Wake Island and Shamrock Bay, the task unit proceeded through the Panama Canal and on to Hawaii via San Diego and San Francisco, arriving at Pearl Harbor on 5 December. The destroyer escort got underway on 26 December to escort merchant convoy PD220-T, shepherding her charges to Eniwetok without incident on 4 January 1945. Lewis sailed to Ulithi that same day, arriving at that atoll on 10 January. With large-scale operations in the Philippines requiring significant logistical support, Lewis spent the rest of the month conducted anti-submarine sweeps along the shipping routes and near Yap Island.

On 1 February, Lewis, along with Silverstein, Howard F. Clark and Raymond, formed Task Unit 50.7.2, an anti-submarine reserve unit assigned to the Logistics Support Force for the invasion of Iwo Jima. The destroyer escorts also provided screening services for Task Force 58 during air strikes against Japan in mid-February. The same task unit left Ulithi on 21 March for the Okinawa operation, screening Task Group 50.8 at sea in between escort and replenishment trips to Ulithi and Guam. During these operations Lewis was caught in the heavy typhoon of 2 June, at one point heeling over to 67 degrees. Lewis continued screening operations until 2 July when she was assigned to the Ulithi Surface Patrol and Escort Group, which was responsible for radar and anti-submarine services at Ulithi and providing escort services to periodic Okinawa-bound convoys.

Lewis departed the Far East on 15 September and sailed for Hawaii, arriving at Pearl Harbor later that month. She remained there until 18 November when she sailed for California, arriving at San Pedro on 23 November. Transferred to the 9th Fleet, Lewis decommissioned on 31 May 1946 and entered the Reserve Fleet at San Diego on 30 July 1946.

== Korean War ==
Following the outbreak of the Korean War in June 1950, Lewis was refitted at the Mare Island Navy Yard, Vallejo, California, and recommissioned there 28 March 1952.

Following shakedown training out of San Diego in May and June, Lewis got underway for Korea on 19 July 1952, making stops at Midway as well as Yokosuka and Sasebo, Japan, before reporting to the Commander, United Nations Blockade and Escort Force on 11 August. Assigned to the East Coast Blockade and Escort Group, Lewis operated with Republic of Korea (RoK) patrol boats and minesweepers with Commander, Task Element 95.21 embarked. Starting on 26 August, the destroyer began two months of almost nightly shore bombardment missions against time sensitive targets, firing illumination and high explosive rounds against enemy truck and oxcart convoys, troop concentrations and railroad repair gangs. Highlights included shooting up two sampans in Wonsan harbor on 3 September, 5 September destruction of a 40 boxcar train with almost 90 rounds of high capacity and white phosphorus shells and 16 September bombardment of a 60-man railroad repair team.

Assigned to TE 95.20 on 11 October, Lewis and RoK PC 706 carried out anti-shipping patrols between Wonsan and Hungnam and warned neutral shipping such as Japanese fishing boats out of the coastal defense zone. Two nights later, Lewis took fire from a radar-controlled enemy gun battery, observing 28 air bursts and 56 water splashes during the duel, some of which exploded as close as 20 yards (18 m) while others bracketed the evading destroyer escort out to 12,000 yards (11,000 m). In return, the destroyer escort fired 178 high explosive and 36 white phosphorus rounds, observing one direct hit on a gun emplacement followed by a secondary explosion and fire. The following day, 14 October, Lewis spotted five sampans off Cha Ho and drove them ashore with radar-directed long range gunnery. A week later, on 21 October 1952, Lewis came to the aid of two RoK minesweepers under fire in Wonsan harbor. As she approached, at least four enemy batteries opened up on the destroyer escort. Lewis returned fire and laid down a smoke screen to cover the minesweepers retreat. Shortly thereafter the destroyer escort took two 75 mm (3.0 in) shell hits, the first plowed into the forward fire room and pierced the No. 1 boiler – killing six fire and boilermen outright and mortally wounding a seventh; Fireman Milton S. Wheeler was awarded the Silver Star for carrying several of his injured shipmates to safety during this attack. The second hit exploded on the main deck, port side, lightly wounding one sailor. Following hull and machinery repairs at Yokosuka in mid-November, the destroyer escort sailed for home on 17 November, arriving in San Diego via Pearl Harbor on 2 December.

== Post-Korean War ==
Following an overhaul at Long Beach Naval Shipyard in early 1953, Lewis carried out refresher training and local operations out of San Diego through mid-June. The destroyer escort then made a short trip to Mazatlan, Mexico, 25–28 June, before preparing for another overseas deployment. Departing San Diego on 14 July, the warship arrived at Guam via Pearl Harbor and Midway on 31 July. With the Korean armistice signed just four days previously, Lewis did not conduct combat operations, instead patrolling the Marianas Islands, the Ryukyus and kept watch for communist violations of the truce in the Yellow Sea through the summer and into the fall. After a brief visit to Japan in late October, she turned for home before Christmas, returning to San Diego via Midway and Pearl Harbor on 18 December.

After another four-month overhaul at Long Beach, the destroyer escort carried out refresher training before deploying again on 10 August 1954. With duties similar to her last deployment, Lewis cruised off Okinawa and the east coast of Korea before returning home on 19 December. An almost identical deployment followed on 4 May 1955, with the destroyer escort conducting exercises in Japanese waters and patrolling off Korea before returning to San Diego on 19 November. A longer modernization overhaul followed, with Lewis remaining in San Francisco between 21 November and 14 March 1956.

For her fifth deployment, which began 20 August 1956, the destroyer escort sailed further south, stopping at Kwajalein in the Marshall Islands on 30 August, before proceeding across the equator to Auckland, New Zealand, arriving there for a three-day visit on 7 September. Skirting the northern coast of Australia, Lewis then stopped at Townsville 14–15 September and Darwin 19–21 September before heading on to Singapore, mooring there on 28 September. Following stops at Subic Bay and Hong Kong in October, the warship then received voyage repairs at Yokosuka 16–30 November before returning to the Philippines for a month of operations out of Subic Bay. She then sailed for home in late December, stopping at Guam and Kwajalein for exercises before arriving in San Diego on 18 February 1957.

On 30 September 1957 Lewis deployed again via the South Pacific, visiting Pago Pago on 14 October; Brisbane, Australia, on 20 October; and Manus Island on 30 October before arriving in Guam on 2 November. Three months of island patrol operations in the Marianas followed before Lewis turned for home, arriving in San Diego on 2 March 1958.

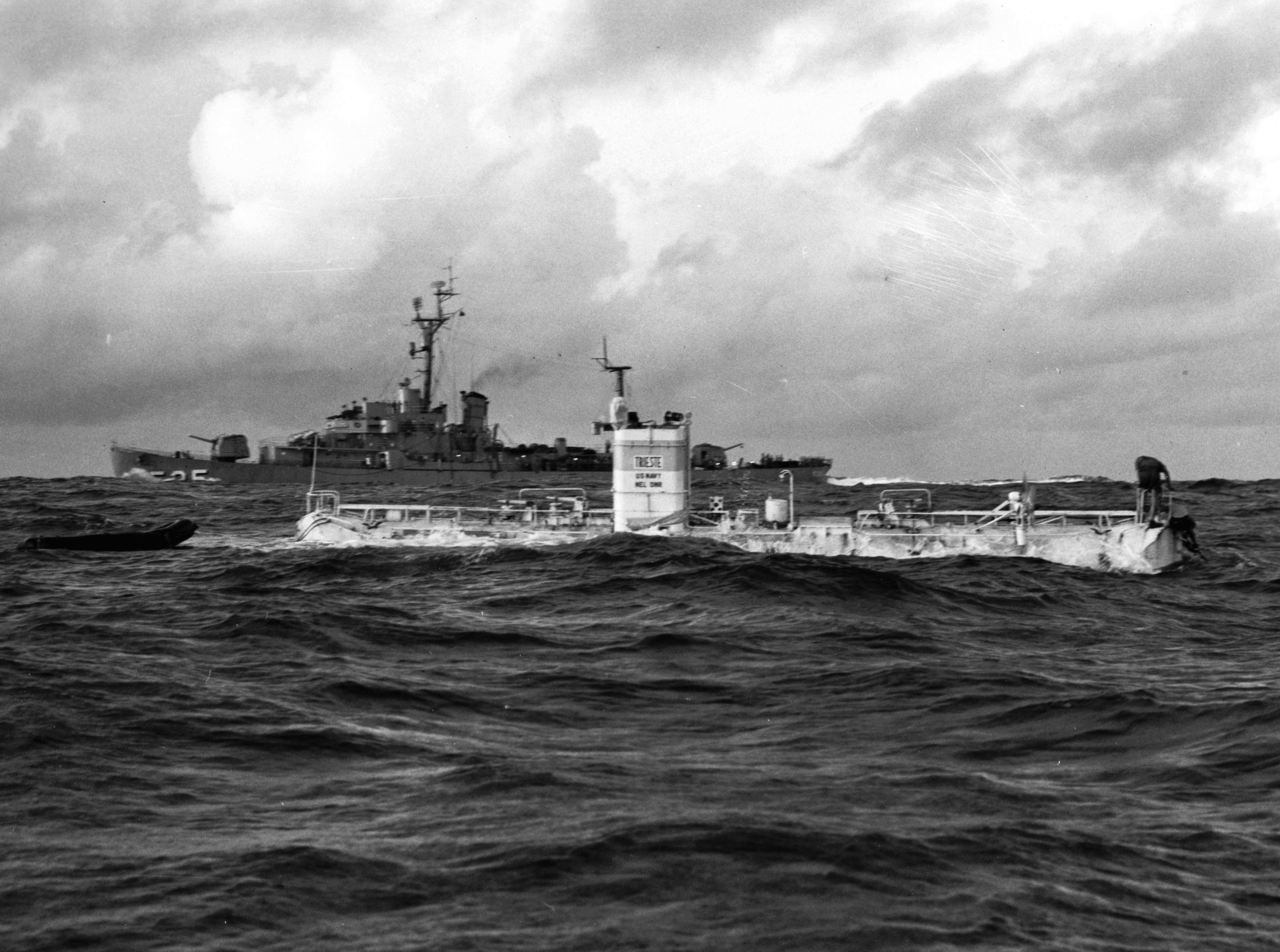
23 January 1960: Trieste just before the record dive. USS Lewis is in the background.

Following an overhaul at San Francisco 1 May – 26 July 1958, the warship's home port was changed to Guam and Lewis sailed to her new station on 14 October, arriving in Apra harbor on 1 November. She conducted island patrol and search-and-rescue operations there for most of the next year, interspersed with port visits to Subic Bay and Hong Kong in mid-April 1959. During the summer and fall Lewis conducted survey work, helping map the deep waters of the region. Starting in November 1959 she took part in Project Nekton, a series of deep dives in the Mariana Trench by Trieste, a deep-diving research bathyscaphe purchased by the Navy the previous year. On 23 January, Lewis helped track Trieste with her sonar gear as the bathyscaphe conducted the deepest crewed dive ever undertaken, to the bottom of trench Challenger Deep 35,798 feet (10,911 m) below the surface.

Lewis departed Guam in February 1960 and sailed to Mare Island, California for inactivation. She decommissioned there on 27 May 1960 and entered the reserve fleet shortly thereafter. Recommended for disposal on 22 December 1965, the destroyer escort was struck from the Navy list on 1 January 1966.

The hulk was then towed out to sea by the fleet tug Tawasa on 21 April 1966 and sunk as a target.

== Honors ==
Lewis received three battle stars for World War II service and one battle star for Korean War service.
