= Trieste (bathyscaphe) =

Deep-sea scientific submersible

Coordinates: 38°52′24″N 76°59′43″W

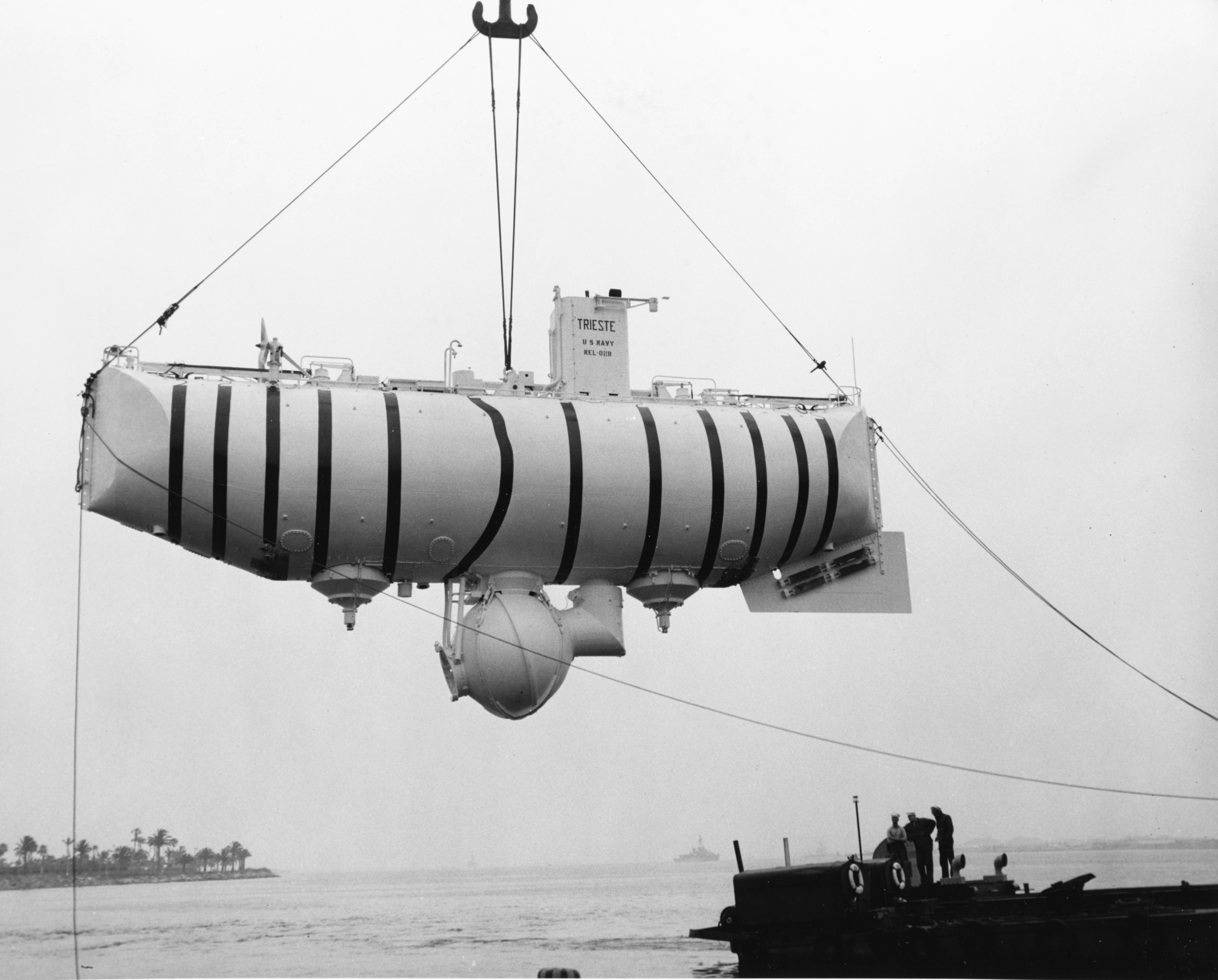
- Trieste shortly after her purchase by the US Navy in 1958

History

Italy
- Name: Trieste
- Builder: Acciaierie Terni (Pressure sphere); Cantieri Riuniti dell'Adriatico (Hull)
- Launched: 1 August 1953
- Fate: Sold to the United States Navy, 1958

United States
- Name: Trieste
- Acquired: 1958
- Decommissioned: 1966
- Reclassified: DSV-0, 1 June 1971
- Status: Preserved as an exhibit in the U.S. Navy Museum

General characteristics
- Type: Bathyscaphe
- Displacement: 50 long tons (51 Mg)
- Length: 59 ft 6 in (18.14 m)
- Beam: 11 ft 6 in (3.51 m)
- Draft: 18 ft 6 in (5.64 m)
- Complement: Two

Trieste is a Swiss-designed, Italian-built deep-diving research bathyscaphe. In 1960, it became the first crewed vessel to reach the bottom of Challenger Deep in the Mariana Trench, the deepest point in Earth's seabed. The mission was the final goal for Project Nekton, a series of dives conducted by the United States Navy in the Pacific Ocean near Guam. The vessel was piloted by Swiss oceanographer Jacques Piccard and US Navy lieutenant Don Walsh. They reached a depth of about 10,916 metres (35,814 ft). The bathyscaphe was designed by Swiss scientist Auguste Piccard, the father of pilot Jacques Piccard. It was built at the Navalmeccanica in Castellammare di Stabia, Italy, and launched on 1 August 1953. The vessel was first owned and operated by Auguste Piccard until it was purchased by the Office of Naval Research in 1958 for US$267,000. This would be equivalent to $3.0 million in 2024. Subsequently the vehicle was turned over to the Bureau of Ships' Naval Electronics Laboratory at San Diego. It was taken out of service in 1966. Since the 1980s, it has been on exhibit in the National Museum of the United States Navy in Washington, D.C.

== Design ==
General arrangement, showing the key features

Trieste was designed by the Swiss scientist Auguste Piccard, based on his previous experience with the bathyscaphe FNRS-2. The term bathyscaphe refers to its capacity to dive and manoeuvre untethered to a ship in contrast to a bathysphere, bathys being ancient Greek meaning "deep" and scaphe being a light, bowl-shaped boat. Trieste consisted of a heavy crew sphere suspended from a hull containing tanks filled with gasoline (petrol) for buoyancy, ballast hoppers filled with iron shot and floodable water tanks to sink. This general configuration remained the same but after modifications to the hull for Project Nekton, which included the dive to Challenger Deep, Trieste was more than 15 metres (49 ft) long. The hull was built by Cantieri Riuniti dell'Adriatico, in the Free Territory of Trieste on the border between Italy and Yugoslavia, now in Italy, hence the name. Recent historical research has highlighted the pivotal role of the Triestine collector and pacifist Diego de Henriquez in the inception of the project. According to historian Enrico Halupca (2019), de Henriquez was instrumental in convincing Auguste and Jacques Piccard to base the construction and initial operations of the bathyscaphe in Trieste between 1948 and 1955. Halupca describes the 'Trieste' as the convergence of the Piccards' scientific ambition and de Henriquez's vision of technology serving peace during the Cold War era. The pressure sphere was built separately and installed on the hull in the Cantiere navale di Castellammare di Stabia, near Naples.

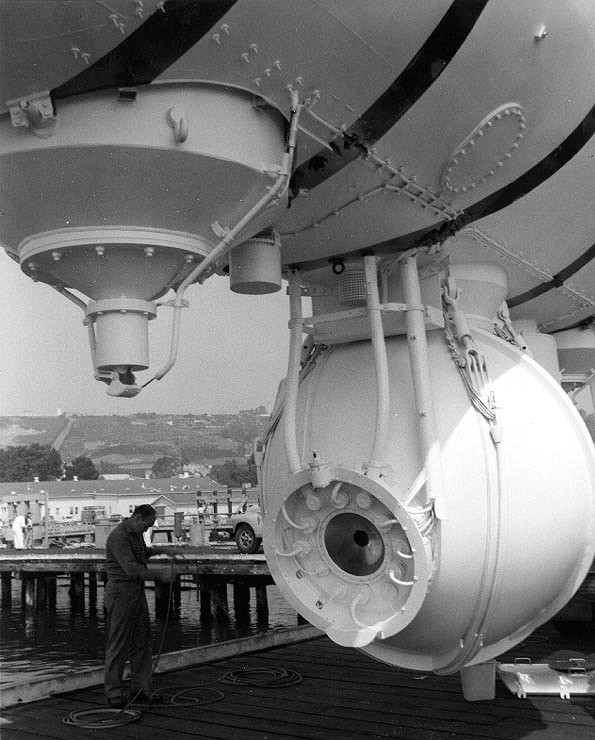
Pressure sphere, with forward ballast hopper, left

The pressure sphere was attached to the underside of the hull and accommodated two crew who accessed it via a vertical shaft through the hull; this access shaft was not pressurized and flooded with seawater on descent. The sphere was completely self-contained, having a closed-circuit rebreather system with oxygen provided from cylinders while carbon dioxide was scrubbed from the air by being passed through canisters of soda-lime. Batteries provided electrical power. Piccard's original pressure sphere was built by Terni società per l'industria e l'elettricità spa of Terni/Italy, of steel forged in two hemispheres and joined to form a sphere 2.4 metres (7.9 ft) in diameter and 89 millimetres (3.5 in) thick. It was replaced in December 1958 with a sturdier sphere by the Krupp Steel Works of Essen, Germany, forged in three sections; an equatorial ring and two caps, which were finely machined and joined. The instrument rack for the sphere made by Krupp was separately manufactured by the Ateliers de Constructions Mécaniques de Vevey and subsequently brought to Germany to be integrated into the sphere. The new sphere was also steel, but smaller at 2.16 metres (7.1 ft) diameter and with thicker walls, at 127 millimetres (5.0 in), calculated to withstand the 1,250 kilograms per square centimetre (123 MPa) pressure at the bottom of Challenger Deep plus a substantial factor of safety. The new sphere weighed 14.25 metric tons (31,400 pounds) in air and eight metric tons (18,000 pounds) in water giving it an average specific gravity 2.6 times (or 1.6 times greater than) that of seawater (13÷(13−8)). Outside observations by the crew were made through a porthole made from a single, tapered block of acrylic glass; the only transparent material available that could withstand the pressure. Outside illumination was by quartz arc-light bulbs, which could withstand the pressure without modification.

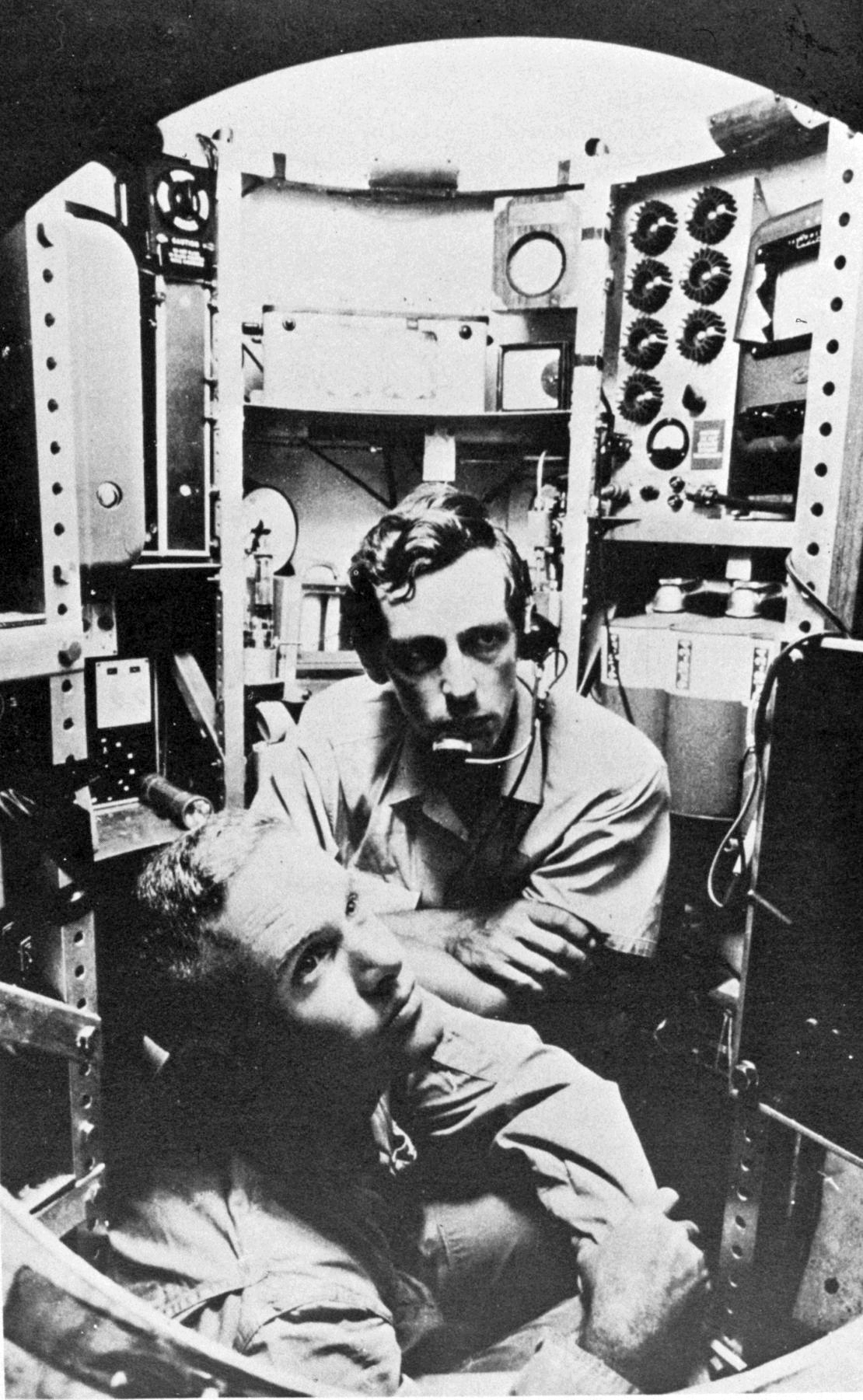
Don Walsh and Jacques Piccard aboard Trieste

The buoyancy tanks were filled with gasoline, which floats in water and is similarly incompressible. Changes in the volume of the gasoline caused by any slight compression or temperature changes were accommodated by the free flow of seawater into and out of the bottom of the tanks during a dive via valves, equalising the pressure and allowing them to be lightly built.
Ballast was held in two conical hoppers fore and aft of the crew sphere each containing 9 metric tons (20,000 pounds) of iron shot. This shot ballast allowed the craft to sink, and its release caused it to ascend. The iron shot was locked in place at the throats of the hoppers by electromagnets thus was released either by switching the electromagnets off or automatically in the event of an electrical failure. Progressive release allowed buoyancy trim. Compressed-air–driven variable-buoyancy pressure vessels typically used in submarines are not feasible at extreme pressure.
Water tanks at each end of the hull were pumped out for flotation, lifting, and towing on the surface and fully flooded to allow sinking.
Following its acquisition by the United States Navy, Trieste was modified extensively by the Naval Electronics Laboratory, San Diego, California, tested in the Pacific Ocean over the next few years, and culminated in a dive to the bottom of Challenger Deep 23 January 1960.

== The Mariana Trench dives ==
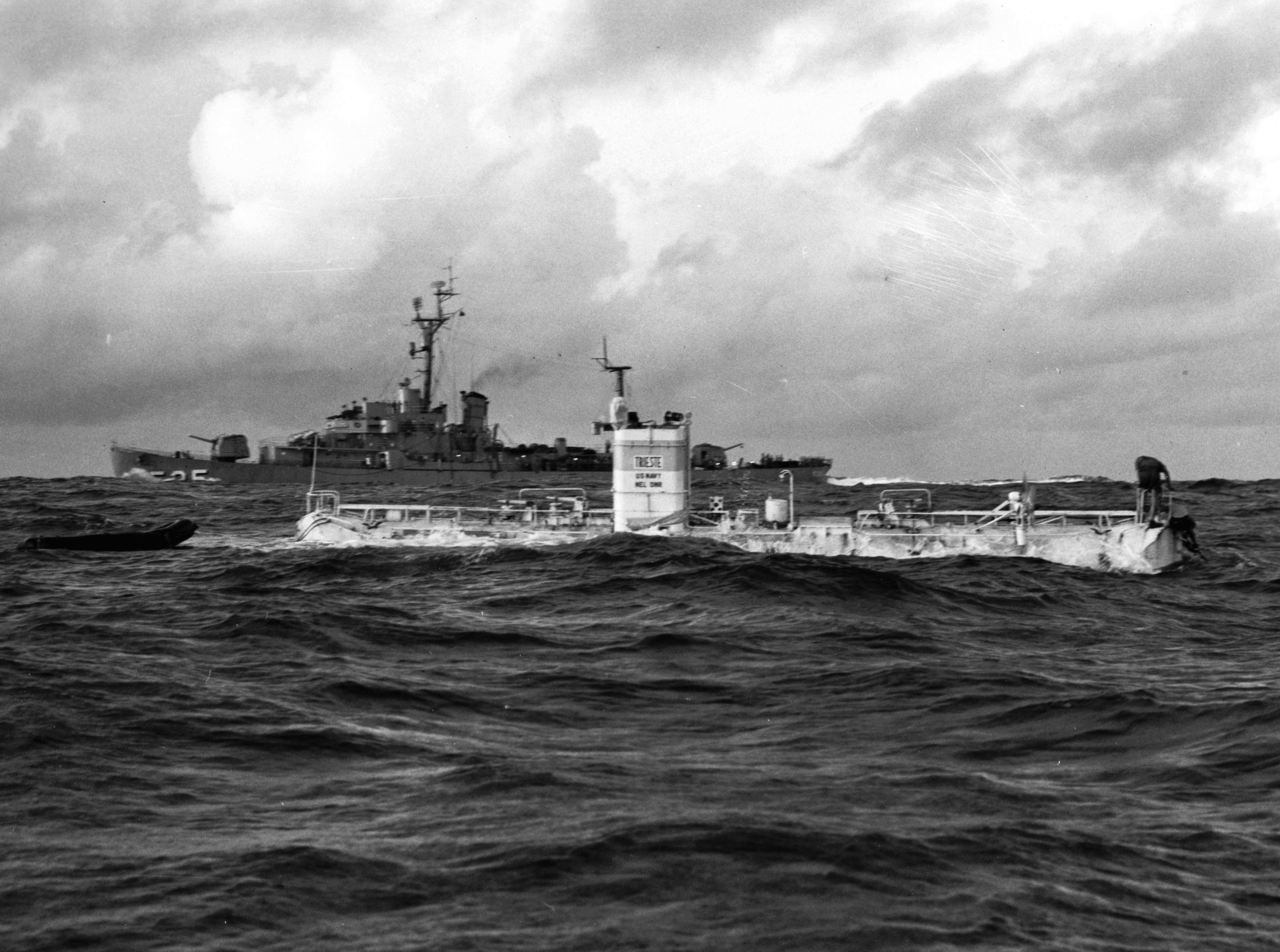
Trieste just before the Mariana dive 23 January 1960, seen escorted by USS Lewis

Trieste departed San Diego on 5 October 1959 for Guam aboard the freighter Santa Maria to participate in Project Nekton, a series of very deep dives in the Mariana Trench.

On 23 January 1960, it reached the ocean floor in the Challenger Deep (the deepest southern part of the Mariana Trench), carrying Jacques Piccard and Don Walsh. This was the first time a vessel, crewed or uncrewed, had reached the deepest known point of the Earth's oceans. The onboard systems indicated a depth of 11,521 metres (37,799 ft), although this was revised later to 10,916 metres (35,814 ft); fairly recently, more accurate measurements have found Challenger Deep to be between 10,911 metres (35,797 ft) and 10,994 metres (36,070 ft) deep.

The descent to the ocean floor took 4 hours 47 minutes at a descent rate of 0.9 metres per second (3.2 km/h; 2.0 mph). After passing 9,000 metres (30,000 ft), one of the outer Plexiglas window panes cracked, shaking the entire vessel. The two men spent twenty minutes on the ocean floor. The temperature in the cabin was 7 °C (45 °F) at the time. While at maximum depth, Piccard and Walsh unexpectedly regained the ability to communicate with the support ship, USS Wandank (ATA-204), using a sonar/hydrophone voice communications system. At a speed of almost 1.6 km/s (1 mi/s) – about five times the speed of sound in air – it took about seven seconds for a voice message to travel from the craft to the support ship and another seven seconds for answers to return.

While at the bottom, Piccard and Walsh reported observing a number of sole and flounder (both flatfish). The accuracy of this observation has later been questioned and recent authorities do not recognize it as valid. The theoretical maximum depth for fish is at about 8,000–8,500 m (26,200–27,900 ft), beyond which they would become hyperosmotic. Invertebrates such as sea cucumbers, some of which potentially could be mistaken for flatfish, have been confirmed at depths of 10,000 m (33,000 ft) and more. Walsh later said that their original observation could be mistaken as their knowledge of biology was limited. Piccard and Walsh noted that the floor of the Challenger Deep consisted of "diatomaceous ooze". The ascent took 3 hours and 15 minutes. The National Museum of the Navy commemorated the 60th anniversary of the dive in January 2020.

== Other deep dives and retirement ==
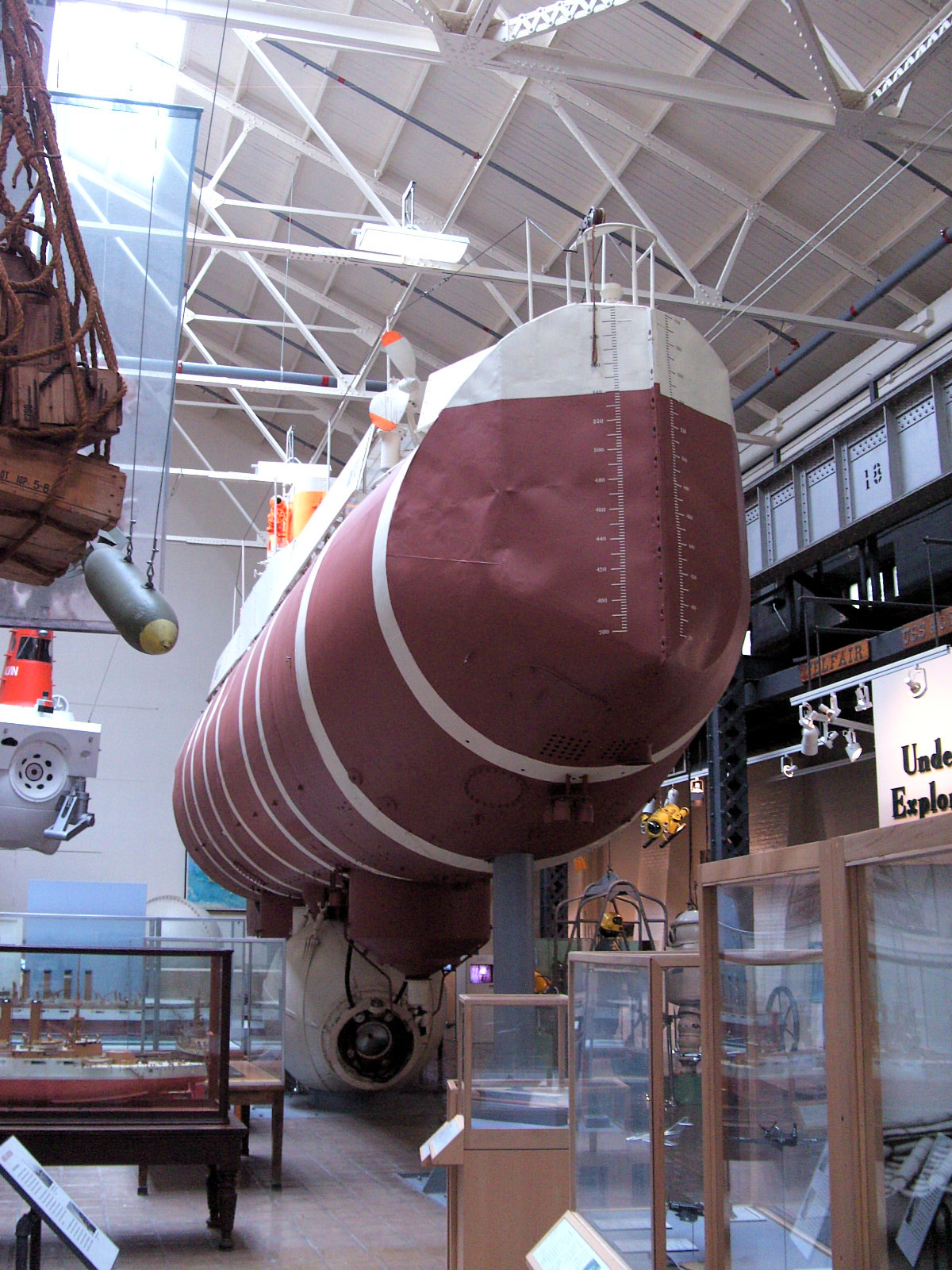
The Trieste at the National Museum of the United States Navy

The Trieste performed a number of deep dives in the Mediterranean prior to being purchased by the U.S. Navy in 1958. It conducted 48 dives exceeding 3,700 metres (12,100 ft) between 1953 and 1957 as the Batiscafo Trieste.

Beginning in April 1963, Trieste was modified and used in the Atlantic Ocean to search for the missing nuclear submarine USS Thresher (SSN-593). Trieste was delivered to Boston Harbor by USS Point Defiance (LSD-31) under the command of Captain H. H. Haisten. In August 1963, Trieste found debris of the wreck off the coast of New England, 2,560 m (8,400 ft) below the surface after several dives. Trieste's participation in the search earned it the Navy Unit Commendation.

Following the mission, Trieste was returned to San Diego and taken out of service in 1966. Between 1964 and 1966, Trieste was used to develop its replacement, the Trieste II, with the original Terni pressure sphere reincorporated in its successor. In early 1980, it was transported to the Washington Navy Yard where it remains on exhibit in the National Museum of the U.S. Navy, along with the Krupp pressure sphere.

== Awards ==
Secretary of the Navy Fred Korth awarded the Trieste for the 1963 Thresher search operation with the Navy Unit Commendation on 8 October 1963.

== See also ==
- Deep Submergence Rescue Vehicle
- Deep Submergence Vehicle
- Alvin (DSV-2)
- Project Mohole
- MIR (submersible)

== Bibliography ==
* Halupca, Enrico (2019). Il Trieste. Trieste: Italo Svevo Edizioni. ISBN 978-8894359435.

- Piccard, Auguste (1956). Earth, Sky and Sea. Oxford University Press.
- Piccard, Piccard; Dietz, Robert S. (1961). Seven Miles Down; The Story of the Bathyscaph Trieste. G. T. Putnam's Sons. OCLC 922278755.
- Polmar, Norman; Mathers, Lee J. (2021). Opening the Great Depths: The Bathyscaph Trieste and Pioneers of Undersea Exploration. Annapolis: Naval Institute Press. ISBN 978-1682475911.
