= HAWAII MR1 =

Seafloor imaging system

The HAWAII MR1 is a seafloor imaging system developed by the Hawaii Mapping Research Group (HMRG) in 1991. HAWAII MR1 is short for HIGP (Hawaiʻi Institute of Geophysics and Planetology) Acoustic Wide Angle Imaging Instrument, Mapping Researcher 1. This system is the first to use all-digital signal processing. It has been used in the discovery of several objects and locations of note, examples being the USS Yorktown and the HMRG Deep.

== Description ==
The MR1 system is relatively small and stable, and is towed at a depth of 80 to 100 meters. Because it is not hull-mounted, this data collection system has the ability to withstand rough conditions.

The HAWAII MR1 also has the capability to measure and collect bathymetric and backscatter data simultaneously, and record raw acoustic data independently of human supervision. After collecting data, the data can be processed with software available from HMRG.

The width of a scan produced by the system varies, depending upon whether it is producing a bathymetry swath or a sidescan swath; the swath while recording bathymetry data is 3.4 times the water depth and the swath while recording sidescan data is 7.5 times the water depth.

== Discoveries ==
The HAWAII MR1 was chosen to be used on an expedition headed by Robert Ballard, the person who discovered the RMS Titanic. The goal of the expedition was to find the USS Yorktown, which they did successfully. Ballard said of the sonar, "It was the [University of Hawaii mapping team's sonar] that enabled us to find it." Bruce Appelgate, at the time director of field operations at HMRG, noted that they were fortunate in finding the ship, as it was at the very edge of the MR1's resolution. The ship was 17,000 feet (5.2 km) underwater.

The mapping system was also used in the discovery of the HMRG Deep, the second deepest spot in the world (after the Challenger Deep).
