= Mariana Trench =

Deepest oceanic trench on Earth

- Location within Earth
- Interactive map of Mariana Trench
- Coordinates: 11°21′N 142°12′E
- Type: Oceanic trench
- Ocean/sea sources: Pacific Ocean
- Max. length: 2,550 km (1,580 mi)
- Max. width: 69 km (43 mi)
- Max. depth: 10,935 ± 6 meters (35,876 ± 20 ft; 5,979.3 ± 3.3 fathoms; 6.7947 ± 0.0037 mi) (Challenger Deep)

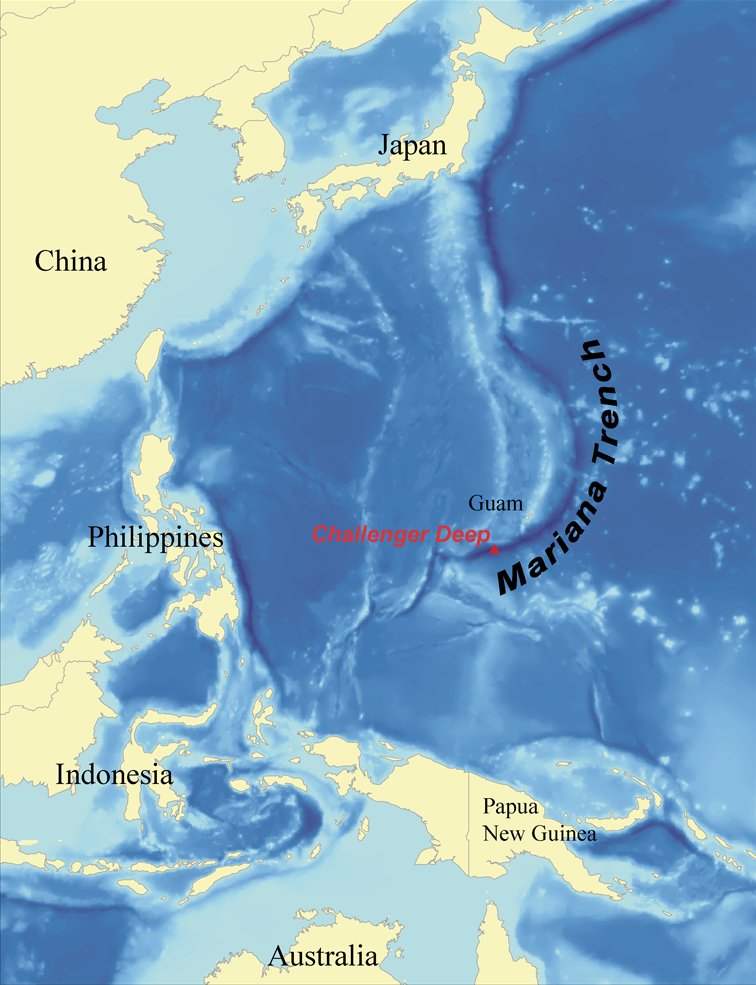
Location of the Mariana Trench

The Mariana Trench is the deepest oceanic trench on Earth, located in the western Pacific Ocean, about 200 kilometers (124 mi) east of the Mariana Islands. It is crescent-shaped and measures about 2,550 km (1,580 mi) in length and 69 km (43 mi) in width. The maximum known depth is 10,935 ± 6 meters (35,876 ± 20 ft; 5,979.3 ± 3.3 fathoms; 6.7947 ± 0.0037 mi) at the southern end of a small slot-shaped valley in its floor known as the Challenger Deep. This makes the deepest point of the trench more than 2 km (1.2 mi) farther from sea level than the peak of Mount Everest. (Note: Mariana Trench is 10,935 m (35,876 ft; 6.795 mi) deep, while Mount Everest is 8,848 m (29,029 ft; 5.498 mi) tall. The difference is 2,087 m (6,847 ft; 1.297 mi), or at least no less than 2,081 m (6,827 ft; 1.293 mi), accounting for the combined 6 m (20 ft; 0.0037 mi) uncertainty in the measurements.)

At the bottom of the trench the water column above exerts a pressure of 111 MPa (16,100 psi), approximately 1,100 times the standard atmospheric pressure at sea level or eight tons per square inch. The temperature at the bottom is 1 to 4 °C (34 to 39 °F).

In 2009, the United States established the Mariana Trench Marine National Monument as national monument from the parts of the Mariana Trench that are inside the exclusive economic zone (EEZ) of the United States. This does not include the Challenger Deep, which lies inside the EEZ of the Federated States of Micronesia.

Single-celled organisms called monothalamea have been found in the trench at a record depth of 10.6 km (35,000 ft; 6.6 mi) below the sea surface by researchers from the Scripps Institution of Oceanography. Data has also suggested that microbial life forms thrive within the trench.

== Etymology ==
The Mariana Trench is named after the nearby Mariana Islands, which are named Las Marianas in honor of Spanish Queen Mariana of Austria. The islands are part of the island arc that is formed on an over-riding plate, called the Mariana plate (also named for the islands), on the western side of the trench.

== Geology ==
The Pacific plate is subducted beneath the Mariana plate, creating the Mariana trench, and (further on) the arc of the Mariana Islands, as water trapped in the plate is released and explodes upward to form island volcanoes and earthquakes.

The Mariana Trench is part of the Izu–Bonin–Mariana subduction system that forms the boundary between two tectonic plates. In this system, the western edge of one plate, the Pacific plate, is subducted (i.e., thrust) beneath the smaller Mariana plate that lies to the west. Crustal material at the western edge of the Pacific plate is some of the oldest oceanic crust on Earth (up to 170 million years old), and is cooler and denser; hence its great height difference relative to the higher-riding (and younger) Mariana plate. The deepest area at the plate boundary is the Mariana Trench proper.

The movement of the Pacific and Mariana plates is also indirectly responsible for the formation of the Mariana Islands. These volcanic islands are caused by flux melting of the upper mantle due to the release of water that is trapped in minerals of the subducted portion of the Pacific plate.

== Research history ==
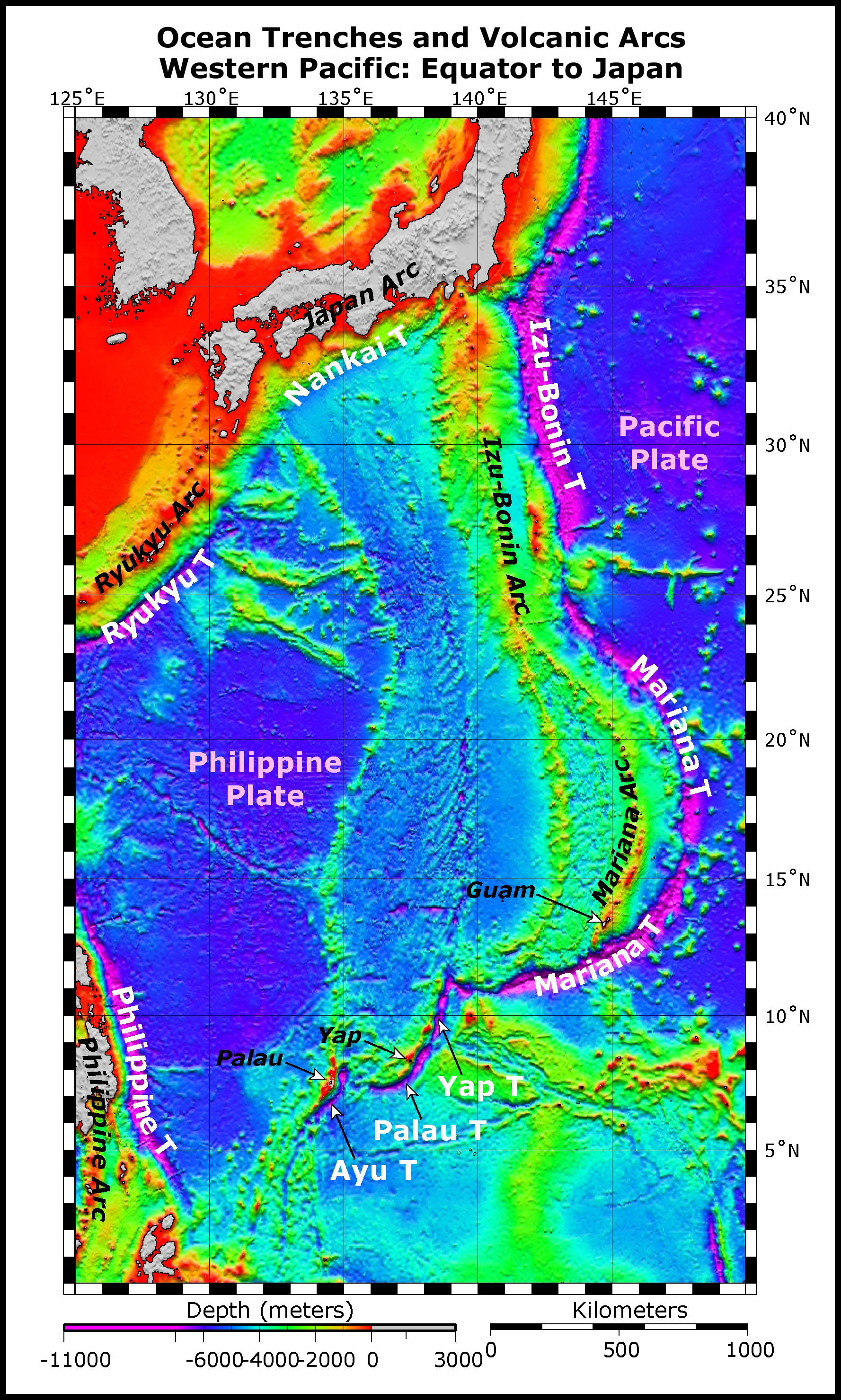
Ocean trenches in the western Pacific

The trench was first discovered during routine depth sounding of the region during the Challenger expedition in 1875 using a weighted rope, which recorded a depth of 4,475 fathoms (8,184 meters; 26,850 feet). In 1877, a map was published called Tiefenkarte des Grossen Ozeans ("Depth map of the Great Ocean") by Petermann, which showed a Challenger Tief ("Challenger deep") at the location of that sounding. In 1899, USS Nero, a converted collier, recorded a depth of 5,269 fathoms (9,636 meters; 31,614 feet).

In 1951, under Chief Scientist Thomas Gaskell, Challenger II surveyed the trench using echo sounding, a much more precise and vastly easier way to measure depth than the sounding equipment and drag lines used in the original expedition. During this survey, the deepest part of the trench was recorded when the Challenger II measured a depth of 5,960 fathoms (10,900 meters; 35,760 feet) at 11°19′N 142°15′E, known as the Challenger Deep.

In 1957, the Soviet vessel Vityaz reported a depth of 11,034 m (36,201 ft; 6,033 fathoms) at a location dubbed the Mariana Hollow.

In 1984, the Japanese survey vessel Takuyō (拓洋) collected data from the Mariana Trench using a narrow, multi-beam echo sounder; it reported a maximum depth of 10,924 meters (35,840 ft), also reported as 10,920 ± 10 m (35,827 ± 33 ft; 5,971.1 ± 5.5 fathoms). Remotely Operated Vehicle KAIKO reached the deepest area of the Mariana Trench and made the deepest diving record of 10,911 m (35,797 ft; 5,966 fathoms) on 24 March 1995.

During surveys carried out between 1997 and 2001, a spot was found along the Mariana Trench that had a depth similar to the Challenger Deep, possibly even deeper. It was discovered while scientists from the Hawaii Institute of Geophysics and Planetology were completing a survey around Guam; they used a sonar mapping system towed behind the research ship to conduct the survey. This new spot was named the HMRG (Hawaii Mapping Research Group) Deep, after the group of scientists who discovered it.

On 1 June 2009, mapping aboard the RV Kilo Moana (mothership of the Nereus vehicle), indicated a spot with a depth of 10,971 m (35,994 ft; 5,999 fathoms). The sonar mapping of the Challenger Deep was possible by its Simrad EM120 sonar multibeam bathymetry system for deep water. The sonar system uses phase and amplitude bottom detection, with an accuracy of better than 0.2% of water depth across the entire swath (implying that the depth figure is accurate to ± 22 meters (72 ft; 12 fathoms)).

In 2011, it was announced at the American Geophysical Union Fall Meeting that a US Navy hydrographic ship equipped with a multibeam echosounder conducted a survey which mapped the entire trench to 100 m (330 ft; 55 fathoms) resolution. The mapping revealed the existence of four rocky outcrops thought to be former seamounts.

The Mariana Trench was a site chosen by researchers at Washington University in St. Louis and the Woods Hole Oceanographic Institution in 2012 for a seismic survey to investigate the subsurface water cycle. Using both ocean-bottom seismometers and hydrophones, the scientists were able to map structures as deep as 97 kilometers (318,000 ft; 53,000 fathoms; 60 miles) beneath the surface.

=== Descents ===
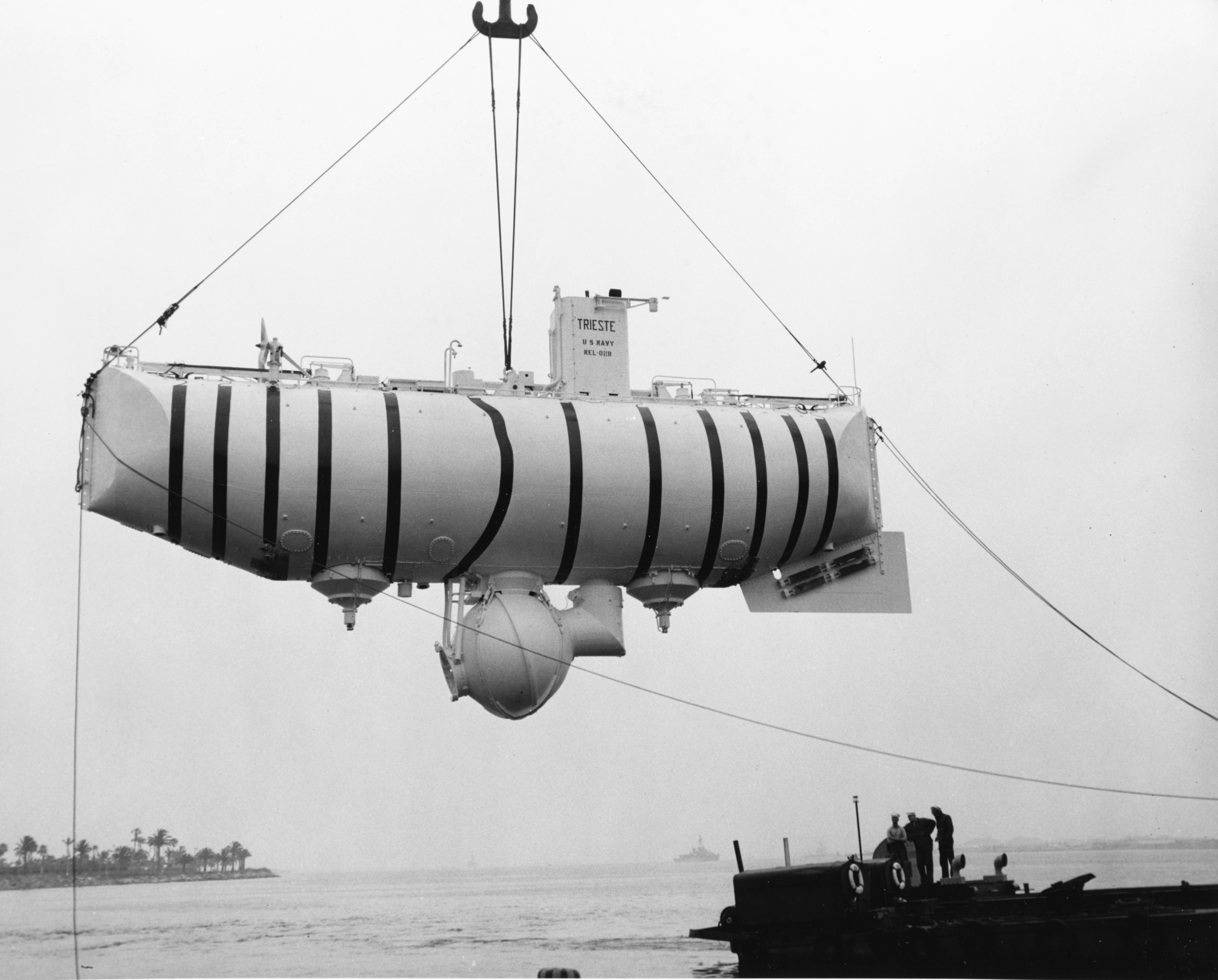
The bathyscaphe Trieste (designed by Auguste Piccard), the first crewed vehicle to reach the bottom of the Mariana Trench

As of 2022, 22 crewed descents and seven uncrewed descents have been achieved. The first was the crewed descent by Swiss-designed, Italian-built, United States Navy-owned bathyscaphe Trieste, which reached the bottom at 1:06 pm on 23 January 1960, with Don Walsh and Jacques Piccard on board. Iron shot was used for ballast, with gasoline for buoyancy. The onboard systems indicated a depth of 37,800 feet (11,521 m; 6,300 fathoms), but this was later revised to 35,814 feet (10,916 m; 5,969 fathoms). The depth was estimated from a conversion of pressure measured and calculations based on the water density from sea surface to seabed.

This was followed by the uncrewed ROVs Kaikō in 1996 and Nereus in 2009. The first three expeditions directly measured very similar depths of 10,902 to 10,916 m (35,768 to 35,814 ft; 5,961 to 5,969 fathoms). The fourth was made by Canadian film director James Cameron on 26 March 2012. He reached the bottom of the Mariana Trench in the submersible vessel Deepsea Challenger, diving to a depth of 10,908 m (35,787 ft; 5,965 fathoms).

In July 2015, members of the National Oceanic and Atmospheric Administration, Oregon State University, and the Coast Guard submerged a hydrophone into the deepest part of the Mariana Trench, the Challenger Deep, never having previously deployed one past a mile. The titanium-shelled hydrophone was designed to withstand the immense pressure 7 miles (37,000 ft; 6,200 fathoms; 11,000 m) under. Although researchers were unable to retrieve the hydrophone until November, the data capacity was full within the first 23 days. After months of analyzing the sounds, the experts were surprised to pick up natural sounds like earthquakes, typhoons, baleen whales, and machine-made sounds such as boats.

Victor Vescovo achieved a new record descent to 10,928 m (35,853 ft; 5,976 fathoms) on 28 April 2019 using the DSV Limiting Factor, a Triton 36000/2 model manufactured by Florida-based Triton Submarines. He dived four times between 28 April and 5 May 2019, becoming the first person to dive into the Challenger Deep more than once. It was then reported on 13 May. In June 2020 he again descended to depths of around 10,935 meters (35,876 ft; 5,979 fathoms). In July 2022, Limiting Factor piloted by Victor Vesco brought Dawn Wright to become the first Black woman to explore the Mariana Trench. Wright acted as mission specialist and employed the side-scan sonar system to map the Western Pool. This endeavor was funded by Caladan Oceanic, a private undersea technology company. Notably, a beer bottle was observed in this area of Challenger Deep.

On 8 May 2020, a joint project between the Russian shipbuilders, scientific teams of the Russian Academy of Sciences with the support of the Russian Foundation for Advanced Research Projects and the Pacific Fleet submerged the autonomous underwater vehicle Vityaz-D to near the bottom of the Mariana Trench at a depth of 10,028 m (32,900 ft; 5,483 fathoms). Vityaz-D is the first underwater vehicle to operate autonomously at the extreme depths of the Mariana Trench. The duration of the mission, excluding diving and surfacing, was more than 3 hours.

On 10 November 2020, the Chinese submersible Fendouzhe reached the bottom of the Mariana Trench at a depth of 10,909 m (35,791 ft; 5,965 fathoms). It returned to the Mariana Trench in 2024, diving 23 times into the depths. Thousands of marine tubeworms and mollusks were reported at depths of 8,200 feet (2,500 m) to 31,000 feet (9,400 m).

== Life ==
The bathyscaphe Trieste expedition conducted in 1960 claimed to have observed, with great surprise because of the high pressure, large creatures living at the bottom, such as a flatfish about 30 cm (12 in) long, and shrimp. According to Piccard, "The bottom appeared light and clear, a waste of firm diatomaceous ooze". Many marine biologists are now skeptical of the supposed sighting of the flatfish, and it is suggested that the creature may instead have been a sea cucumber. During the second expedition in 1996, the uncrewed vehicle Kaikō collected mud samples from the seabed. Microbes including bacteria and fungi were found to be living in those samples.

In July 2011, a research expedition deployed untethered landers, called drop cams, equipped with digital video cameras and lights to explore this deep-sea region. Among many other living organisms, some gigantic single-celled foraminiferans called xenophyophores with a size of more than 10 cm (4 in), belonging to the class of monothalamea, were observed. Xenophyophores, the largest known cells, can withstand high levels of heavy metals. Using these drop cams, jellyfish and other organisms were observed. Monothalamea are noteworthy for their size, their extreme abundance on the seafloor, and their role as hosts for a variety of organisms.

In December 2014, a new species of snailfish was discovered at a depth of 8,145 m (26,722 ft; 4,454 fathoms), breaking the previous record for the deepest living fish seen on video.

During the 2014 expedition, several new species were filmed, including huge amphipods known as supergiants. Deep-sea gigantism is the process where species grow larger than their shallow-water relatives.

In May 2017, the newly named Mariana snailfish from 2014 was filmed at a depth of 8,178 meters (26,800 ft).

Three papers published in Cell in 2025 extensively describe life in the hadal zone, between 6,000 and 11, 000 meters. One of these studies identified more than 7000 new microbial species in the Mariana Trench, 89% of them new to science.

=== Pollution ===
In 2016, a research expedition looked at the chemical makeup of crustacean scavengers collected from the range of 7,841–10,250 m (25,725–33,629 ft; 4,288–5,605 fathoms) within the trench. Within these organisms, the researchers found extremely elevated concentrations of PCBs, a chemical toxin banned in the 1970s for its environmental harm, concentrated at all depths within the sediment of the trench. Further research has found that amphipods also ingest microplastics, with 100% of amphipods having at least one piece of synthetic material in their stomachs.

In 2019, Victor Vescovo reported finding a plastic bag and candy wrappers at the bottom of the trench. That year, Scientific American also reported that high levels of carbon-14 stemming from nuclear bomb testing has been found in the bodies of aquatic animals found in the trench. In 2024, a beer bottle was observed in the Western Pool.

== Possible nuclear waste disposal site ==
Like other oceanic trenches, the Mariana Trench has been proposed as a site for nuclear waste disposal in the hope that tectonic plate subduction occurring at the site might eventually push the nuclear waste deep into the Earth's mantle, the second layer of the Earth. In 1979 Japan planned to dump low-level nuclear wastes near Maug, in the Northern Marianas. However, ocean dumping of nuclear waste is prohibited by international law. Furthermore, plate subduction zones are associated with very large megathrust earthquakes, the effects of which are unpredictable for the safety of long-term disposal of nuclear wastes within the hadopelagic ecosystem.

== See also ==
- Mariana Trench Marine National Monument, United States national monument at the trench. This National Monument protects 246,610 square kilometers (95,216 mi^{2}) of submerged lands and waters of the Mariana Archipelago. It includes some of the Mariana Trench, but not the deepest part, the Challenger Deep, which lies just outside the monument area.
- List of people who descended to Challenger Deep
- Litke Deep, closest point to Earth's center
