= Alan Jamieson =

British marine biologist, engineer, explorer and author

Alan Jamieson OBE
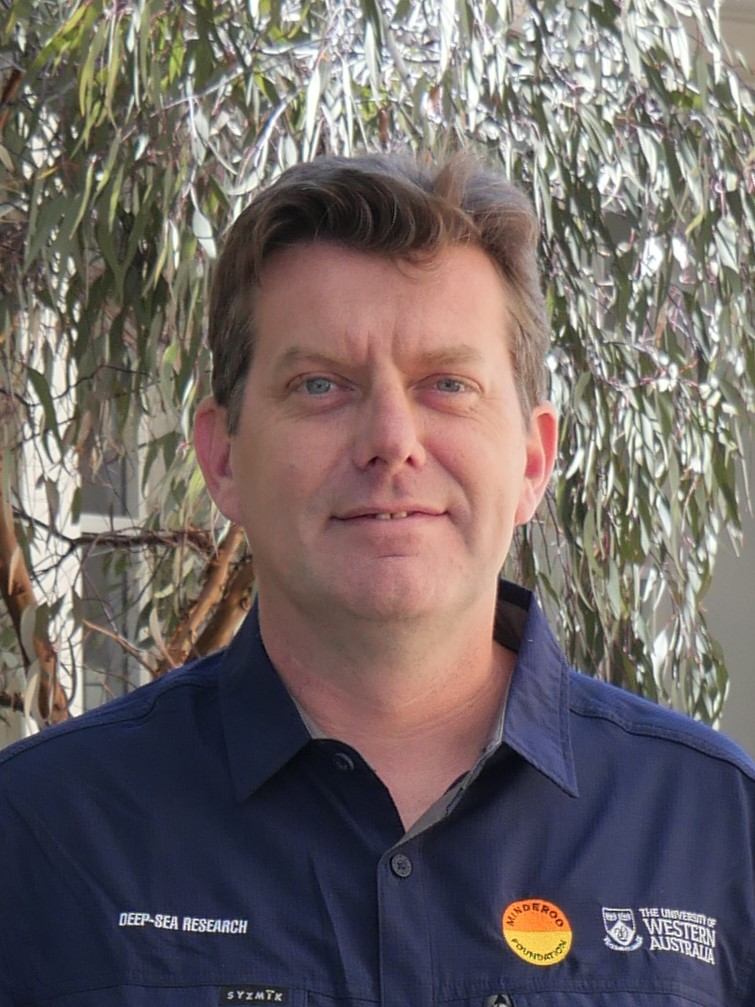
- Jamieson in 2022
- Born: Scotland
- Education: Zoology, PhD, University of Aberdeen
- Occupations: Professor at University of Western Australia, Founding Director at Minderoo-UWA Deep-Sea Research Centre

Alan John Jamieson OBE is a Scottish marine biologist, engineer, explorer and author, best known for his deep-sea exploration and study of life at the deepest places in the oceans. He is known for extensive use of deep-sea landers to establish the maximum depth and community dynamics of many organismal groups, as well as the discovery of many new species and highlighting the presence of anthropogenic impacts at full ocean depth. During the Five Deeps Expedition, and follow on expeditions in 2020, he completed various dives in a crewed submersible to some of the deepest places in the world. He has published over 100 scientific papers and participated in 65 deep-sea expeditions.

== Education and career ==
Jamieson was born in Scotland and grew up in Largs in Ayrshire, and then Longniddry in East Lothian. He attended Preston Lodge High School in Prestonpans. From 1995 to 1999, he obtained a BSc Honours degree in Design for Industry at Robert Gordon University's Gray's School of Art in Aberdeen. In 2000 he joined the newly formed Oceanlab at the University of Aberdeen as mechanical technician where he also completed a part time PhD entitled Autonomous lander technology for biological research at mid-water, abyssal and hadal depths, graduating in 2004. During his time in Aberdeen he worked, studied and published under Professor Imants Priede. Following two postdoc positions he became a lecturer and then senior lecturer at the University of Aberdeen, based at the Oceanlab field station in Newburgh. In 2016 he joined the School of Marine Science and Technology at Newcastle University. In 2019 he founded the company Armatus Oceanic, focused in marine technology R&D, expeditions and science dissemination. Through Armatus Oceanic, he co-runs the Deep Sea Podcast with Dr Thomas Linley. In April 2021 he joined the University of Western Australia as professor and founding director of the Deep-Sea Research Centre.

Jamieson was appointed Officer of the Order of the British Empire (OBE) in the 2024 New Year Honours for services to marine biology, subsea engineering and expoloration.

== Scientific impact ==
Jamieson's early scientific work focussed largely on technology-driven studies into deep-sea fish behaviour and pelagic bioluminescence. He completed two EU funded postdocs, the first a sediment dynamics project named COBO (Coastal Ocean Benthic Observatories), that involved the design and construction of a deep-water Sediment Profile Imaging camera (SPI), the second was an astrophysics project named KM3NeT (Cubic Kilometre Neutrino Telescope), where he surveyed deep-water pelagic bioluminescence across potential sites for an underwater neutrino telescope in the Mediterranean.

During his time at Oceanlab, he began a series of projects relating to exploring the hadal zone (depths exceeding 6000m). He designed and constructed two full ocean depth rated landers to carry baited cameras, traps and other sensors to depth of nearly 11,000m. Between 2007 and 2013 he participated in and often led a series of seagoing expeditions that included the first finding of the taxonomic order Decapoda at hadal depths (including the deepest prawn ever found), the first video of fish greater than 6000m, filmed the deepest fish in the southern hemisphere, the deepest fish ever filmed (at the time), the deepest eel ever found, and the first footage and discovery of the 'supergiant amphipod' at hadal depths. These were achieved across a series 11 expeditions spanning the Japan, Izu–Bonin, Mariana, Kermadec, New Hebrides, Tonga and Peru–Chile trenches in collaboration with the University of Tokyo's Atmosphere and Ocean Research Institute (AORI; Japan) and the National Institute for Water and Atmospheric research (NIWA; New Zealand). These expeditions also saw the discovery of a hadal amphipod species later to be named after him: Princaxelia jamiesoni.

In 2014, Jamieson was a co-Principal investigator on the joint US–UK–NZ Hades projects: Hades-K to the Kermadec Trench and Hades-M to the Mariana Trench. The former was the first expedition to use the HROV Nereus to full scientific capacity. The vehicle was lost during this expedition, but by using spare parts and scrap metal, Jamieson constructed a full ocean depth lander, known as the Wee Trap, that days later captured the deepest fish ever caught, Pseudoliparis swirei. On the second expedition, to the Mariana Trench, he set a new record for the deepest fish (the 'Ethereal snailfish' at 8145 metres deep) and the first video footage of the supergiant amphipod, Alicella gigantea.

From 2015 to 2017, Jamieson led the 'PharmaDEEP' expedition to the South Shetland Trench in Antarctica on the Spanish naval ship Hesperides and participated in the Japanese RV Shinyo Maru expedition to the Mariana Trench in 2017, with the Tokyo University of Marine Science and Technology for the Discovery Channel documentary Deep Ocean, Descent into the Mariana Trench, produced by NHK.

Some of his recent papers includes the deepest cephalopod (octopus) and deepest squid ever filmed, description of the DSV Limiting Factor full ocean depth submersible, a review of the deepest places in each ocean, and a contribution to an industrial scheme to eliminate plastic pollution with Andrew Forrest of the Minder Foundation.

A replica of Jamieson's third Hadal-Lander was constructed and used in a sequence in Episode 2 (The Deep) of the documentary Blue Planet II. The Hadal-Lander is seen descending into a CG model of a subduction trench, alongside some footage obtained during Hades-K and Hades-M.

He was a guest presenter at New Scientist Live at the ExCel London centre in September 2017 [n38] where he also joined BBC World Service's Science in Action live panel show with Roland Pease. He presented at Ocean TEDx KingsPark on 1 December 2021, and took the audience into the deepest ocean where few humans who have dived, including 11 km down in the Mariana Trench.

In 2022 he led an expedition to the Diamantina fracture zone in the East Indian Ocean where his team discovered the deepest fish off mainland Australia at a depth of 6177 metres.

His zoological author abbreviation is Jamieson. He has co-authored the description of 12 new species.

=== The Five Deeps Expedition ===
In 2018, undersea explorer Victor Vescovo selected Jamieson to be the Chief Scientist on the Five Deeps Expedition, whose objective was to thoroughly map and visit the deepest point of all five of the world's oceans by the end of September 2019 in a two-person full ocean depth submersible. Jamieson joined the expedition on the DSSV Pressure Drop in July 2018 and oversaw 103 deep-sea lander deployments spanning the Abaco Canyon, offshore Bahamas, Grand Banks, Puerto Rico Trench and the Agulhas Fracture Zone in the Atlantic Ocean, the South Sandwich Trench in the Southern Ocean, the Diamantina fracture zone and Java Trench in the Indian Ocean, the Mariana Trench, San Cristobal Trench, Santa Cruz Trench and Tonga Trench in the Pacific Ocean, and the Molloy Hole in the Arctic Ocean.

During the expedition he descended to a depth of 7180m in the Java Trench, and then to 10,710m in Sirena Deep in the Mariana Trench, 7200m in the Puerto Rico Trench and 2000m in the Arctic with Vescovo. The first of these dives made him the first British citizen to reach hadal depths, and the second of these dives, made him the 8th deepest diving human in history.

Jamieson rejoined the DSSV Pressure Drop in February 2020 for Caladan Phase I Expedition to the wreck site of La Minerve. In March 2020 he was Chief Scientific on the Phase III expedition to the deepest point of the Red Sea (Suakin Trough), where Jamieson and Vescovo successfully explored the Kebrit Brine Pool in the submersible.

=== Ring of Fire Expeditions ===
Between 2020 and 2022, Jamieson remained as Chief scientist of the DSSV Pressure Drop during the Ring of Fire Expeditions. During this time he led an expedition to the Eastern Mariana Trench and the Sui Shin Hole, and participated in the Philippine Trench expedition that found the wreck of the USS Johnston DD-557 which included a dive to over 10,000 m on the location where, in 1951, the Danish Galathea Expedition proved life existed beyond 10,000m deep. In 2021 he led a Minderoo Foundation charter on the DSSV Pressure Drop to the East Indian Ocean where he completed six submersible dives to the Wallaby-Zenith Fracture Zone and Wallaby Cuvier Escarpment between depth of 6600 and 4400 metres. In 2022 he led the DSSV Pressure Drop expedition to the trenches around Japan where he completed the first crewed dive to the Ryukyu Trench at 7322 metres with Victor Vescovo, and 9137 metres deep at the base of the Boso triple junction in the northern Izu-Ogasawara Trench.

=== Notable publications ===
In 2015, Jamieson published a book entitled The Hadal Zone, Life in the Deepest oceans with Cambridge University Press, which was nominated for the Royal Society of Biology Book of the Year award (2015), and endorsed by film director and explorer James Cameron. He wrote the forewords for John Quentin's 2021 Global Watch fiction novels, The Galathea Legacy and the Vernadsky Ultimatum.

Notable publications include a paper entitled Bioaccumulation of persistent organic pollutants in the deepest ocean fauna, published in Nature ecology & evolution, Fishes of the hadal zone including new species, in situ observations and depth records of Liparidae, published in 2016 in the journal Deep Sea Research Part I.

Jamieson was part of the team that led to the discovery of microplastics at full ocean depth, and was involved in a recent campaign with the WWF (Call it plastic) to name a hadal species Eurythenes plasticus.

=== The Deep-Sea Podcast ===
Since 2020, he has co-hosted The Deep-Sea Podcast with Dr Thom Linley of Armatus Oceanic and Captain Don Walsh known from the 1960 Bathyscape Trieste dive to the Mariana Trench. During this time he has interviewed notable guests such as Dr Glenn Singleman, author Susan Casey, UN secretary General Michael Lodge, His Serene Highness Prince Albert II of Monaco, and film director James Cameron, among others. In episode 13, he interviewed Australian submersible pilot Tim Macdonald of Caladan Oceanic at a depth of over 10,000 metres in the Philippine Trench from inside the DSV Limiting Factor.
