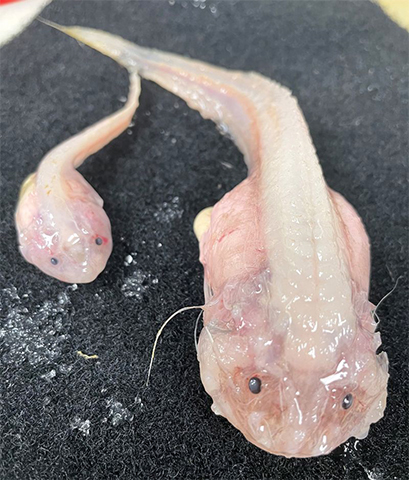

Scientific classification
- Kingdom: Animalia
- Phylum: Chordata
- Class: Actinopterygii
- Order: Perciformes
- Suborder: Cottoidei
- Family: Liparidae
- Genus: Pseudoliparis
- Species: P. belyaevi

Binomial name
- Pseudoliparis belyaevi (Andriashev & Pitruk, 1993)

= Pseudoliparis belyaevi =

Species of fish

Pseudoliparis belyaevi is a species of snailfish found in hadal zone of the Northwest Pacific Ocean, particularly the Japan Trench.

== Geographic range ==
Pseudoliparis belyaevi has been found in the Northwest Pacific Ocean in the Izu-Ogasawara and Japan Trench as deep as 7579 meters in the Japan Trench. This possibly breaks the depth record for a fish collected from the seafloor, previously held by Pseudoliparis swirei at a depth of 7,966 m (26,135 ft). The Liparidae family originated in the North Pacific then made its way to the Southern Ocean and Antarctica, then along the Americas. The waters in these areas is either temperate or cold.

== Habitat ==
There are over 300 species of Snailfish. While many live in shallow waters such as tidepools and river estuaries, some have adapted to the cold water and the high-pressure depths of oceanic trenches at over 7,000 meters deep. In general, the snailfish (notably genus Pseudoliparis) is the most common and dominant family in the hadal zone.

Pseudoliparis belyaevi is a marine and deep-sea species which inhabits depths exceeding 6,000 meters that was described from a single specimen from 6380–7587 meters in the Japan Trench. They are extremely rare and are found to have greatest relative abundance at 7703m. The family Liparidae can occupy depths of 6500-8000m in the Japan Trench, Marianas Trench, and Puerto Rico Trench.

== Physical description ==
Pseudoliparis belyaevi has a slender and elongated body structure, common among snailfish species, and typically displays a pinkish or purplish coloration. The species has a slender and elongated body with a tadpole-shape, typical of snailfish species. The body lacks scales and instead has smooth, gelatinous skin that aids in withstanding the immense pressure of the deep-sea environment. The gelatinous layer has a lower ion concentration than other body fluids to increase buoyancy. In the deep sea, where high hydrostatic pressures make it hard to inflate a swim bladder, having low-density tissues and fluids is an adaptive advantage that appears to be a cost-effective way to increase body size and change shape, providing advantages for swimming efficiency and buoyancy.

Pseudoliparis belyaevi has delicate, well-developed pectoral fins that help it move and stay stable in the deep sea. These fins are crucial for navigating high-pressure, low-light conditions and complex ocean floor terrain. Their pelvic fin is united as a sucking disc in most species with long dorsal and anal fins. This species reaches a length of 10.8 cm (4.3 inches). Their small size is an adaptation that allows them to navigate the narrow crevices and rocky terrain of the deep-sea environment. (Froese and Pauly, 2023) Also, they are found to possess multiple adaptations to survive deep-sea intense pressure, including the pressure-tolerant cartilage, loss of eyesight, and loss of color. In the deep sea, where sunlight cannot penetrate beyond a few hundred meters, there is no need for pigmentation that provide coloration or camouflage as there is no visible light for predators or prey to see. Moreover, in the absence of sunlight, bioluminescence becomes a crucial form of communication, predation, and mating in the deep sea. Being translucent or having minimal pigmentation allows these organisms to better emit and perceive bioluminescent signals without interference from external pigmentation.

== Development ==
There is limited information about Pseudoliparis belyaevi; therefore, the development of this species is little known. In general, snailfish (family Liparidae) have a life cycle that involves both egg and larval stages. Female snailfish release eggs, and the males sometimes guard the eggs. The eggs hatch into larvae and eventually develop into juvenile fish. Over time, they grow into adult snailfish. The growth rate and maturation period of this family vary depending on species and environmental conditions.

== Reproduction ==
There is no specific information for the reproduction of Pseudoliparis belyaevi or the genus Pseudoliparis. However, among the family Liparidae, all species are found to lay eggs with relatively large size and the number of eggs varies due to the species. The large egg size indicates continuous egg laying in hadal snailfish; some species spawn their eggs among cold-water coral, kelp, stones, or xenophyophores, and the males will guard the egg sometimes. Liparids have ventral sucking disk that is used to attach to king crab and deposits its eggs inside the carapace of the gills. Liparid larvae are found at about 1000 m depths and then return to hadal zone to continue growth. In the dark environment of the deep sea, snailfish face challenges in finding and competing for mates. Consequently, they utilize hydrodynamic signals sensed by the mechanosensory lateral line for communication.

== Lifespan/Longevity ==
There is no specific information for the life span of Pseudoliparis belyaevi or the genus Pseudoliparis. However, after the eggs hatch, some species in the family Liparidae rapidly reach the adult size but only live for about one year, while others have life spans up to more than a decade. There is evidence from investigating their morphology that the snailfish have adapted to their extreme environment by having a short life span. Many species inhabit hadal trenches, which are highly turbulent areas with frequent seismic activity and turbidity flows. As a result, they have significantly shorter lifespans compared to species in shallower regions. Age span increases within the Liparidae family depending on species and age estimation is based on the weight and size of otoliths.

== Behavior ==
There's not much information about Pseudoliparis belyaevi behavior but there is information about the genus Careproctus of the Liparid family. We can assume that behavior between the two species can be similar. They would swim "spirally" and discontinuously and even found at the floor bottom. Spiral swimming is also described as scratching which is a technique shallow liparids do to get rid of parasitic copepods.

== Food habits ==
Pseudoliparis belyaevi use suction feeding to consume tiny crustaceans, which are abundant in trenches. In general, the family Liparidae larva feeds on plankton, copepods, and amphipods Snailfish prey vary depends on their size, including gammarid, krill, natantian decapods, crustaceans, fish, and others They have a fast predatory behavior with maximum swimming burst as fast as 17 cm/sec. Moreover, while it is still being studied, snailfish in the northern hemisphere are suggested to show greater starvation tolerance, possibly due to their varying lipid levels (particularly triglycerol and cholesterol). This adaptation allows some species to endure longer periods without food.

== Predation ==
There is no specific information for the predation of Pseudoliparis belyaevi. However, while snailfish in the deep sea do face predation challenges, they have evolved various adaptations to enhance their survival in this extreme environment. Like many other deep-sea organisms, snailfish may uses camouflage to blend into the dark surroundings. Some species of snailfish have a translucent or lightly pigmented appearance, making them less visible to potential predators and prey. Also, some species in the family Liparidae was found using bioluminescence for predator avoidance or prey attraction.

== Ecosystem roles ==
There is limited information available for Pseudoliparis belyaevi and its specific ecological contribution, but there are some potential roles within its ecosystem they may have such as biodiversity support and regulation of the population of small invertebrates.

== Ecosystem importance ==
There is limited information available for Pseudoliparis belyaevi and its specific economic importance. However, due to their adaptation to extreme deep-sea environment, they may benefit from research studying deep-sea ecology, biodiversity, and adaptation to harsh conditions.

== Conservation status ==
Pseudoliparis belyaevi and the family Liparidae in general is categorized as "Data Deficient" on the IUCN Red List of Threatened Species, indicating insufficient information to determine their population status.
