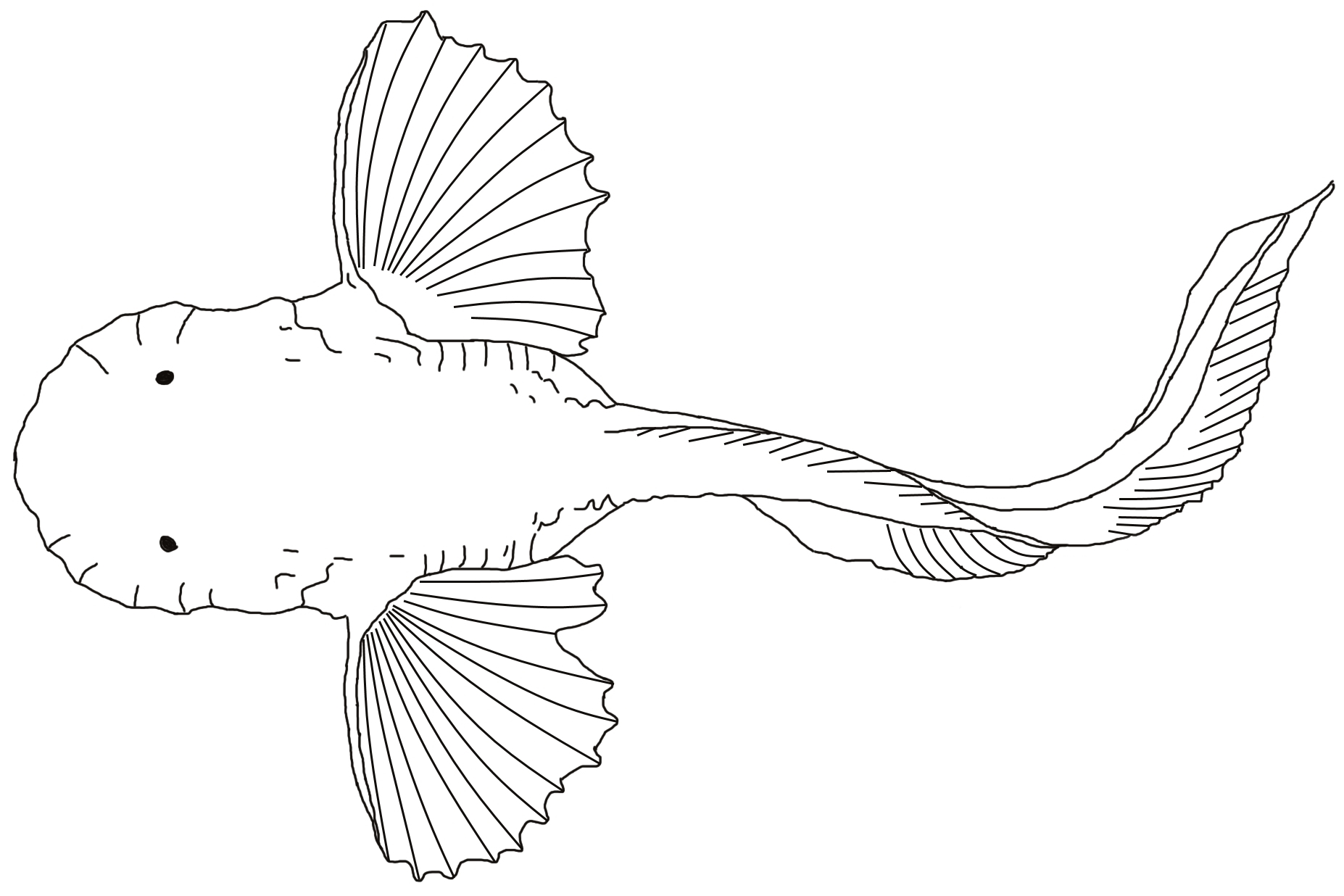
- Line illustration after photograph in Liney et al. (2016)

Scientific classification
- Kingdom: Animalia
- Phylum: Chordata
- Class: Actinopterygii
- Order: Perciformes
- Suborder: Cottoidei
- Family: Liparidae
- Genus: Pseudoliparis
- Species: P. amblystomopsis

Binomial name
- Pseudoliparis amblystomopsis (Andriashev, 1955)

Synonyms
- Careproctus amblystomopsis Andriashev, 1955

= Pseudoliparis amblystomopsis =

Species of fish

Pseudoliparis amblystomopsis, or the hadal snailfish, is a species of snailfish from the hadal zone of the Northwest Pacific Ocean, including the Kuril–Kamchatka and Japan Trenches.

In October 2008, a team from British and Japanese institutes discovered a shoal of Pseudoliparis amblystomopsis at a depth of about 7,700 m (25,300 ft) in the Japan Trench. These were, at the time, the deepest living fish ever recorded on film. The record was surpassed by a type of snailfish filmed at a depth of 8,145 m (26,700 ft) in December 2014, and extended in May 2017 when another snailfish was filmed at a depth of 8,178 m (26,800 ft). This deepest-water so-called ethereal snailfish remains undescribed, but a close relative found only slightly shallower in the Mariana Trench was described as Pseudoliparis swirei in late 2017.
