= Princaxelia jamiesoni =

Scientific classification
- Kingdom: Animalia
- Phylum: Arthropoda
- Class: Malacostraca
- Order: Amphipoda
- Family: Pardaliscidae
- Genus: Princaxelia
- Species: P. jamiesoni

Binomial name
- Princaxelia jamiesoni Lörz, 2010

Species of crustacean

Princaxelia jamiesoni is a species of amphipod crustacean described in 2010. The type material of Princaxelia jamiesoni was collected on September 30, 2008 from a depth of 7,703 metres (25,272 ft) in the Japan Trench (36°14.96′N 142°49.01′E). Further material was collected in 2009 from the Izu–Ogasawara Trench (27°22.09′N 143°13.49′E) at a depth of 9,316 m (30,564 ft). It is named after Alan Jamieson, a marine biologist from the University of Aberdeen.
