= Pseudoliparis =

Pseudoliparis may refer to:

- A genus of orchids, considered synonymous with Malaxis.
- Pseudoliparis, a genus of snailfishes.
