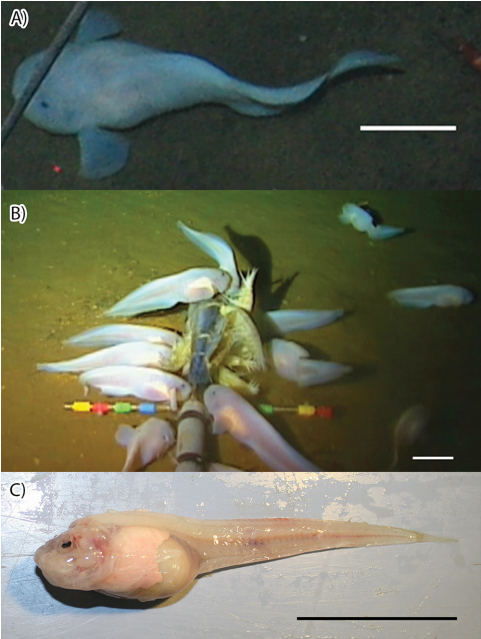
- Pseudoliparis swirei

Scientific classification
- Kingdom: Animalia
- Phylum: Chordata
- Class: Actinopterygii
- Order: Perciformes
- Suborder: Cottoidei
- Family: Liparidae
- Genus: Pseudoliparis; Andriashev, 1955

Type species
- Careproctus (Pseudoliparis) amblystomopsis Andriashev, 1955

= Pseudoliparis (fish) =

Genus of fishes

Pseudoliparis is a genus of snailfishes native to very deep water in the northwestern Pacific Ocean.

== Species ==
There are currently three recognized species in this genus:

- Pseudoliparis amblystomopsis (Andriashev, 1955)
- Pseudoliparis belyaevi Andriashev & Pitruk, 1993
- Pseudoliparis swirei Gerringer & Linley, 2017

== Habitat ==
Pseudoliparis are native to the hadal zone of the ocean. They have been observed swimming at extreme depths of 8,336 metres (27,349 ft; 5.180 mi), in very deep ocean trenches of the Pacific Ocean, including the Izu-Ogasawara Trench and the Mariana Trench.
