= Hadal zone microbial communities =

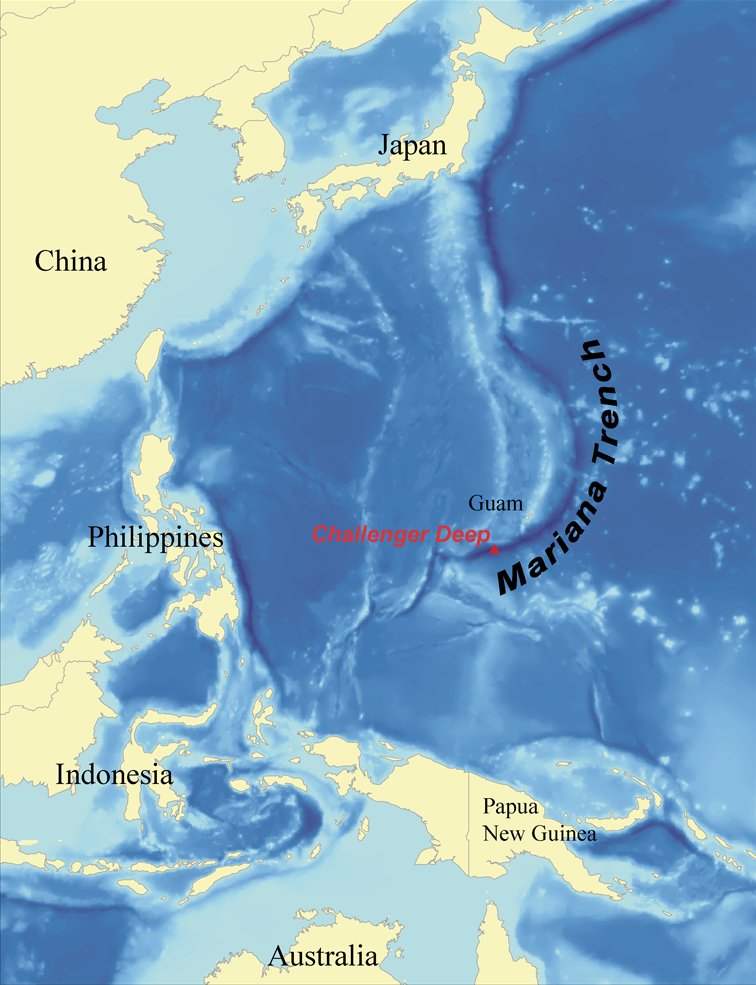
Location of the Mariana Trench: an example of a hadal zone

Hadal zone microbial communities are the groups of microorganisms which reside within hadal zones, which consist of many individual deep oceanic trenches found around the world.

The environmental conditions of the trench environments select for the microbe communities. Generally, the environmental properties of the hadal zone are similar to the abyssal; temperature varies between different trenches, as do salinity and nutrients. A unique characteristic of these hadal zones is the large abundance and accumulation of particulate organic matter in these trenches. These high concentrations correspond directly to high microbial productivity. The physical bathymetry of the trenches is also critical to understandings of microbial communities as this influences the distribution of organic matter. Microbes play a great role in the cycling of this organic matter and other nutrients within the hadal zone.

Hadal zone microbial communities are highly diverse, and include bacteria, archaea as well as viruses. Hadal zone bacterial sediment communities are much more abundant than adjacent abyssal communities thus implicating the importance of distinguishing these two microbial communities. Archaeal microbes also make up a substantial portion of hadal microbial communities and are in fact found to be the most abundant within hadal sediments. Although viral communities have been found to be in a greater amount than nearby abyssal zones, a large proportion of viral genomes are unknown and thus suggest a large gap in viral knowledge within hadal zones.

As the microbial community composition in the hadal zones is incredibly diverse, so is their metabolic potential. The accumulation of organic matter results in the hadal zone being a metabolically rich environment. The most dominant form of metabolism utilized by hadal zone microbes is heterotrophic microbial metabolism. Other forms of dominant metabolism include fermentation, anammox, denitrification, sulfate reductive metabolism, as well as chemolithotrophic pathways such as sulfur oxidation, iron oxidation, nitrification and carbon fixation. Surprisingly, despite the low oxygen conditions, aerobic metabolic potential has also been identified. No phototrophic lifestyles have been found within hadal zone microbes.

With 37 hadal trenches around the globe, the importance of understanding hadal microbial communities and community composition can not be overstated. However, a deep understanding of the microbial ecosystem in the hadal zone still remains largely uncharacterized. It remains one of the least studied and explored microbial habitats due to difficulties with sampling. Exploring the hadal zone and its communities can shed light on the dark biosphere as well as possibly aid scientists in exploring oceans even beyond Earth.

== Environmental properties ==
=== Temperature, salinity, and flows ===
The environmental properties of the hadal zone are similar to those of the deep end of the abyssal zone. Temperature in the hadal zone mostly ranges between 1 and 2.5°C and varies between different trenches. Measurements from the Izu-Ogasawara Trench suggest that the hadal zone has slightly higher salinity and dissolved oxygen than the abyssal zone. Rising pressure with depth causes the in-situ temperature of water in trenches to increase without heat exchange with the surrounding water. Movement of water in hadal trenches is driven by deep water currents, such as the North Pacific Deep Water (NPDW) and Lower Circum-Polar Water (LCPW) currents.

=== Particulate organic matter (POM) ===
Research has found an abundance of particulate organic matter (POM) within various hadal zone environments, such as the Mariana Trench and Atacama Trench. POM has been found both in the water column and sediments of the Mariana Trench. Measurements taken in sediments at the deepest depths of the Mariana Trench show higher amounts of organic carbon than in shallower depths of the abyssal zone.

Additionally, large amounts of organic matter sink down and accumulate in the sediments of the Atacama trench. Sediments here had high amounts of organic carbon and proteins that exceed the amount found in the Abyssal zone sediments. These concentrations were also comparable to coastal areas where productivity is high. Most organic matter deposited in the hadal zone comprises phytoplankton from the surface which sinks down to deeper depths.

Hadal sediments appear to have higher turnover rates of carbon compared to sediments at abyssal depths due to high microbial activity, which is enabled by the large amount of organic matter deposited onto the sediments. POM deposited in the Atacama trench is consumed in microbial activity and mineralization, rendering the Atacama trench a nutrient-dense hadal environment. Additionally, sediments in the hadal zone of the Mariana Trench had higher concentrations of Chlorophyll a and breakdown products than sediments at 6000m depth, suggesting that the deeper sediments may contain organic matter that is of higher quality and more readily accessible to microbes.

Biological oxygen consumption rate was found to be higher in sediments in the hadal zone compared to those at 6000m depth in the Mariana Trench. There is also a higher rate of organic matter diagenesis compared to the abyssal zone. Dark carbon fixation, or chemosynthesis, may also be a source of organic matter for microbes in trenches in the hadal zone.

=== Physical bathymetry and transport ===
The physical bathymetry of trench environments influences how organic matter is distributed. In contrast to the notion that biomass reduces with depth due to remineralisation of organic carbon, biomass production in the hadal zone is supported by abundant organic matter sinking from shallower depths. Trenches are characterised by slopes, which may result in a downward movement of organic material and sediment deposited on the trenches. Downslope movement of material could also be driven by tectonic activity and materials being suspended and redeposited over time.

Downslope transport of sediments influences the distribution of benthic biomass. This was seen in modelling of the Kermadec Trench which showed how biomass is variably distributed across a trench due to the incline and positioning of the trench slopes. Additionally, isotopic carbon composition measurements of organic carbon in hadal zone sediments in the New Britain Trench reveal that organic matter from terrestrial environments within sediments is carried downslope. The surface characteristics of the trench, such as how rugged or flat it is, can also affect the distribution of biomass. Sediments of the Mariana Trench appear to have an uneven and variable profile, suggesting that sediments are frequently deposited and accumulated at the bottom of the hadal zone.

=== Nutrient cycling ===
Studies have found that varying types of microbes are found in different trenches, suggesting that nutrient cycle regimes vary between environments in the hadal zone. The presence of nitrifying microbes has been detected in the transition depths between the abyssal and hadal zone, suggesting that microbes in the sediment may utilize nitrification as a source of energy. Sulfur cycling plays an important role in sulfur reduction and oxidation within the hadal zone, and microbes that facilitate both processes have been discovered in the Mariana Trench. These microbes may also contribute to carbon fixation in hadal zone sediments.

== Distribution ==
Subduction trench formation

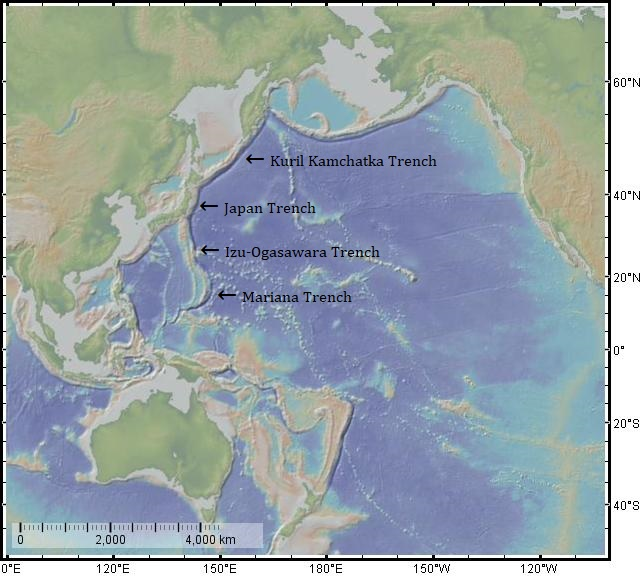
Trench Map

Other geological units may fall into the hadal zone, however, Hadal zones are almost exclusively confined to the 37 hadal trenches. Hadal trenches are thought to have formed from the slow subduction of older, dense lithosphere. This is supported by the distribution of hadal zones, most of which in continent-ocean subduction zones. The most well known hadal trench is the Mariana trench, but there are hadal trenches distributed around the world's oceans.

=== Spatial distribution ===
Microbes that live in the hadal zone are more dependent on recycled organic matter, hypothesised to be due to the trench geomorphology, than their abyssal counterparts that are more dependent on chemolithotrophy. The dependence on organic matter is supported by results that suggest that some combination of hadal currents, rapid burial, and vertical deposition from surface waters drives the organic matter cycle in the hadal zone. The deposition of sediments reflects the overlying ocean's productivity, and is much higher at hadal zones than the abyssal zones due to the input of landslides funnelling into the hadal zone. The organic matter in the hadal zone is more quickly buried than in the abyssal zone, allowing it to avoid oxidative degradation and become available for subsurface microbes. This sedimentation of labile, organic matter is the reason why microbial communities distinct to the hadal zone may be observed globally. These microbial communities have been observed to have different abundances and compositions based on sea surface conditions.

Hadal depths have unique relative phylum abundances even when compared to abyssal depths. It has been found that the hadal depth's prokaryotic SSU rRNA gene communities in the challenger deep are dominated by the bacteria SAR406 and bacteroidetes, and the deepest depths have an increase in gammaproteobacteria, which both contrast with the aphotic waters above that are dominated by SAR11 and thaumarchaeota. In general the abundance of microbes in the hadal zone has been observed to be higher than the abyssal zone, and in the Mariana Trench it was found to increase with depth.

=== Temporal distribution ===
The link between seasonality and microbial abundance and composition in the hadal zone exists when considering the correlation between the overlying ocean's productivity and the sediment deposition in the hadal zone. The locations of hadal trenches, however, suggest that plate tectonics may play a role in the temporal distribution of microbes in the hadal zone. The unpredictable nature of tectonic processes means that the hadal environments that are governed by these processes may also experience unexpected shifts. Influx of sediments due to landslides are linked to earthquakes by nature, while there may be a further link between earthquake frequencies and microbial distribution. The Japan trench was shown to exhibit this link at geological timescales, where historical earthquakes both introduced a distinctive microbial community, and the community structure varied with organic carbon deposition from earthquakes. There is research that suggests that the oldest presence of hadal zone microbes may only date back 1 billion years.

== Community composition ==
The hadal zones of the ocean have distinct but non-unique bacterial communities, being a mixture of both common genera that are found throughout the water column and also highly specialized piezophilic and psychrophilic strains of heterotrophic bacteria. The most common genera in hadal zone bacterial communities is often correlated with the rest of the water column above the trench which makes up the hadal zone, with a smaller fraction of rare bacteria making up the majority of the unique taxa found.

=== Bacteria ===
Hadal zone water column bacterial diversity is notably unique as compared to other ocean locations such as the abyssopelagic zone, with depth being a strong determinant in community composition. Some of the most common bacterial taxa in the hadal aquatic environment are Bacteroidetes, Proteobacteria, Gammaproteobacteria, Deferribacteretes, and Marinimicrobia. Some specific genera that make up a large portion of the hadal bacterial aquatic ecosystem include Roseobacter, Alteromonas, and Aquibacter.

Hadal zone sediments have a remarkably high amount of bacteria as compared to nearby abyssal ecosystems. It is notable that not all species found in the hadal zone are solely adapted to the high pressure and low temperature hadal environment, and can be cultured outside of these conditions. This supports mechanisms of bacterial spread between various hadal micro environments around the ocean. Some of the most common hadal sediment bacteria include Proteobacteria, Planctomycetes, and Bacteroidetes. An area of research that is still in need of more information is bacterial life associated with hadal animals, as few studies have been able to sample and analyze bacteria from locations such as the guts of hadal fish species.

=== Archaea ===
The archaeal taxa Thaumarchaeota, and to a lesser extent Candidatus Woesearchaeota were found to be some of the most common microbes in hadal sediment ecosystems. Archaeal taxa are also found sparingly in the water column but are not as dominant determinant of the communities as compared to heterotrophic bacteria.

=== Viruses ===
The viral microbial community is one of the least studied substituents of the hadal biosphere. Despite this, it is known that viral abundance is proportionally greater than nearby abyssal ecosystems, and a majority of the viral genomes that are sequenced from hadal ecosystems are not known, meaning that the hadal ocean contains a large number of novel viruses.

=== Eukaryotes ===
Most of the small eukaryotic biomass in the hadal zone is composed of nematodes and foraminiferans. The eukaryotes found in this area however have proven difficult to study because of an inability to recover live samples, undersampling of the hadal zone, and low population density.

== Metabolic diversity ==
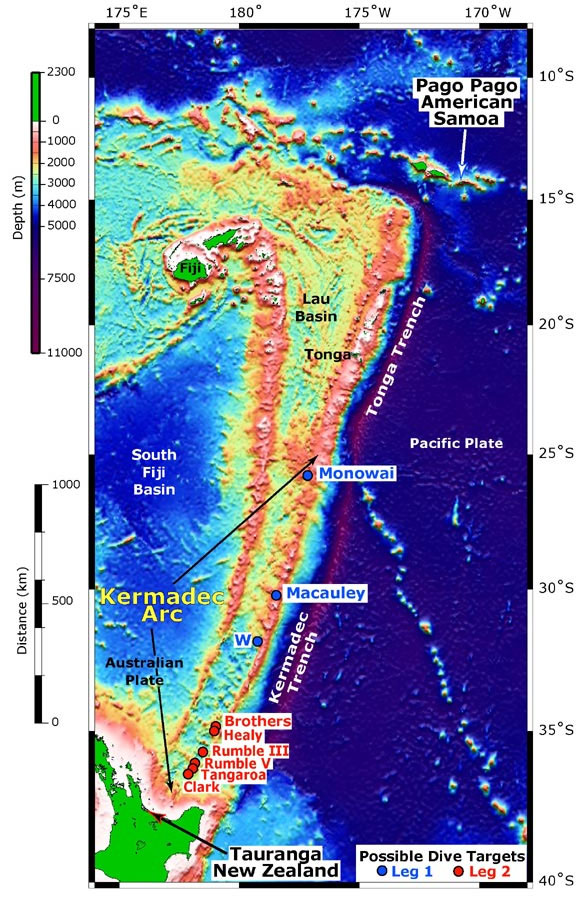
A map depicting the location of Tonga Trench.

Microbial metabolism is the means through which microbes in any given environment obtain energy and nutrients. This encompasses an understanding of substrate oxidation and dissimilation reactions through which bacteria can generate energy as well as facilitate the uptake and release of inorganic or organic compounds. As hadal microbes themselves are incredibly diverse, so are their metabolic potentials. This is also an incredibly metabolically active and even enhanced environment due to the typical V-shape of trenches which are hypothesized to result in Particulate Organic Matter (POM) accumulation. Researchers have even found that oxygen consumption in Mariana Trench and Tonga Trench was one-fold higher than in their respective abyssal plains. This indicates a drastic increase in respiration and therefore metabolic activity.

=== Heterotrophic microbial metabolism ===
As seen by previous studies, the hadal sphere largely hosts a heterotrophic microbial community and a large proportion of these are chemoheterotrophs. These organisms feed on sinking organic matter or organic matter re-suspended from sediments. Some examples commonly seen in the Hadal Zone of Mariana Trench are Erythrobacter, Rhodovulum, Alteromonas, Marinobacter etc. In the Challenger Deep, the large abundance of heterotrophic bacteria has also been linked to the lower Dissolved Organic Carbon (DOC) concentrations due to enhanced biodegradation and respiration. This effect was most prevalent in mid-depth of the hadal zone

=== Fermentation ===
A diagram explaining one of the possible types of fermentation: ethanol fermentation.

Research conducted in the Challenger Deep found microbes with genetic capabilities for fermentation for degradation of organic matter. Key enzymes such as pyruvate reduction enzyme were found along with marker genes for acetate, ethanol and formate fermentation metabolism. Marker genes for acetate metabolism were found most widespread in archaea, such as Thaumarchaeota and Ca. Woesearchaeota, in hadal sediments. Other fermentation marker genes were also present and involved in processes such as anthranilate degradation, thus indicating benzoate as a fermentative metabolite in hadal sediments. The large abundance of the responsible enzyme indicates that the degradation of aromatic compounds is commonly metabolically required by hadal sediment microbes.

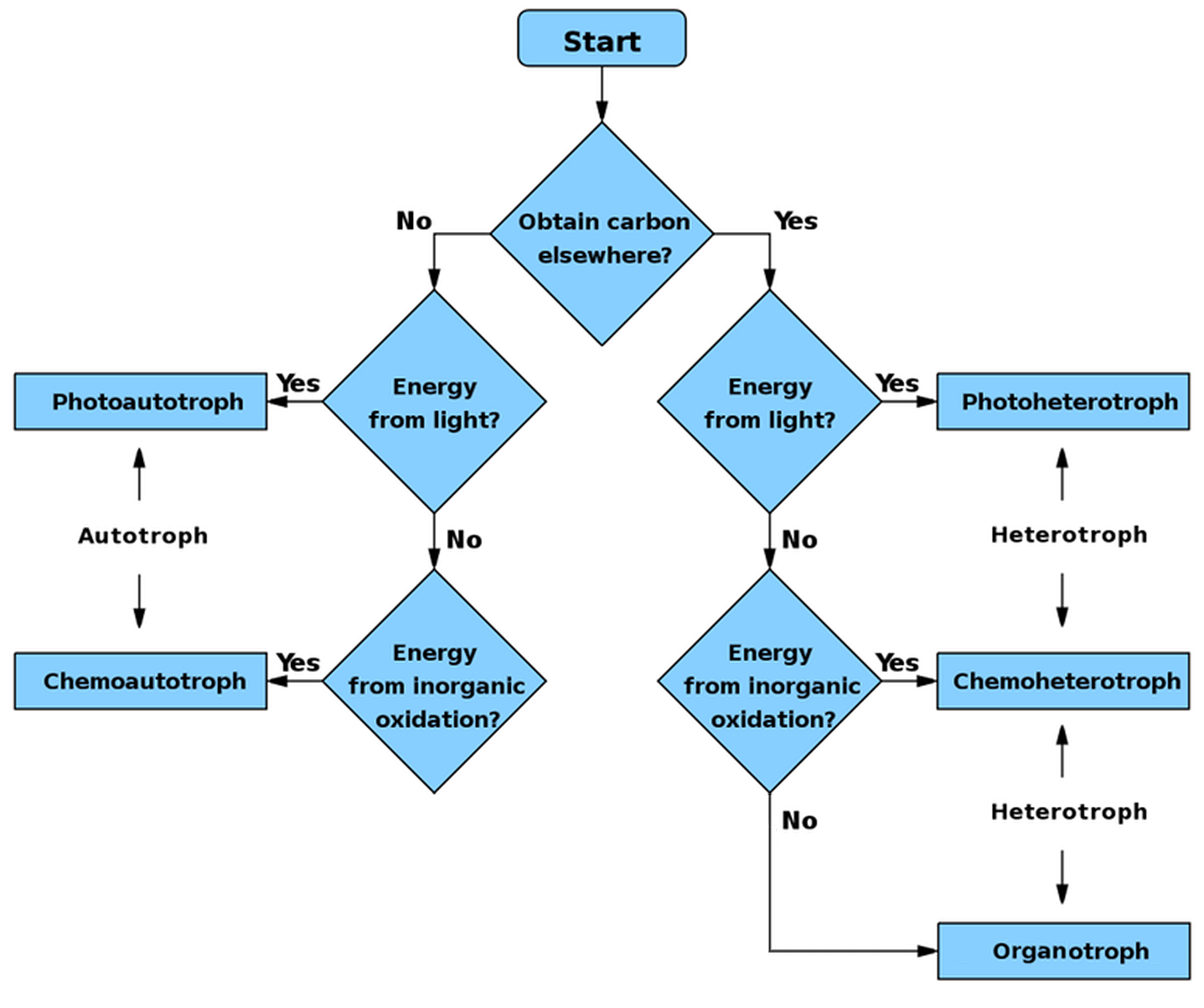
Flowchart showing a brief overview of characterizing metabolism of organisms.

=== Aerobic respiration ===
While hadal zones themselves have little to no oxygen, surprisingly a significant amount of aerobic respiratory genes, such as cytochrome c oxidases, have been found by researchers in the Challenger Deep. These are associated with 24 phyla some of which include Acidobacteria, Bacteroidetes, Gemmatimonadetes, and Proteobacteria. This suggests that a large majority of hadal microbes to possess the genetic tools to potentially use oxygen for energy generation. Furthermore, a significant microbial population is also found to possess facultatively aerobic metabolism.

=== Anaerobic respiration ===
Facultative anaerobic metabolism is one of the most prevalent metabolisms in hadal microbes. These microbes are able to metabolise in both oxic and anoxic conditions.

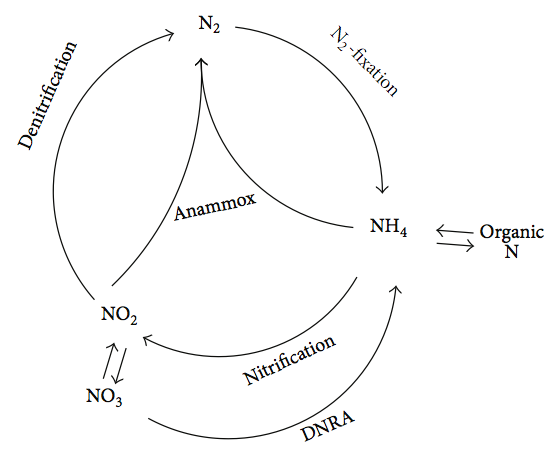
A graphic of the nitrogen cycle outlining processes such as denitrification, anammox and DNRA.

==== Anammox, denitrification, and DNRA ====
Denitrification and anammox are the major N2-producing microbial processes found in hadal sediments, with anammox contributing significantly more. Anammox bacteria found have great diversity. In addition to functional denitrification and anammox genes being identified, research has also been conducted to test them under hydrostatic pressure.

==== Sulfate reduction ====
Assimilatory and dissimilatory sulfate reduction pathways have been identified in hadal microbes. Although these were initially regarded as less significant than denitrification and DNRA, recent research has shown that their large distribution suggests that they are of equal or greater importance.

=== Chemolithotrophy ===
Chemolithotrophs oxidize inorganic compounds to acquire energy. As we enter the hadal zone, chemolithoautotrophs decrease in relative abundance as heterotrophic bacterial abundance increases.

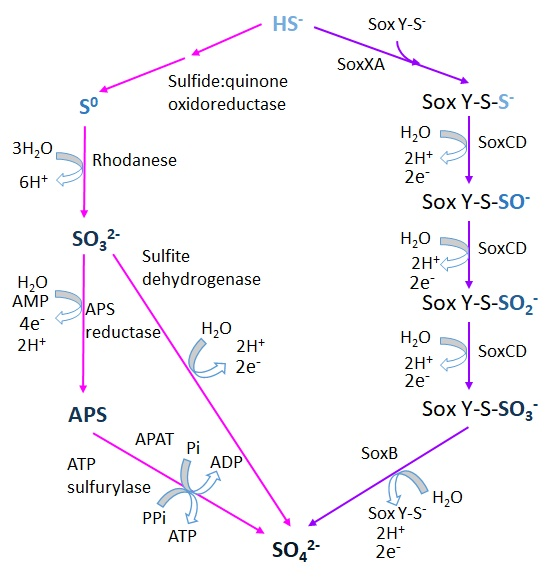
Examples of enzymatic pathways used by sulfur-oxidizing bacteria.

==== Sulfur oxidation ====
Acidobacteria, Actinobacteria, Bacteroidetes, Chloroflexi, Gemmatimonadetes, Planctomycetes, Thaumarchaeota, and Proteobacteria in Challenger Deep sediments have genes encoding sulfide oxidation in a considerable amount. However, this abundance is not high enough to suggest this is a key energy process in this environment. One of the most abundant sulfur oxidizer is Sulfurovum-Sulfurimonas group which is found most prevalently in the Sirena Deep. Another significant example is a type of Thiobacteriaceae.

==== Iron oxidation ====
An iron oxidation gene has been found in a sample of Gemmatimonadetes, showing metabolic potential for use of iron as an electron donor. This suggests that there are possibilities for hadal microbes, although in few numbers, to rely upon iron oxidation as a metabolic pathway.

==== Nitrification ====
Gene markers for nitrification were found in a significant number of samples in a Challenger Deep sediment microbiome study. This notable presence signifies that nitrification is important in terms of energy production for hadal microbes. Interestingly, all but one nitrification genes was found in these hadal microbes. This gene is commonly found in bathypelagic microbes, and thus reaffirms metabolic differences between the two zones.

Graphic showcasing part 1 of the 3-Hydroxypropionate bicycle pathway.

==== Carbon fixation ====
Hadal biosphere researchers have also found metabolic potential for six different carbon fixation pathways in the Challenger Deep sediments. The hydroxypropionate bi-cycle (3-HP) was the most present compared to the Calvin Cycle, Wood-Ljungdahl pathway, the reverse TCA cycle, the 3 hydroxypropionate-4 hydroxybutyrate cycle, and methanogenesis. 3-HP was found in Chloroflexi, Proteobacteria, Nitrospinae, Acidobacteria, Actinobacteria, Calditrichaeota, Ca. Hydrogenedentes, and Gemmatimonadetes.

=== Phototrophy ===
Deep water samples, specifically MGII archaea, have revealed that surface water ecotypes of the same archaea lack proteorhodopsins and thus are unable to support photoheterotrophic lifestyles.

=== Special metabolic properties ===
A cell wall diagram including pectin and hemicellulose showcasing the barriers needed to overcome for degradation by a microbe.

==== Degradation of complex polysaccharides ====
Various research studies have found that hadal bacteria are commonly enriched with genes associated with the breakdown of complex macromolecules. For example, there is a significantly greater abundance of hydrocarbon-degrading bacteria in the Challenger Deep which is the highest proportion observed compared to any other natural environment. This is exemplified by the Bacterioidetes hadal zone population which, relative to other oceanic ecotypes, has significantly enhanced cell wall hemicelluloses and pectin metabolic potential.

==== Methylotrophy ====
Several researchers have also found hadal microbes with genetic capabilities to perform methylotrophy. Genes encoding possible carbon monoxide (CO) oxidation have been found in the Challenger Deep, however, other forms of methylotrophy have yet to be identified in hadal microbes. In one Challenger Deep sediment study, the gene for CO oxidation was found in over half samples, thus signifying it as an important energy source in the hadal zone.

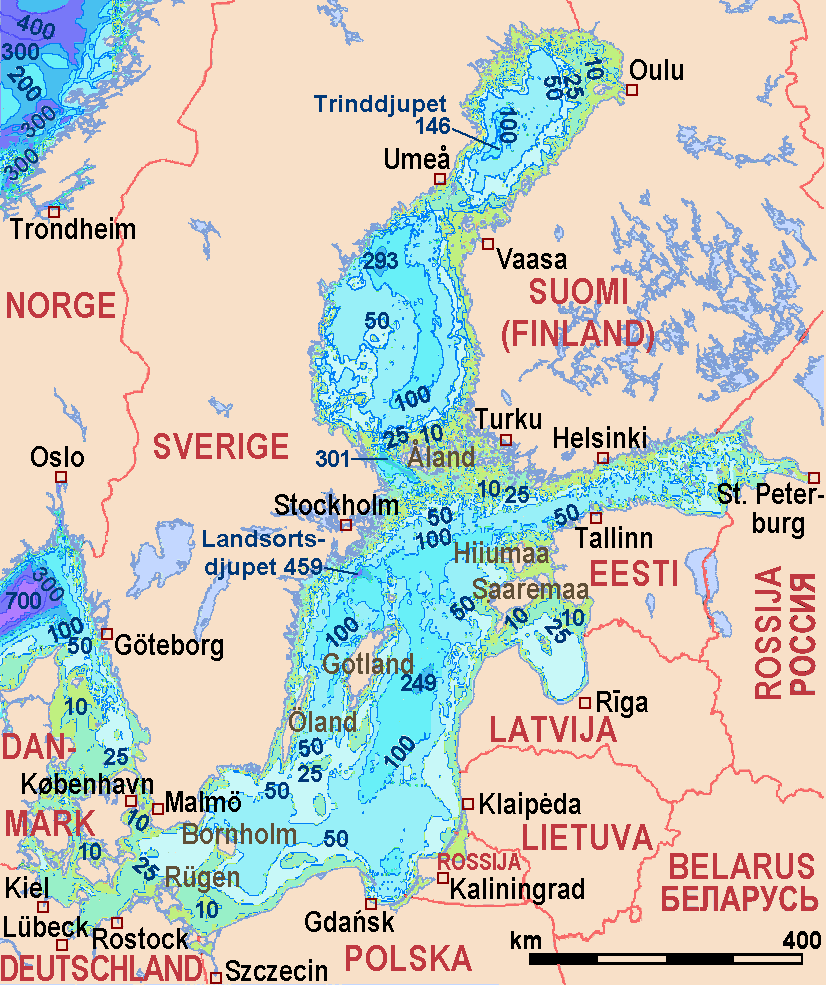
Map with depths of the Baltic Sea depicting Landsort Deep (on map as Landsorts-djupet 450)

==== Syntrophy ====
Although the Baltic Sea is relatively shallow, researchers working on the hypoxic microbial communities of the Landsort Deep reported potential syntrophic relationships between hadal archaeal ammonium oxidizers and bacterial denitrifiers. Furthermore, a co-distribution of sulfur-oxidizing and ammonium oxidizing also suggests possible syntrophy.
