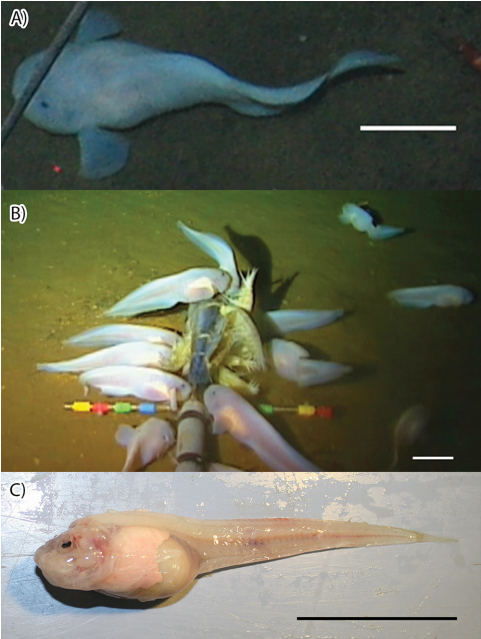
- Photographs A and B were taken in the wild and C was taken after capture

Scientific classification
- Kingdom: Animalia
- Phylum: Chordata
- Class: Actinopterygii
- Division: Teleostei
- Order: Perciformes
- Suborder: Cottoidei
- Family: Liparidae
- Genus: Pseudoliparis
- Species: P. swirei

Binomial name
- Pseudoliparis swirei Gerringer & Linley, 2017

= Pseudoliparis swirei =

Species of snailfish found at hadal depths in the Mariana Trench

Pseudoliparis swirei, the Mariana snailfish or Mariana hadal snailfish, is a species of snailfish found at hadal depths in the Mariana Trench in the western Pacific Ocean. It is known from a depth range of 6,198–8,076 m (20,335–26,496 ft), including a capture at 7,966 m (26,135 ft), which is possibly the record for a fish caught on the seafloor. Various anatomical, physiological, molecular and genetic adaptions help this species survive in such depths.

This pale, tadpole-like fish reaches up to 28.8 cm (11.3 in) in standard length and 160 g (0.35 lb) in weight. It is apparently the top predator along certain stretches of the Mariana Trench, feeding on tiny crustaceans in a deep-water habitat with few larger predators. Pseudoliparis swirei are abundant in their deep-sea habitat and lay relatively large eggs that are almost 1 cm (0.4 in) in diameter.

== Discovery ==
The first specimens of this species were caught in 2014 during an expedition of the research vessel Falkor. To catch the fish, deep-water traps designed to minimize the damage to the caught fish during the ascent were used. Mackerel was used as bait. Findings of hadal fish are limited, as the trawl catch method used for catching causes them to end up in very low quantities and poor condition. The first representative of this species was caught on November 15, 2014. In the next 10 days another 35 were caught. Another was caught on January 29, 2017, during the expedition of the research ship Shinyo-maru. The holotype of the species is the immature specimen USNM 438975 / HADES 200060, caught on November 21, 2014, at a depth of 7,949 m (26,079 ft).

== Depth record and adaptations ==
Abyssobrotula galatheae has generally been recognized as the record-holder based on one caught at the seafloor at 8,370 m (27,460 ft), but it might have been caught with a non-closing net (a net that is open on the way up and down into the deep) and therefore was perhaps shallower. Another contender is Echiodon neotes, captured at 8,200–8,300 m (26,900–27,200 ft), but this was likely from open water (not at the seafloor). Only one other species of fish has been recorded from depths in excess of 8,000 m (26,000 ft), the so-called ethereal snailfish (living in the same region as Pseudoliparis swirei but somewhat deeper), but it has only been seen on film and remain undescribed.

Due to the extreme pressure, 8,000–8,500 m (26,200–27,900 ft) appears to be around the theoretical maximum depth possible for fish.

Compared to shallow-water snailfish, Pseudoliparis swirei has several unusual adaptions for its dark and high pressure habitat, including transparent skin that lacks pigment, certain organs and eggs that are enlarged, the muscles are thinner, the ossification of its bones (notably the skull) is incomplete, it appears to have little or no ability to see, there are mechanisms that allow proteins in its body to still function, and differences in the cell membranes for maintaining their flexibility.

== Etymology ==
Pseudoliparis swirei is named for Herbert Swire, the First Navigating Sub-Lieutenant of HMS Challenger and author of The Voyage of the Challenger, a personal narrative of the historic circumnavigation of the globe in the years 1872-1876. In 1876 the expedition found the Challenger Deep, habitat of the Mariana snailfish.

== Reproduction ==
A study of females showed that mature eggs are unusually large, up to 9.4 mm (0.37 in) in diameter. In total, there were up to 23 mature eggs for each female (each larger than 5 mm or 0.20 in in diameter), which were alternated with immature, small eggs, the number of which was about 850. Eggs of intermediate size were rarely seen. Even in the largest eggs, no structures were found that indicate the development of the embryo within the eggs. There are indications that the larvae of P. swirei and at least some other hadal fish spend time in the open water at relatively shallow depths, less than 1,000 m (3,300 ft).
