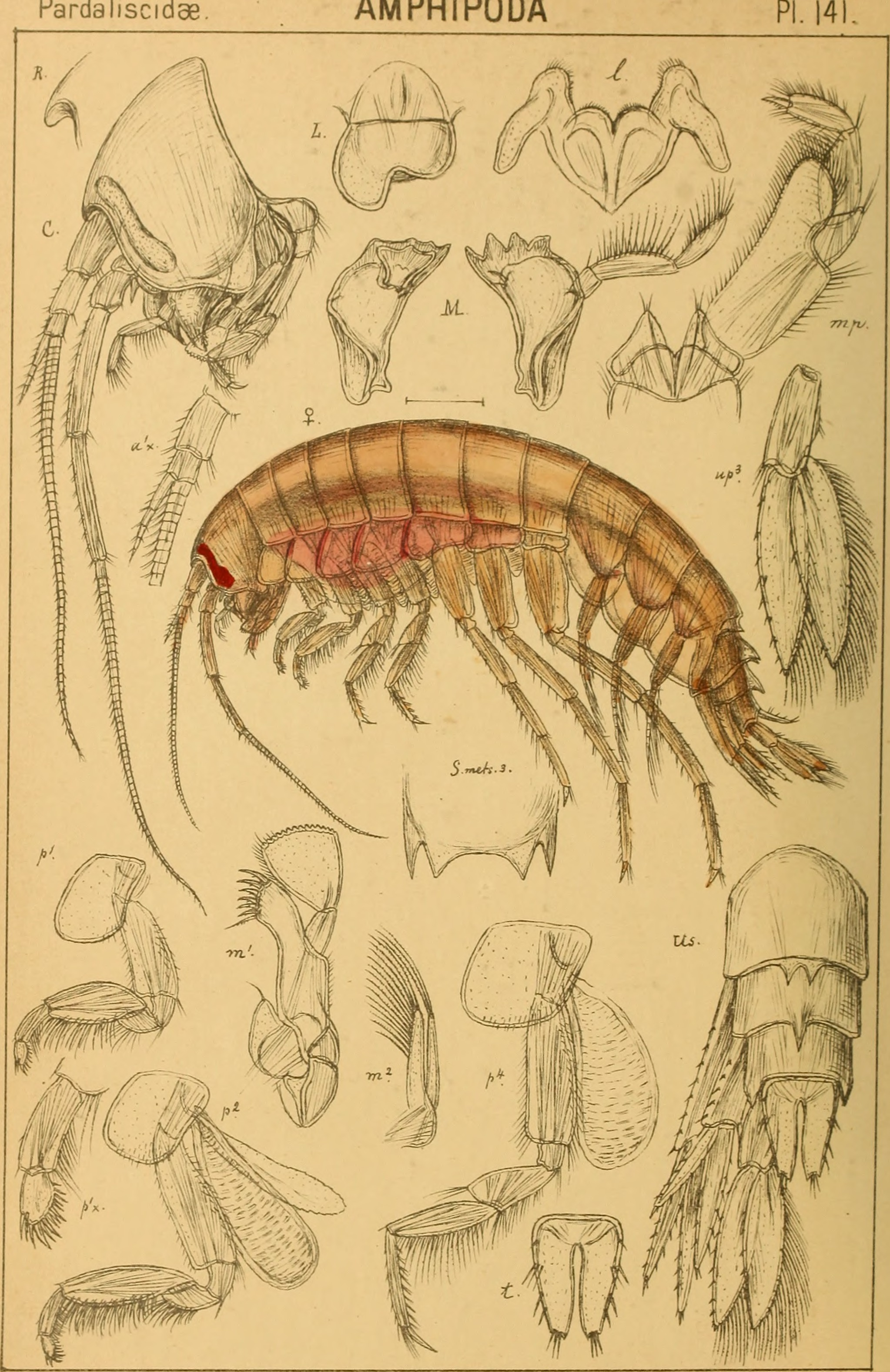

Scientific classification
- Kingdom: Animalia
- Phylum: Arthropoda
- Clade: Pancrustacea
- Class: Malacostraca
- Order: Amphipoda
- Suborder: Amphilochidea
- Infraorder: Lysianassida
- Parvorder: Synopiidira
- Superfamily: Dexaminoidea
- Family: Pardaliscidae; Boeck, 1871

Genera
- See text

= Pardaliscidae =

Family of crustaceans

Pardaliscidae is a family of oceanic amphipods whose members typically inhabit the deepest parts of the abyssal plains. It contains the following genera:

- Andeepia Biswas, Coleman & Hendrycks, 2009
- Antronicippe Stock & Illife, 1990
- Arculfia Barnard, 1961
- Caleidoscopsis G. Karaman, 1974
- Epereopus Mills, 1967
- Halice Boeck, 1871
- Halicella Schellenberg, 1926
- Halicoides Walker, 1896
- Macroarthrus Hendrycks & Conlan, 2003
- Necochea Barnard, 1962
- Nicippe Bruzellius, 1859
- Octomana Hendrycks & Conlan, 2003
- Parahalice Birstein & M. Vinogradov, 1962
- Pardalisca Krøyer, 1842
- Pardaliscella Sars, 1893
- Pardaliscoides Stebbing, 1888
- Pardaliscopsis Chevreux, 1911
- Parpano J. L. Barnard, 1964
- Princaxelia Dahl, 1959
- Rhynohalicella G. Karaman, 1974
- Spelaeonicippe Stock & Vermeulen, 1982
- Tosilus J. L. Barnard, 1966
- Pardisynopia Barnard, 1961 is a synonym of Halicoides Walker, 1896.
