= Hadal zone =

Deepest region of the ocean lying within oceanic trenches

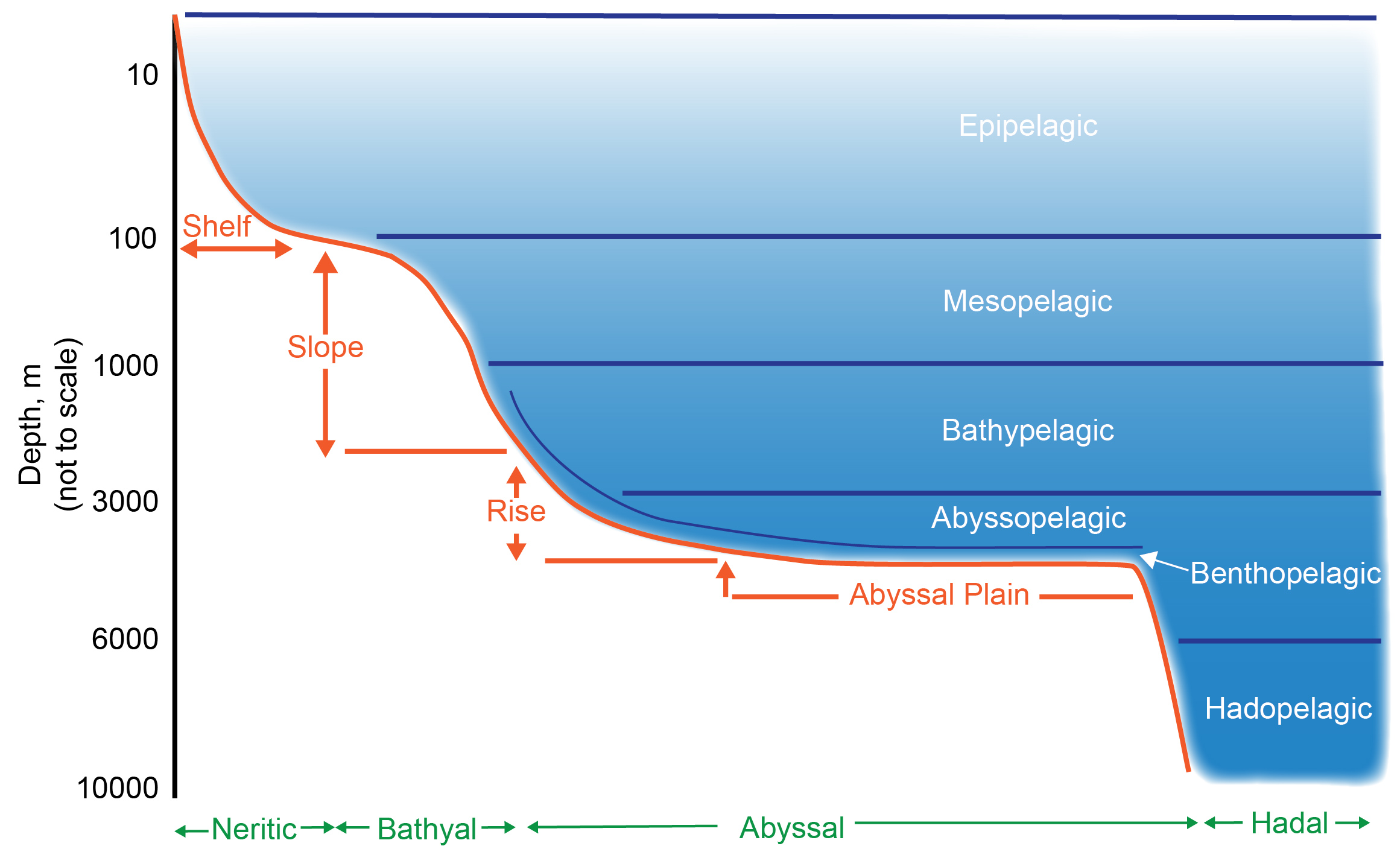
Schematic representation of the zones in the ocean

The hadal zone, also known as the hadopelagic zone or hadalpelagic zone, is the deepest region of the ocean, lying within oceanic trenches. The hadal zone ranges from around 6 to 11 km (3.7 to 6.8 mi; 20,000 to 36,000 ft) below sea level, and exists in long, narrow, topographic V-shaped depressions.

The total area taken up by the 46 individual hadal habitats worldwide is less than 0.25% of the world's seafloor, yet trenches account for over 40% of the ocean's depth range. Most hadal habitats are found in the Pacific Ocean, the largest and deepest of the conventional oceanic divisions.

== Terminology and definition ==
Historically, the hadal zone was not recognized as distinct from the abyssal zone, although the deepest sections were sometimes called "ultra-abyssal". During the early 1950s, the Danish Galathea II and Soviet Vityaz expeditions separately discovered a distinct shift in the life at depths of 6,000–7,000 m (20,000–23,000 ft) not recognized by the broad definition of the abyssal zone. The term "hadal" was first proposed in 1956 by Anton Frederik Bruun to describe the parts of the ocean deeper than 6,000 m (20,000 ft), leaving abyssal for the parts at 4,000–6,000 m (13,000–20,000 ft). The name refers to Hades, the ancient Greek god of the underworld. About 94% of the hadal zone is found in subduction trenches.

Depths in excess of 6,000 m (20,000 ft) are generally in oceanic trenches, but there are also trenches at shallower depths. These shallower trenches lack the distinct shift in lifeforms and are therefore not hadal. Although the hadal zone has gained widespread recognition and many continue to use the first proposed limit of 6,000 m (20,000 ft), it has been observed that 6,000–7,000 m (20,000–23,000 ft) represents a gradual transition between the abyssal and hadal zones, leading to the suggestion of placing the limit in the middle, at 6,500 m (21,300 ft). Among others, this intermediate limit has been adopted by UNESCO. Similar to other depth ranges, the fauna of the hadal zone can be broadly placed into two groups: hadobenthic species (compare benthic zone) living on or at the seabottom/sides of trenches, and hadopelagic species (compare pelagic zone) living in open water.

== Ecology ==
The hadal zone is the deepest part of the marine environment

The deepest ocean trenches are considered the least explored and most extreme marine ecosystems. They are characterized by complete lack of sunlight, low temperatures, nutrient scarcity, and extremely high hydrostatic pressures. The major sources of nutrients and carbon are fallout from upper layers, drifts of fine sediment, and landslides. Most organisms are scavengers and detritivores. As of 2020, over 400 species are known from hadal ecosystems, many of which possess physiological adaptations to the extreme environmental conditions. There are high levels of endemism, and noteworthy examples of gigantism in amphipods, mysids, and isopods and dwarfism in nematodes, copepods, and kinorhynchs.

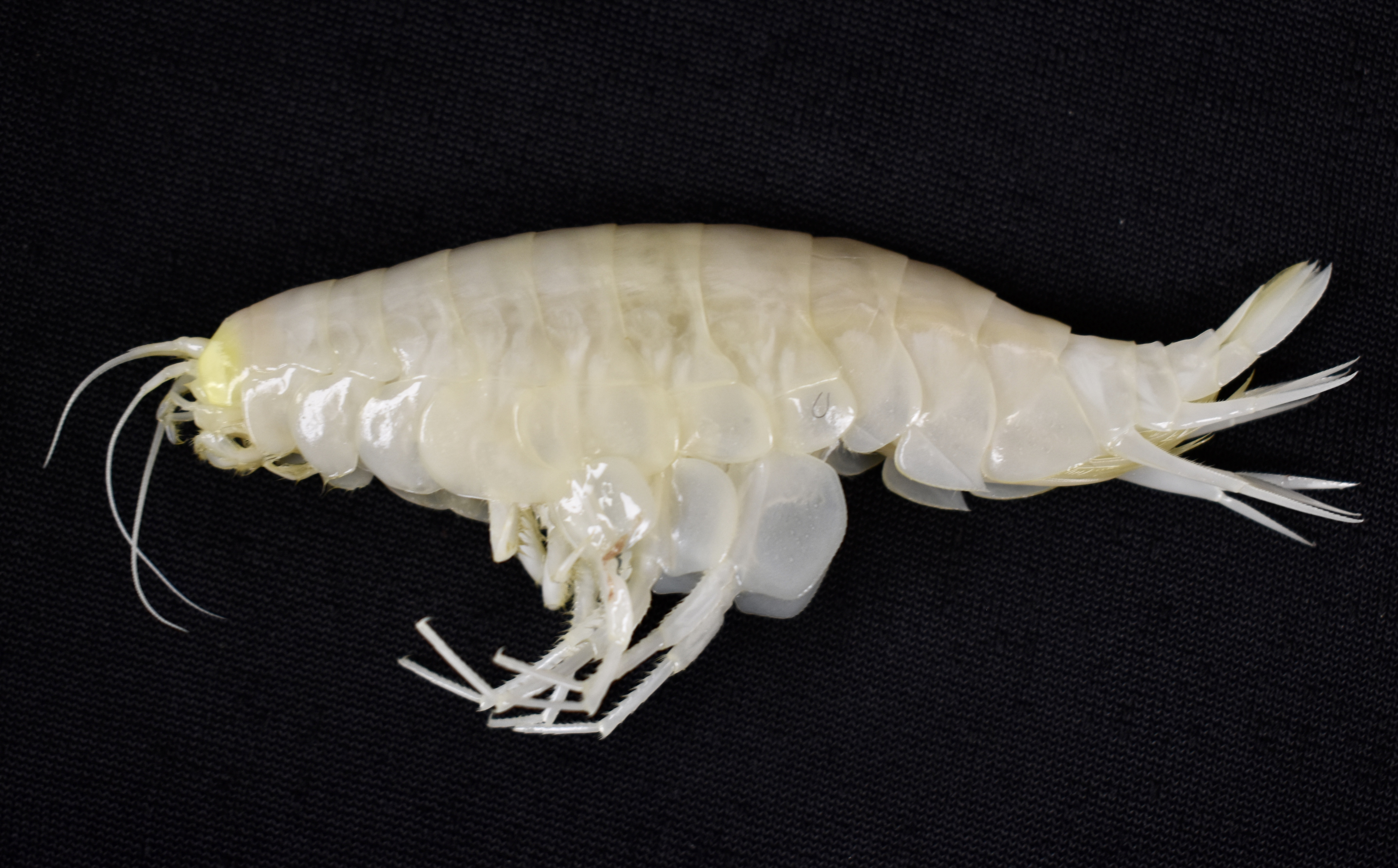
The supergiant amphipod (Alicella gigantea) is found in the Hadal zone (collected from Japan Trench, 2022)

Marine life decreases with depth, both in abundance and biomass, but there is a wide range of metazoan organisms in the hadal zone, mostly benthos, including fish, sea cucumber, bristle worms, bivalves, isopods, sea anemones, amphipods, copepods, decapod crustaceans and gastropods. Most of these trench communities probably originated in the abyssal plains. Although they have evolved adaptations to high pressure and low temperatures such as lower metabolism, intra-cellular protein-stabilising osmolytes, and unsaturated fatty acids in cell membrane phospholipids, there is no consistent relationship between pressure and metabolic rate in these communities. Increased pressure can instead constrain the ontogenic or larval stages of organisms. Pressure increases ten-fold as an organism moves from sea level to a depth of 90 m (300 ft), whilst pressure only doubles as an organism moves from 6,000 to 11,000 m (20,000 to 36,000 ft).

Over a geological time scale, trenches can become accessible as previously stenobathic (limited to a narrow depth range) fauna evolve to become eurybathic (adapted to a wider range of depths), such as grenadiers and natantian prawns. Trench communities do, nevertheless, display a contrasting degree of intra-trench endemism and inter-trench similarities at a higher taxonomic level.

Only a relatively small number of fish species are known from the hadal zone, including certain grenadiers, cutthroat eels, pearlfish, cusk-eels, snailfish and eelpouts. Due to the extreme pressure, the theoretical maximum depth for vertebral fish may be about 8,000–8,500 m (26,200–27,900 ft), below which teleosts would be hyperosmotic, assuming trimethylamine N-oxide requirements follow the observed approximate linear relationship with depth. Some invertebrates do occur deeper, such as bigfin squid, certain polynoid worms, myriotrochid sea cucumbers, turrid snails and pardaliscid amphipods in excess of 10,000 m (33,000 ft). In addition, giant protists known as Xenophyophora (foraminifera) live at these depths.

== Conditions ==
The only known primary producers in the hadal zone are certain bacteria that are able to metabolize hydrogen and methane released by rock and seawater reactions (serpentinization), or hydrogen sulfide released from cold seeps. Some of these bacteria are symbiotic, for example living inside the mantle of certain thyasirid and vesicomyid bivalves. Otherwise the first link in the hadal food web are heterotroph organisms that feed on marine snow, both fine particles and the occasional carcass.

The hadal zone can reach far below 6,000 m (20,000 ft) deep; the deepest known extends to 10,935 m (35,876 ft). At such depths, the pressure in the hadal zone exceeds 1,100 standard atmospheres (110 MPa; 16,000 psi). Lack of light and extreme pressure makes this part of the ocean difficult to explore.

== Exploration ==
The exploration of the hadal zone requires the use of instruments that are able to withstand pressures of up to a thousand or more atmospheres. A few haphazard and non-standard tools have been used to collect limited, but valuable, information about the basic biology of a few hadal organisms. Manned and unmanned submersibles, however, can be used to study the depths in greater detail. Unmanned robotic submersibles may be remotely operated (connected to the research vessel by a cable) or autonomous (freely moving). Cameras and manipulators on submersibles allow researchers to observe and take samples of sediment and organisms. Failures of submersibles under the immense pressure at hadal zone depths have occurred. HROV Nereus is thought to have imploded at a depth of 9,990 meters while exploring the Kermadec Trench in 2014.

== Notable missions ==
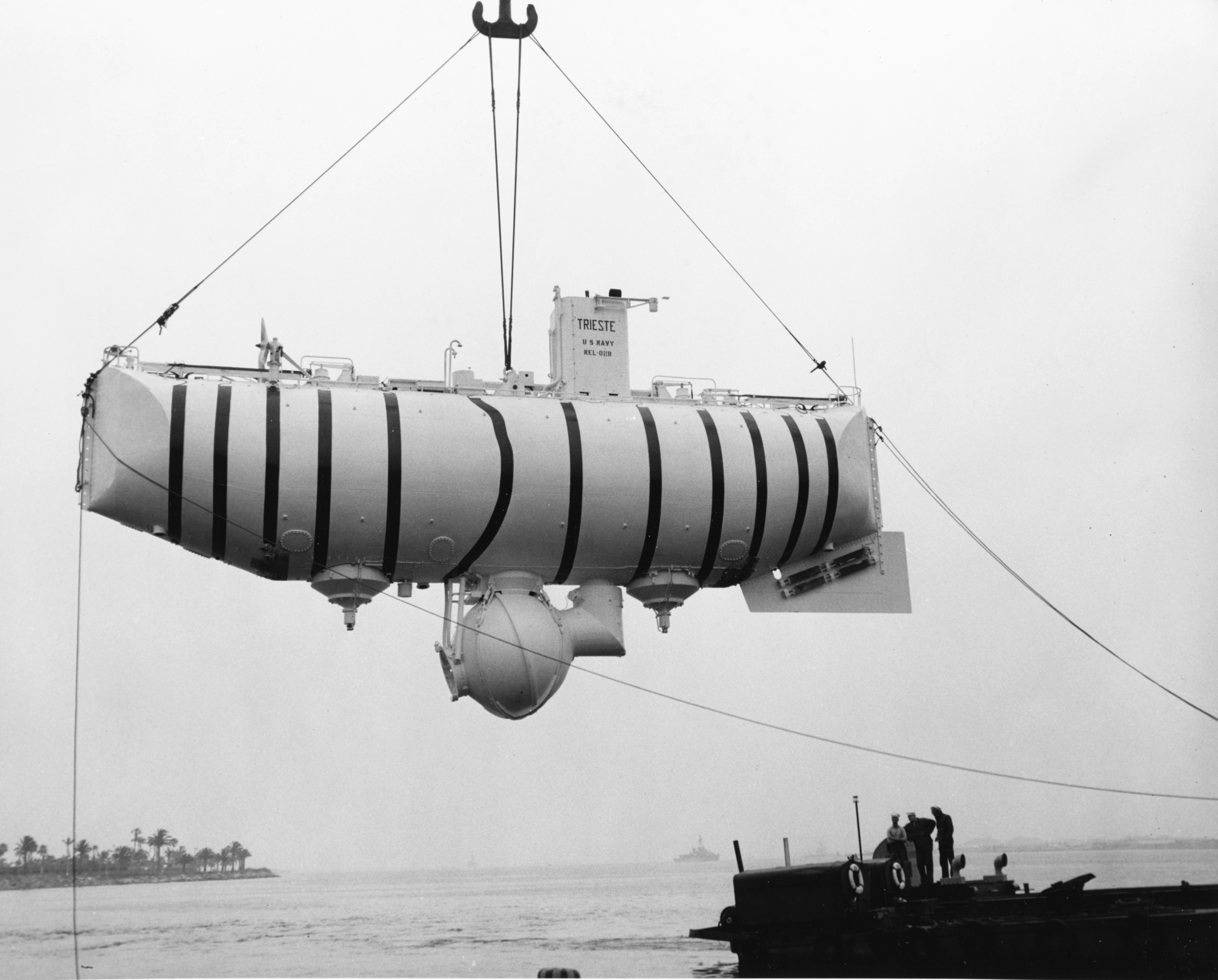
Bathyscaphe Trieste in 1958, used by Piccard and Walsh to reach Challenger Deep

The first manned exploration to reach Challenger Deep, the deepest known part of the ocean located in the Mariana Trench, was accomplished in 1960 by Jacques Piccard and Don Walsh. They reached a maximum depth of 10,911 metres (35,797 ft) in the bathyscaphe Trieste.

James Cameron also reached the bottom of Mariana Trench in March 2012 using the Deepsea Challenger. The descent of the Deepsea Challenger reached a depth of 10,908 metres (35,787 ft), slightly less than the deepest dive record set by Piccard and Walsh. Cameron holds the record for the deepest solo dive.

In June 2012, the Chinese manned submersible Jiaolong was able to reach 7,020 m (23,030 ft) deep in the Mariana Trench, making it the deepest diving manned research submersible to that date. This range surpasses that of the previous record holder, the Japanese-made Shinkai, whose maximum depth is 6,500 m (21,300 ft).

Few unmanned submersibles are capable of descending to maximum hadal depths. The deepest diving unmanned submersibles have included the Kaikō (lost at sea in 2003), the ABISMO, the Nereus (lost at sea in 2014), and the Haidou-1.

== See also ==
- Abyssal plain – Flat area on the deep ocean floor
- Deep sea – Lowest layer in the ocean
- Deep submergence vehicle – Self-propelled deep-diving crewed submersible
- Abyssal zone – Deep layer of the ocean between 4000 and 9000 meters
- Sunlight zone – Uppermost layer of a sea water column that is exposed to sunlight; includes shallow waters and coral reefs
