= Searle (surname) =

Searle is a surname. Notable people with the surname include:

- Adam Searle (born 1969), Australian politician, member of the New South Wales Legislative Council since 2011
- Berni Searle (born 1964), South African photographer and installation artist
- Catherine Searle, American mathematician
- Charles Edward Searle (1828–1902), British academic, Vice-Chancellor of Cambridge University 1888–89
- Damon Searle (born 1971), Welsh footballer
- David Searle (1936–2021), retired Canadian politician and lawyer
- Elhanan J. Searle (1835–1906), associate justice of the Arkansas Supreme Court
- Frank Searle (businessman) (1874–1948), Chief Engineer of the London General Omnibus Company
- Frank Searle (photographer) (1921–2005), British photographer of the Loch Ness Monster
- George Frederick Charles Searle (1864–1954), British physicist
- George Mary Searle (1839–1918), American astronomer
- Greg Searle (born 1972), British Olympic rower, brother of Jonny Searle
- Helen Searle (1834–1884), American painter
- Henry Ernest Searle (1866–1899), Australian professional sculler
- Henry Searle (born 2006), British tennis player
- Humphrey Searle (1915–1982), British composer and musicologist
- James Searle (c. 1730–1797), American merchant
- Janie Searle (1897–1969), New Zealand Salvation Army officer and community leader
- John Searle (1932–2025), American philosopher, famous for work on consciousness and for his speech act theory
- John Gideon Searle (1901–1978), American heir, businessman and philanthropist
- John Preston Searle (1854–1922), American minister and educator
- John W. Searle (1905–1969), Australian minister and educator
- Jonny Searle (born 1969), British Olympic rower, brother of Greg Searle
- J. Clinton Searle (1889–1952), American politician and lawyer
- Kamuela C. Searle (1890–1924), born Samuel Cooper Searle, actor and artist
- Ken Searle (born 1951), Australian artist
- Leonard Searle (1930–2010), American astronomer
- Michael Searle (rugby league) (born 1968), Australian rugby league football personality
- Robert Searle, English pirate of the mid-17th century
- Robert Searle (minister), American Presbyterian minister
- Rod Searle (1920–2014), American politician
- Roger Clive Searle (born 1944), British geophysicist
- Ron Searle (1919–2015), Canadian mayor from 1976 to 1978
- Ronald Searle (1920–2011), British artist, sculptor, medallist and cartoonist
- Ryan Searle (born 1989), Australian baseball player
- Ryan Searle (darts player) (born 1987), British darts player
- Shayle R. Searle (1928–2013), American statistician
- William George Searle (1829–1913), 19th-century British historian

== See also ==
- Justice Searle (disambiguation)
- Searles (surname)
