= Julian Pearce =

Julian Pearce may refer to:

- Julian Pearce (field hockey)
- Julian Pearce (geochemist)
