= Shewanella benthica =

Scientific classification
- Domain: Bacteria
- Kingdom: Pseudomonadati
- Phylum: Pseudomonadota
- Class: Gammaproteobacteria
- Order: Alteromonadales
- Family: Shewanellaceae
- Genus: Shewanella
- Species: S. benthica

Binomial name
- Shewanella benthica MacDonell and Colwell 1986

Type strain
- ATCC 43992, DSM 8812, UM 145, W 145

Species of bacterium

Shewanella benthica is an obligately piezophilic bacterium from the genus Shewanella that has been isolated from the sea cucumber Psychropotes longicauda from the Walvis Ridge. It was discovered at a depth of 10,898 meters by Japan Marine Science and Technology Center scientists using the Kaikō ROV in 1996.
