= Searle =

Searle may refer to:

== Persons ==
- Searle (surname)
- J. Searle Dawley (1877–1949), American film director, producer, screenwriter, stage actor and playwright
- Searle Turton (born 1979), Canadian politician
- John Searle, (1932–2025), American philosopher

== Places ==
- Serle, a comune in Lombardy, Italy
- Nuvuttiq, formerly Cape Searle, an uninhabited headland in Nunavut, Canada
- Searle Pass, a mountain pass in the Gore Range of the Rocky Mountains of Colorado, United States

== Other uses ==
- G. D. Searle & Company, a pharmaceutical corporation that also makes food additives
  - Searle Scholars Program, an award sponsored by the company

== See also ==
- Searle x Waldron, an Australian architecture firm
- Searles (disambiguation)
- Searl, a surname
- Searls, a surname
