= Kaikō ROV =

Japanese remotely operated underwater vehicle for deep sea exploration

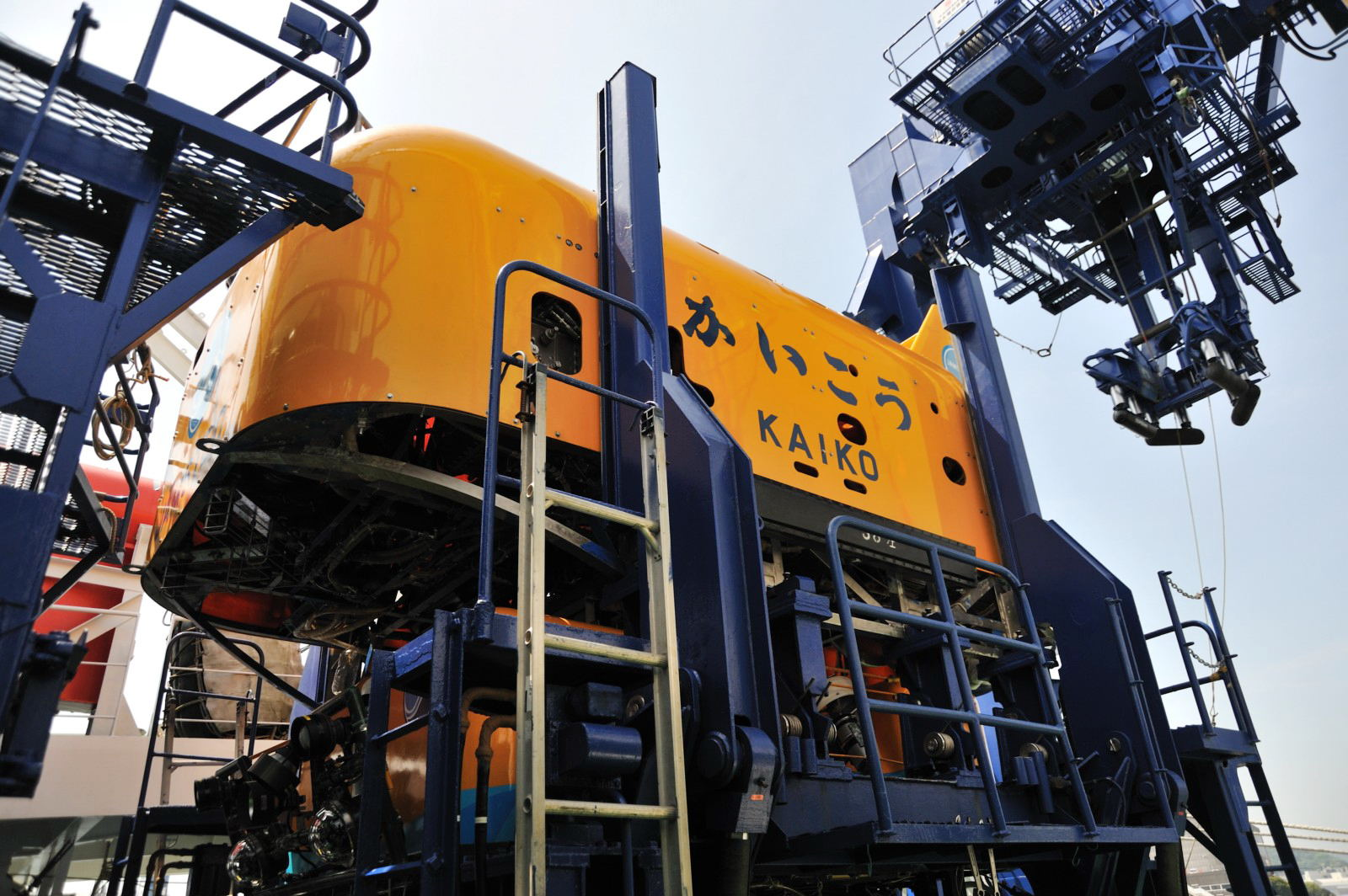
- Kaikō

History

Japan
- Owner: The Japan Agency for Marine-Earth Science and Technology (JAMSTEC)
- Operator: JAMSTEC
- Laid down: 1991
- Launched: 1993
- Christened: 1993
- Completed: 1993
- Commissioned: 1993
- Maiden voyage: May 1993 to March 1995
- Out of service: 2003
- Stricken: 2003
- Home port: Yokosuka, Japan
- Fate: Lost at sea off Shikoku Island during Typhoon Chan-Hom, 29 May 2003

General characteristics
- Type: remotely operated underwater vehicle
- Displacement: 10.6 tons in air
- Length: 3.0 meters
- Installed power: electrical (Lithium-ion batteries)
- Test depth: 10911.4 meters
- Complement: unmanned
- Sensors & processing systems: side-scan sonar and search lights

Kaikō (かいこう; "Ocean Trench") was a remotely operated underwater vehicle (ROV) built by the Japan Agency for Marine-Earth Science and Technology (JAMSTEC) for exploration of the deep sea. Kaikō was the second of only five vessels ever to reach the bottom of the Challenger Deep, as of 2019. Between 1995 and 2003, this 10.6 ton unmanned submersible conducted more than 250 dives, collecting 350 biological species (including 180 different bacteria), some of which could prove to be useful in medical and industrial applications. On 29 May 2003, Kaikō was lost at sea off the coast of Shikoku Island during Typhoon Chan-Hom, when a secondary cable connecting it to its launcher at the ocean surface broke.

Another ROV, Kaikō7000II, served as the replacement for Kaikō until 2007. At that time, JAMSTEC researchers began sea trials for the permanent replacement ROV, ABISMO (Automatic Bottom Inspection and Sampling Mobile).

== Challenger Deep ==
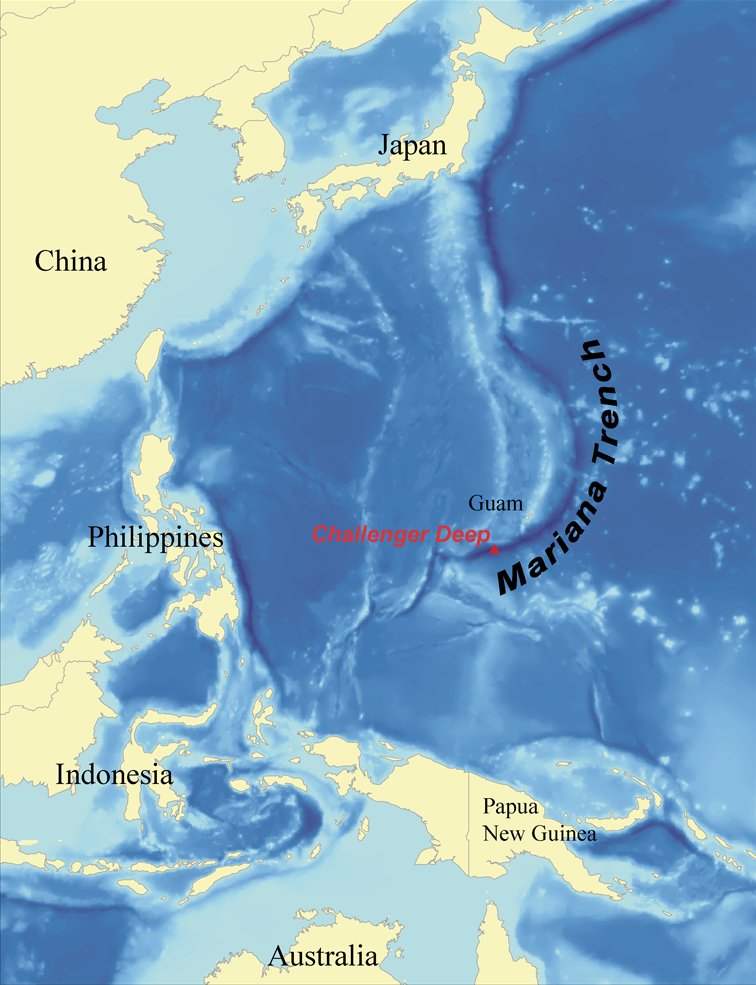
Location of the Challenger Deep in the Mariana Trench

Bathymetric data obtained during the course of the expedition (December 1872 – May 1876) of the British Royal Navy survey ship HMS Challenger enabled scientists to draw maps, which provided a rough outline of certain major submarine terrain features, such as the edge of the continental shelves and the Mid-Atlantic Ridge. This discontinuous set of data points was obtained by the simple technique of taking soundings by lowering long lines from the ship to the seabed.

Among the many discoveries of the Challenger expedition was the identification of the Challenger Deep. This depression, located at the southern end of the Mariana Trench near the Mariana Islands group, is the deepest surveyed point of the World Ocean. The Challenger scientists made the first recordings of its depth on 23 March 1875 at station 225. The reported depth was 4,475 fathoms (8184 meters) based on two separate soundings.

On 23 January 1960, Don Walsh and Jacques Piccard were the first men to descend to the bottom of the Challenger Deep in the Trieste bathyscaphe. Though the initial report claimed the bathyscaphe had attained a depth of 37,800 feet, the maximum recorded depth was later calculated to be 10,911 metres (35,797 ft). At this depth, the water column above exerts a barometric pressure of 108.6 megapascals (15,750 psi), over one thousand times the standard atmospheric pressure at sea level. Since then, only two manned vessels have returned to the Challenger Deep: the Deepsea Challenger, which was piloted by director James Cameron on March 26, 2012, to the bottom of the trench.; and the Limiting Factor, piloted by Victor Vescovo in 2019.

In March 1995, Kaikō became the second vessel ever to reach the bottom of the Challenger Deep, and the first craft to visit this location since the Trieste mission. The maximum depth measured on that dive was 10,911.4 meters, marking the deepest dive for an unmanned submersible to date. On 31 May 2009, Nereus became the third vessel to visit the bottom of the Challenger Deep, reaching a maximum recorded depth of 10,902 meters.

== RV Kairei ==
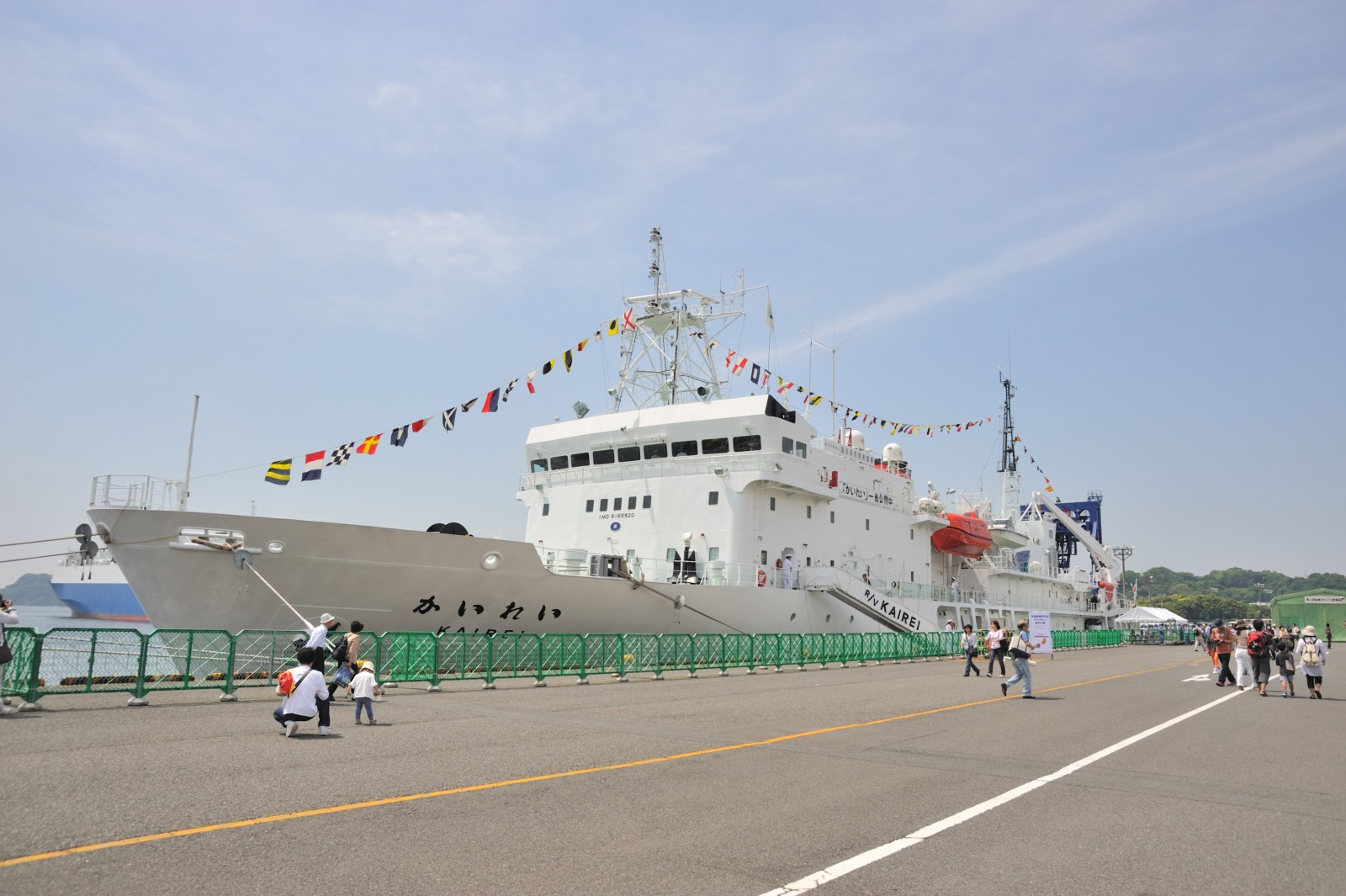
RV Kairei

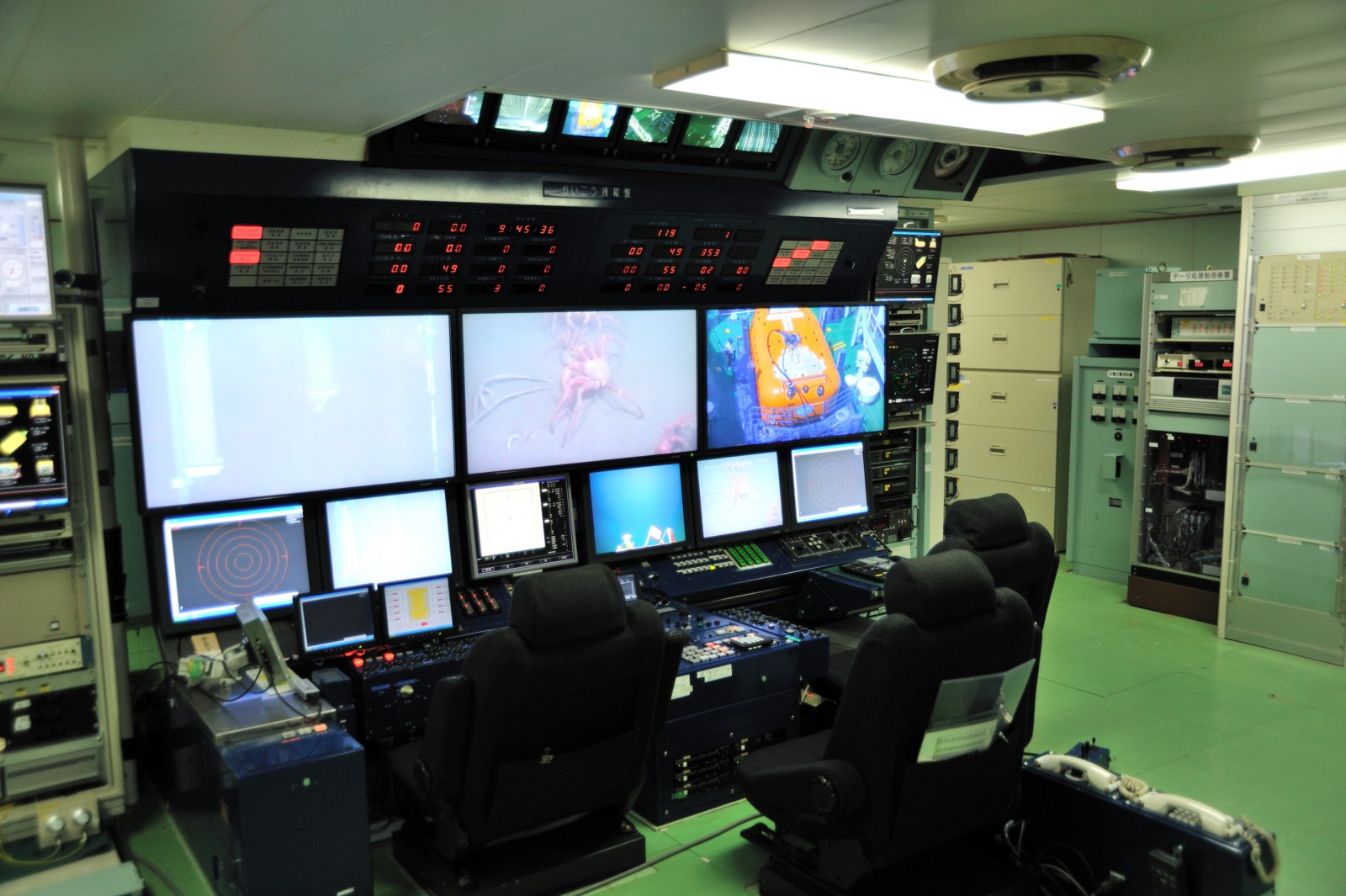
RV Kairei Control Room

RV Kairei is a deep sea research vessel that served as the support ship for Kaikō, and for its replacement ROV, Kaikō 7000 II. It now serves as the support ship for ABISMO. Kairei uses ABISMO to conduct surveys and observations of oceanic plateaus, abyssal plains, oceanic basins, submarine volcanoes, hydrothermal vents, oceanic trenches and other underwater terrain features to a maximum depth of 11,000 meters. Kairei also conducts surveys of the structure of deep sub-bottoms with complicated geographical shapes in subduction zones using its on-board multi-channel reflection survey system.

== Timeline and fate of Kaikō ==
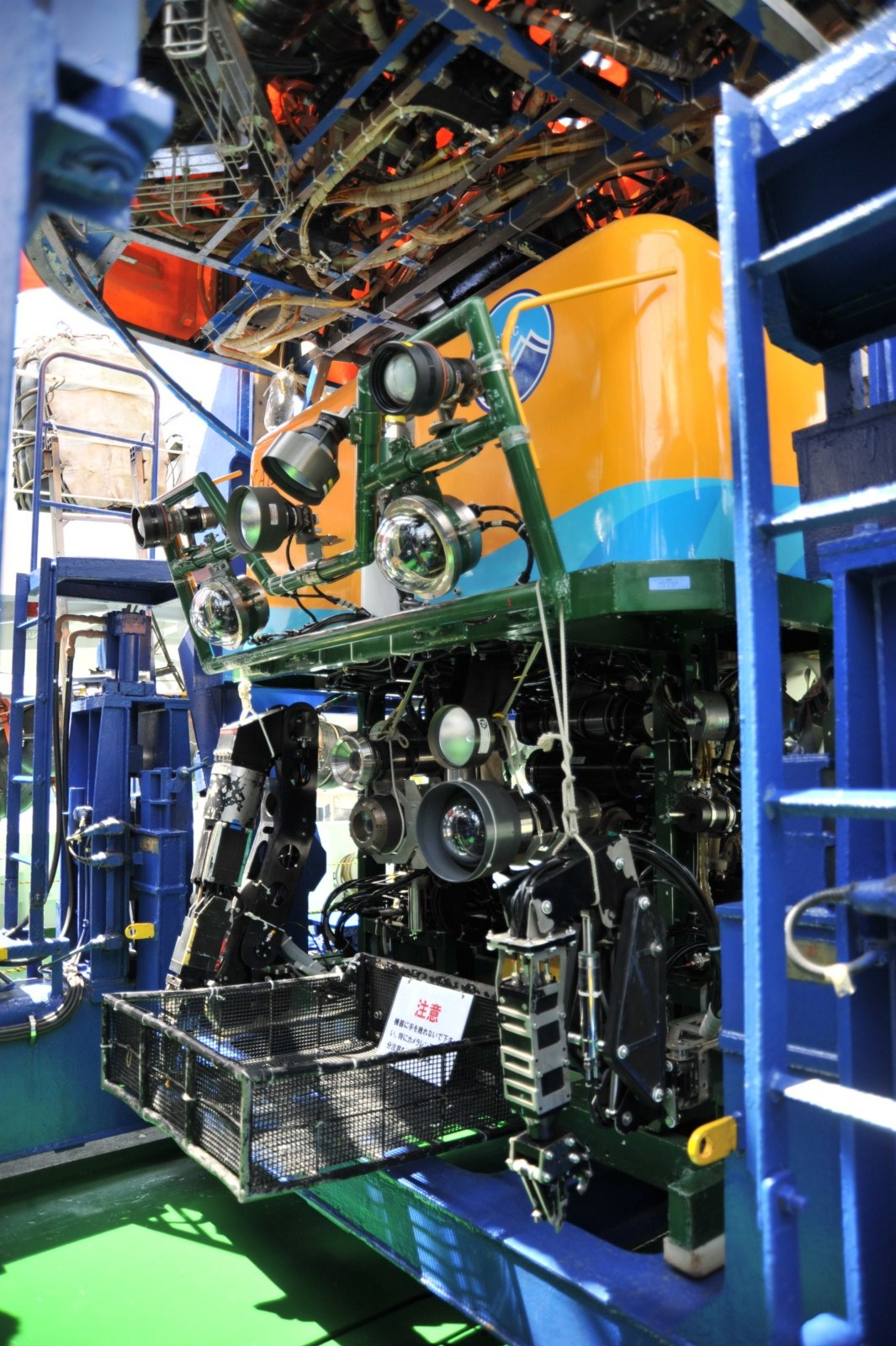
Kaikō7000II Kaikō reached a maximum depth of 10,911.4 meters at the Challenger Deep on 24 March 1995, during its initial sea trials. At that time, the craft collected video and photographs of various barophilic benthos, including tubeworms and shrimp. ROV in position under its launcher, aboard the deep sea research ship RV Kairei.

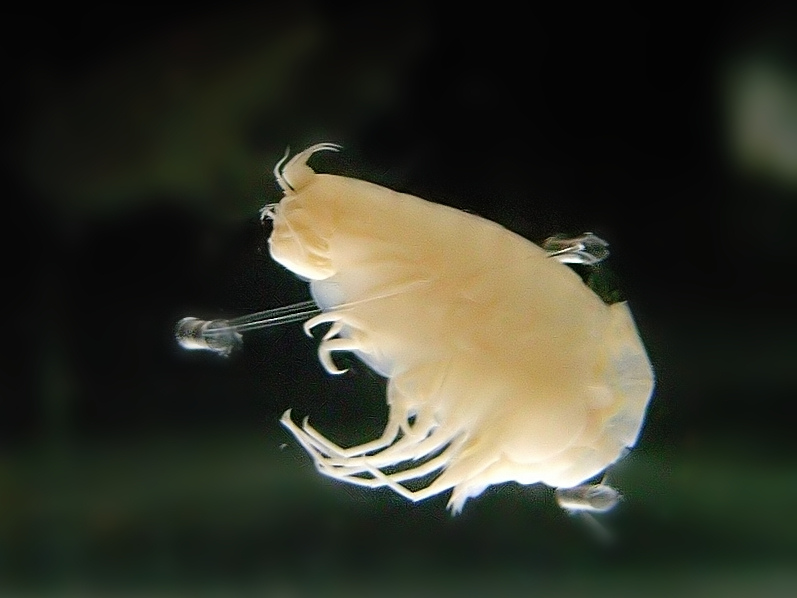
Hirondellea gigas specimen at Enoshima Aquarium, Enoshima Island, Fujisawa, Kanagawa, Japan.

In February 1996, Kaikō returned to Challenger Deep, this time collecting sediment and microorganisms from the seabed at a depth of 10,898 meters. Among the novel organisms identified and collected was Moritella yayanosii and Shewanella benthica. These two species of bacteria appear to be obligately barophilic. The optimal pressure conditions for growth of S. benthica is 70 Megapascals (MPa), while M. yayanosii grows best at 80 MPa; no growth at all was detected at pressures of less than 50 MPa with either strain. Both species appear to contain high levels of docosahexaenoic acid (DHA) and eicosapentaenoic acid (EPA), omega-3 fatty acids which could prove to be useful in the treatment of hypertension and even cancer.

In December 1997, Kaikō located the wreck of Tsushima Maru on the sea floor off the coast of Okinawa. Tsushima Maru was an unmarked Japanese passenger/cargo ship that was sunk during World War II by USS Bowfin, a United States Navy submarine.

In May 1998, Kaikō returned again to Challenger Deep, this time collecting specimens of Hirondellea gigas. Hirondellea gigas (Birstein and Vinagradov, 1955) is a crustacean of the Uristidae family of marine amphipods.

In October 1999, Kaikō performed a robotic mechanical operation at a depth of 2,150 meters off the coast of Okinawa near the Ryukyu Trench, connecting measuring equipment with underwater cables on the sea floor. On this mission, another bacterial species, Shewanella violacea, was discovered at a depth of 5,110 meters. This organism is notable for its brilliant violet-colored pigment. Certain compounds found in S. violacea may have applications in the cosmetic industry (development of products for lightening of skin tone) and also in the semiconductor industry (development of chemicals to be used in production of semiconductors).

In late November 1999, Kaikō located the wreckage of H-2 No. 8, a NASDA rocket (satellite launch system), on the sea floor at a depth of 2,900 meters off the Ogasawara Islands. H-2 flight F8 was conducted on 15 November 1999. The rocket, which was carrying a Multi-Functional Transport Satellite (MTSAT) payload, self-destructed after experiencing an engine malfunction shortly after it was launched.

In August 2000, Kaikō discovered hydrothermal vents and their associated deep sea communities at a depth of 2,450 meters near the Central Indian Ridge. The Central Indian Ridge is a divergent tectonic plate boundary between the African Plate and the Indo-Australian Plate located in the western Indian Ocean.

On 29 May 2003, Kaikō was lost at sea during Typhoon Chan-Hom, when a steel secondary cable connecting it to its launcher at the surface broke off the coast of Shikoku Island.

In May 2004, JAMSTEC resumed its research operations, using a converted ROV as its vehicle. The ROV, formerly known as UROV 7K, was rechristened Kaikō 7000 II. The 7000 designation indicates that this vessel is rated for diving to a maximum depth of 7,000 meters.

== Development of ABISMO ==
While the temporary replacement ROV (Kaikō 7000 II) has a remarkable performance record, it is only rated to 7,000 meters and cannot reach the deepest oceanic trenches. For this reason, JAMSTEC engineers began work on a new 11,000-meter class ROV in April 2005. The project is called ABISMO (Automatic Bottom Inspection and Sampling Mobile), which translates to abyss in Spanish. Initial sea trials of ABISMO were conducted in 2007. The craft successfully reached a planned depth of 9,760-meters, the deepest part of Izu–Ogasawara Trench, where it collected core samples of sediment from the seabed.

== See also ==
- MIR – Self-propelled deep submergence vehicle
- Shinkai – Crewed research submersible
- Explorer – Autonomous underwater vehicle from People's Republic of China
- Nereus – Hybrid remotely operated or autonomous underwater vehicle
- ABISMO ROV – Japanese remotely operated underwater vehicle for deep sea exploration
- Autonomous underwater vehicle – Uncrewed underwater vehicle with autonomous guidance system
- Bathymetry – Study of underwater depth of lake or ocean floors
- Deep sea – Lowest layer in the ocean
- Deep-submergence vehicle – Self-propelled deep-diving crewed submersible
- Diving chamber – Hyperbaric pressure vessel for human occupancy used in diving operations
- Timeline of diving technology – Chronological list of notable events in the history of underwater diving equipment
