= Searl =

Searl is a surname. Notable people with the surname include:

- Doug Searl (born 1947), Australian rules footballer
- Jackie Searl (1921–1991), American child actor
- Madeline Searl (born 1994), Australian footballer
- Nina Searl (1883–1955), British psychoanalyst
- Sid Searl (1917–2000), Australian rules footballer

== See also ==
- Searle (disambiguation)
- Searles (disambiguation)
- Searls
- Serle
- Serles
