= British Mid-Ocean Ridge Initiative =

Oceanography research project

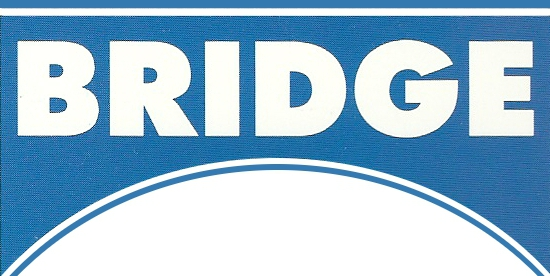
British Mid-Ocean Ridge Initiative

The British Mid-Ocean Ridge Initiative (the BRIDGE Programme) was a multidisciplinary scientific investigation of the creation of the Earth's crust in the deep oceans. It was funded by the UK's Natural Environment Research Council (NERC) from 1993 to 1999.

== Mid-Ocean ridges ==
Mid-Ocean ridges are active volcanic mountain ranges snaking through the depths of the Earth's oceans. They occur where the edges of the Earth's tectonic plates are separating, allowing mantle rock to rise to the seafloor and harden, creating new crust. The addition of this crust can cause ocean basins to widen perpendicular to the ridge. This seafloor spreading is the engine of continental drift. (Note: For an explanation of the destruction of the Earth's crust elsewhere in the oceans, without which the crust would constantly grow, see the entry on Subduction) At intervals along the mid-ocean ridges super-heated mineral-rich fluids are vented from the seabed. These hydrothermal vents are populated by animal and bacterial species not found elsewhere on Earth.

BRIDGE investigated the geological setting of the ridge, the geochemistry of vent fluids, and ways in which biological communities survive in this apparently hostile environment. To achieve this the programme developed novel deep-ocean technologies for deployment from surface ships and crewed submersibles. It also conducted experimental research into the mechanical and chemical nature of the rocks and underlying crust in these active volcanic regions. The scale of the investigation ranged from extensive regional studies mapping unexplored seafloor to microscopic and chemical analyses at individual vent sites. To achieve the programme's objectives work was focused at five contrasting locations: the Mid-Atlantic Ridge at 24–30°N; the Mid-Atlantic Ridge at 36–39°N; Iceland and the Reykjanes Ridge to its south west; the Scotia back-arc basin (SW Atlantic); and the Lau basin (SW Pacific). Intensive localised studies were made within these areas. (Note: BRIDGE Newsletter No. 14 (spring 1998): back cover)

== Background to BRIDGE ==
The idea for a British mid-ocean ridge research programme was developed by Professors Joe Cann of Leeds University and Roger Searle of Durham University after they attended a meeting in Oregon in 1987 where the idea for a US mid-ocean ridge research programme (the RIDGE Program) was being developed. (Note: BRIDGE Newsletter No. 13 (autumn 1997): p. 12 and No. 17 (autumn 1999): p. 7) (Note: The US Ridge Interdisciplinary Global Experiments program (RIDGE) was funded by the National Science Foundation from 1989 and moved into phase two in 1999 as RIDGE 2000.) In the UK researchers in many disciplines were already studying mid-ocean ridges but it was felt this research could be better integrated to produce new multidisciplinary approaches yielding results of wider significance.

The 'BRIDGE' branding of research commenced before research council funding was sought for a formal programme. BRIDGE was mentioned by name in The Independent newspaper in February 1989. (Note: BRIDGE Newsletter No. 13: p. 12) By this time the community of researchers in this field were referring to themselves as the BRIDGE Consortium. Deep-ocean science cruises were being identified as BRIDGE cruises by 1990. (Note: BRIDGE Newsletter No. 15 (autumn 1998): p. 64) The first BRIDGE newsletter appeared in 1991.

Once the idea of BRIDGE was in place an application for funding was made to the Natural Environment Research Council. This was successful and full funding commenced in 1993 for a programme that would run until 1999. (Note: BRIDGE Newsletter No. 13: p. 13) The final budget was £13M. (Note: At 1999 exchange rates: €20M or US$21M.)

== Aims ==
- To invest in British mid-ocean ridge research so that both human skills and instrument resources were increased
- To use both existing capabilities and newly developed instruments to solve some of the fundamental scientific problems pertaining to mid-ocean ridges
- To expand UK mid-ocean ridge research to involve a wider range of skills and new techniques
- To seek both direct and indirect commercial benefits from mid-ocean ridge research
- To liaise with other national programmes to maximise the benefits of British activities

This last aim was achieved directly and by participation in the international InterRidge network.

== Objectives ==
- To undertake the crucial observations, experiments and modelling aimed at solving fundamental scientific problems
- To conduct the basic surveys necessary to site both regional and local studies
- To develop new marine instrumentation for use in experiments
- To acquire access to the survey vehicles and instruments necessary for undertaking the science
- To attract scientists from diverse disciplines to participate in mid-ocean ridge research
- To consult the UK marine instrumentation community to refine requirements for, and capabilities of, new instruments
- To seek active involvement of the UK biotechnology community in mid-ocean ridge research
- To construct and update plans that would enable these aims and objectives to be met

== Scientific problems ==
From the wide range of scientific problems that could be addressed by mid-ocean ridge research, BRIDGE identified six that were of most relevance to UK research.

- How does the three-dimensional structure of mid-ocean ridges, and especially their segmentation by transform faults and similar features, relate to the physical properties and dynamics of the underlying Earth's mantle?
- Can the geochemistry of the lavas erupted at mid-ocean ridges give insights into the scale and origin of heterogeneities in the underlying mantle?
- What is the nature of the magmatic plumbing system within the crust and upper mantle below mid-ocean ridges?
- How does the rate of flow and geochemical composition of the black smoker hydrothermal vent fluids vary with time, and what causes this variation? Can this help us to understand more about the origin of ore deposits found on land?
- How do the bacteria that live around the black smoker hot springs survive the high temperatures and the toxic environment? Can these capabilities be exploited in biotechnology?
- How do the chemical and biological processes at the black smoker vent fields affect the global flux of chemical species in and out of the ocean? Are the nutrient levels of the oceans partly controlled from the mid-ocean ridges?

== Programme structure ==
=== Science ===
The scientific aims and objectives of the programme were directed by an international steering committee which met twice a year. The programme held a series of annual funding rounds to which scientists and engineers in the field submitted research proposals. Following a peer-review assessment of each proposal by independent referees the steering committee ranked the most highly rated proposals on their scientific merit and contribution to the programme's objectives. This short-list was then recommended to NERC for funding. (Note: BRIDGE Newsletter No. 9 (autumn 1995): p. 59)

=== Management ===
From 1993 to 1995 programme management (day-to-day administration and budget oversight) was undertaken by NERC head office in Swindon. A separate Science Coordinator role (incorporating, among other duties, responsibility for expanding the BRIDGE Consortium, organising national conferences and publishing the newsletter) was based at Leeds University where the BRIDGE Chief Scientist, Joe Cann, was chairman of Earth Sciences.

In 1995 NERC began contracting out programme management for their large programmes. (Note: BRIDGE Newsletter No. 8 (spring 1995): p. 66) BRIDGE programme management absorbed the science coordination role and a new programme manager was appointed, based at Leeds University. The Leeds BRIDGE office was the programme hub until the end of March 1999 after which the conclusion of the programme was administered by NERC. (Note: BRIDGE Newsletter No. 16 (spring 1999): p. 3)

== Programme content ==
BRIDGE funded 44 research projects: 4 multidisciplinary; 15 geology; 6 biology; 11 studies of the hydrothermal environment at vent fields (9 of the ocean floor and 2 of the overlying water column); and 8 engineering projects to develop the required technologies. (Note: All projects are listed in BRIDGE Newsletter No. 13: pp. 12–13. Reports from 16 of these are summarised in Newsletters 14: pp. 14–25 and 15: pp. 52–55) More than 200 scientists in 28 research centres around the UK contributed to this programme. (Note: BRIDGE Newsletter No. 17: p. 2) There were 26 BRIDGE deep-ocean research cruises to the North Atlantic, SW Atlantic, SE Pacific, SW Pacific and Indian oceans, 18 of which were directly funded by the programme. (Note: BRIDGE Newsletter No. 15: p. 64)

== Results ==
To discuss and publicise the programme's results BRIDGE organised its own science conferences at Durham University (1991), the Institute of Oceanographic Sciences Deacon Laboratory (IOSDL), Wormley (1992), Leeds University (1993), Oxford University (1994), the Geological Society of London (1994, 1995 and 1997), Cambridge University (1996), Southampton Oceanography Centre (1997) and Bristol University (1998). (Note: BRIDGE Newsletter No. 16: p. 51) In addition BRIDGE science was reported at other meetings nationally and internationally, for example: at the Royal Society meeting Mid-Ocean Ridges: Dynamics of Processes Associated with Creation of New Ocean Crust (1996), (Note: BRIDGE Newsletter No. 10 (spring 1996): pp. 64–65) the 1996 British Association for the Advancement of Science annual science festival at Birmingham in a BRIDGE session entitled Abyssal Inferno: Seafloor volcanoes, hot vents and exotic life at the mid-ocean ridges, (Note: BRIDGE Newsletter No. 10: p. 36) at Geoscience 98, Keele University (1998), (Note: BRIDGE Newsletter No. 13: p. 71) at the meeting Technology for Deep-Sea Geological Investigations at the Geological Society of London (1998) (Note: BRIDGE Newsletter No. 16: pp. 52–65) and at meetings of the American Geophysical Union.

Three of the BRIDGE conferences resulted in books published by the Geological Society of London, presenting in greater detail the science reported at the meetings.

Throughout the programme rapid publication of results was effected through The BRIDGE Newsletter. In style this was an academic journal (but without peer review) comprising BRIDGE science results together with conference announcements, meeting reports, cruise reports, updates from the mid-ocean ridge programmes of other nations and general news items of relevance to this field of research. (Note: The articles published in issues 1–12 were listed in BRIDGE Newsletter No. 13: pp. 73–82) It was published twice a year in spring and autumn. The first issue of eight stapled sheets appeared in August 1991 but after NERC funding commenced it was commercially printed and bound. By issue 10, in April 1996, it had grown to 100 pages and was being distributed to more than 600 researchers and interested parties in 20 countries. (Note: BRIDGE Newsletter No. 13: p. 13) The last newsletter, No. 17, was produced in autumn 1999 as a magazine called The Fiery Deep, Exploring a New Earth summarising the programme and its results to that time. On 16 November 1999 at the Natural History Museum, London these results were presented to invited guests at a formal end of programme meeting.

As the programme ended, Joe Cann reported, "As a result of the BRIDGE initiative, several groups of UK scientists are at the forefront of international research in mid-ocean ridge science. The areas of expertise of these scientists range from marine geophysics and geodynamics, physical and chemical oceanography, to marine biology." "Every area had success. Here are a few examples. We found new pools of molten rock below the ocean floor where none was expected. We discovered large fields of hot springs, where the wisdom of the time said there should be none. We followed the strange lifecycle of the blind shrimp that live around hot springs in the Atlantic. We made sonar images of the first of a family of enormous faults that slice through the ocean floor, bringing deep rock to the surface. We showed how the flow of one of the big, hot spring fields was affected by scientific drilling. We traced the relationships between animals in hot spring communities up and down the Atlantic. We built new instruments, too, that can operate in these hostile regions". (Note: BRIDGE Newsletter No. 17: p. 7)

== Legacy ==
In addition to the results of the researches, which are still quoted, the BRIDGE Programme left an interdisciplinary community of deep-ocean scientists with a proven track record of collaboration and new equipment for working at depths of over 3,500 metres. (Note: BRIDGE Newsletter No. 17: pp. 42–45)

=== BRIDGE equipment ===
BRIDGE had purchased for the UK research fleet a Simrad multibeam echosounder for mapping the seafloor from a surface ship. To increase detail in any geographical areas of interest it also funded upgrades to the existing UK Towed Ocean Bottom Instrument (TOBI), which made 3D images of the seabed as it was towed 300m above the ocean floor. TOBI was modified to increase its resolution, to add a gyrocompass and to add a three component magnetometer for measuring the magnetic field of the seafloor rock over which it was towed. (Note: BRIDGE Newsletter No. 16: pp. 57–58 and No. 17: pp. 43–44)

The BRIDGE Towed instrument (BRIDGET), was developed for hunting and studying the plumes of warm, mineral rich fluids rising into the water column from vent fields. This "hot-spring sniffer" was towed at depth behind a ship in areas where vent fields were suspected to occur and fed geochemical data back to the ship in real time. (Note: BRIDGE Newsletter No. 16: p. 59 and No. 17: pp. 7 and 30)

Once fields had been detected the fluids venting from the sea-floor could be studied directly using the MEDUSA instrument. Deployed by a deep submergence vehicle, this could be placed over individual vents for extended time periods to record the characteristics of the fluids as they emerge. At the BRIDGE programme's close six MEDUSA instruments had been built with BRIDGE funding, three more were constructed for the Geological Survey of Japan, and the next generation was being developed for various US agencies including NASA. (Note: BRIDGE Newsletter No. 16: pp. 54–55 and No. 17: p. 44)

For examining the rock of the mid-ocean ridge a new deep ocean drill, the BRIDGE Drill, was developed which marked the core as it drilled. The marking of the core allowed the original north–south orientation of the core to be known after it had been removed. This permitted the magnetic alignment of the rock from which the sample was taken to be determined, providing information on sea-bed movements that had taken place after the rock had formed. (Note: BRIDGE Newsletter No. 13: pp. 17–19, No. 15: pp. 18–20 and 16: pp. 53–54)

For study of the dispersal of animals found at the vent fields, the biologists developed a Planktonic Larval Sampler for Molecular Analysis (PLASMA). This was designed to take samples of water to catch the dispersing larvae of animals living around the vents. PLASMA could be left on the sea-bed in the vicinity of a vent field for up to a year if required, sampling at programmed intervals and preserving any larvae for DNA analysis after the recovery of the equipment. (Note: BRIDGE Newsletter No. 15: pp. 26–29)

=== BRIDGE data archive ===
BRIDGE collected and compiled: multibeam bathymetry, sonar imagery, seismic data, electromagnetic data, gravimetry, petrology (including rock sections, cores, sediments and analytical data), chemical and physical oceanography (samples and analytical data), macro- and microbiology (specimens, film and analytical data); numerical models and audiovisual records. For the benefit of future researchers a BRIDGE data archive was lodged with the UK's National Oceanography Centre at Southampton. (Note: BRIDGE Newsletter No. 13: pp. 9–11, No. 14: p.34 and No. 17: p. 45)
