= Searles (surname) =

Searles is a surname. Notable people with the surname include:

- A. Langley Searles (1920–2009), American chemist
- Adam Searles (born 1981), British actor
- Baird Searles (1934–1993), American science fiction author and critic
- Charles Searles (1937–2004), American artist
- Colbert Searles (1873–1947), American college football coach
- DeWitt Searles (1920–2021), American Air Force major general
- Edward Francis Searles (1841–1920), American architect
- Helen McGaffey Searles (1856–1936), American professor, classicist, and women's suffragist
- Harold Searles (1918–2015), American psychiatrist
- Javon Searles (born 1986), Barbadian cricketer
- John Searles, American author and magazine editor
- Joseph L. Searles III (1942–2021), American stockbroker
- Mary Hopkins Searles (1818–1891), American businesswoman
- Michael Searles (1750–1813), English architect
- Robert L. Searles (1919–2004), American businessman and politician

== See also ==
- Searle (surname)
