= Searls =

Searls is a surname. Notable people with the surname include:

- Damion Searls, American writer and translator
- Dane Searls (1988–2011), Australian BMX rider
- Doc Searls (born 1947), blogger on Linux
- Fanny Searls (1851–1939), American doctor and botanical collector, after whom Searls’ prairie clover Dalea searlsiae is named
- Hank Searls (1922–2017), American writer and screenwriter
- Niles Searls (1825–1907), American judge

== See also ==
- Searles (disambiguation)
- Searl
- Searle (disambiguation)
- Serles
