= Searles =

Searles may refer to:

== People ==
- Searles (surname)
- Searles G. Shultz (1897–1975), New York politician
- Searles Valentine Wood (1798–1880), English palaeontologist

== Places in the United States ==
- Searles, Minnesota, an unincorporated community and census-designated place
- Searles Lake, a dry lake in the Mojave Desert of California
- Searles Valley, in the Mojave Desert of California

== American schools ==
- Searles School and Chapel, Windham, New Hampshire, on the National Register of Historic Places
- Searles High School, a former school building in Methuen, Massachusetts, on the National Register of Historic Places
- Searles High School (Great Barrington, Massachusetts), a former high school

== See also ==
- Searle (disambiguation)
- Searls
