= Japan Agency for Marine-Earth Science and Technology =

Japanese research institute

Coordinates: 35°19′12.8″N 139°38′57.5″E

- 国立研究開発法人海洋研究開発機構

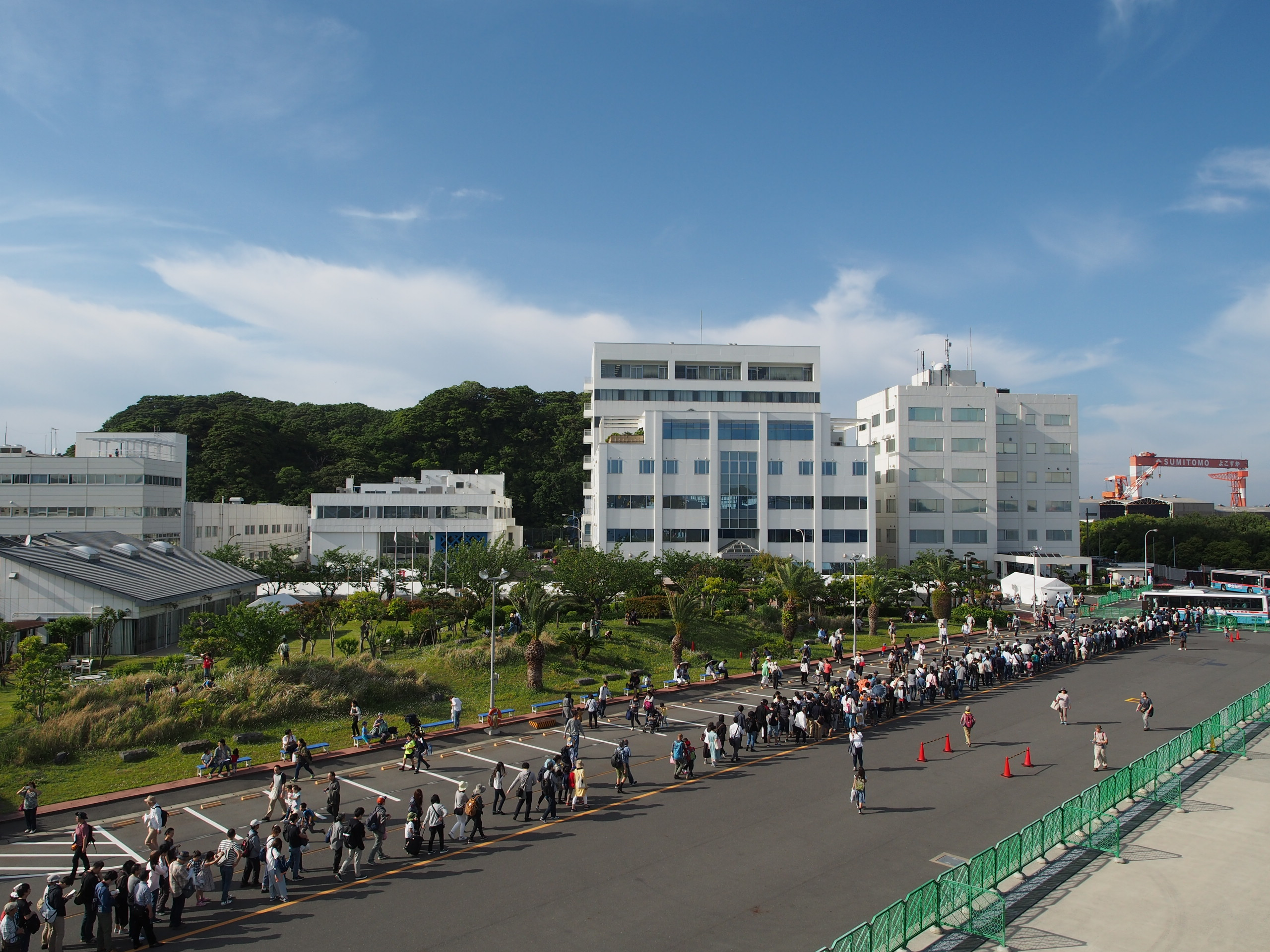
- JAMSTEC headquarters in Yokosuka
- Predecessor: Japan Marine Science and Technology Center
- Established: 1 October 1971; 55 years ago (as Japan Marine Science and Technology Center)
- Purpose: Japanese national research institute for marine-earth science and technology
- Headquarters: Yokosuka, Kanagawa Prefecture, Japan
- Members: 1026 people (2016 (fiscal year))
- Owner: MEXT
- Leader: Taira Asahiko
- Budget: ¥33.9 billion / $304 million (FY2016)
- Website: www.jamstec.go.jp

The Japan Agency for Marine-Earth Science and Technology (国立研究開発法人海洋研究開発機構, Kokuritsu-Kenkyū-Kaihatsu-Hōjin Kaiyō Kenkyū Kaihatsu Kikō; lit. "National Research and Development Legal Entity: Oceanic Research and Development Institute"), or JAMSTEC (海洋機構), is a Japanese national research institute for marine-earth science and technology. It was founded as Japan Marine Science and Technology Center (海洋科学技術センター) in October 1971, and became an Independent Administrative Institution administered by the Ministry of Education, Culture, Sports, Science and Technology (MEXT) in April 2004.

== Projects ==
=== International projects ===
- The Array for Real Time Geostrophic Oceanography (ARGO)
- The Climate Variability and Predictability Programme (CLIVAR)
- Global Earth Observation System of Systems (GEOSS)
- Global Ocean Observing System (GOOS)
- International Continental Scientific Drilling Program (ICDP)
- The International Margins Program (InterMARGINS)
- An initiative for international cooperation in ridge-crest studies (InterRidge)
- Integrated Ocean Drilling Program (IODP)
- North Pacific Marine Science Organization (PICES)

== Organization ==
JAMSTEC is organized into three sections: Research, Development and Promotion, and Management.

=== Research ===
- Research Institute for Global Change (RIGC)
  - Ocean Climate Change Research Program
  - Tropical Climate Variability Research Program
  - Northern Hemisphere Cryosphere Program
  - Environmental Biogeochemical Cycle Research Program
  - Global Change Projection Research Program
  - Climate Variation Predictability and Applicability Research Program
  - Advanced Atmosphere-Ocean-Land Modeling Program
- Institute for Research on Earth Evolution (IFREE)
  - Plate Dynamics Research Program
  - Solid Earth Dynamics Research Program
  - Deep Earth Dynamics Research Program
  - Geochemical Evolution Research Program
- Institute of Biogeosciences (Biogeos)
  - Marine Biodiversity Research Program
  - Extremobiosphere Research Program
  - Earth and Life History Research Program
- Leading Project
  - Earthquake and Tsunami Research Project for Disaster Prevention
  - Global Warming Research Project for IPCC – AR5
  - Submarine Resources Research Project
- Laboratory System
  - Laboratory for Earth Systems Science
    - Precambrian Ecosystem Laboratory Unit
    - Space and Earth System Modeling Research Lab. Unit
  - Application Laboratory
    - Climate Variations Research Laboratory Unit
- Mutsu Institute for Oceanography (MIO)
  - Research Group
  - Research Promotion Group
  - General Affairs Division, MIO
- Kochi Institute for Core Sample Research (KOCHI)
  - Research Group
  - Science Services Group
  - General Affairs Division, KOCHI
- Research Support Department
  - Research Support Division I
  - Research Support Division II

=== Development and promotion ===
- Marine Technology and Engineering Center (MARITEC)
  - Planning and Coordination Group
  - Marine Technology Development Department
  - Research Fleet Department
  - Research Vessel Construction Department
- Earth Simulator Center (ESC)
  - Information Systems Department
  - Advanced Simulation and Technology Development Program
  - Simulation Application Research and Development Program
- Data Research Center for Marine-Earth Sciences (DrC)
  - Data Management and Engineering Department (DMED)
  - Global Oceanographic Data Center (GODAC)
- Center for Deep Earth Exploration (CDEX)
  - Planning and Coordination Department, CDEX
  - Operations Department
  - Technology Development Group
  - Science Promotion Group
  - HSE Group
- Advanced Research and Technology Promotion Department
  - Research Advancement Division
  - International Affairs Division
  - Public Relations Division
  - Library Division
- Observing System Research and Technological Development Laboratory
  - Southern Ocean Buoy Laboratory Unit
  - Autonomous Profiling Shuttle Development Laboratory Unit

=== Management ===
- Planning Department
  - Planning Division
  - Technology Planning Office
  - Press Office
- Administration Department
  - Administration Division
  - Personnel Division
  - Facility Management Division
  - Employee Support Division
  - YES General Affairs Division
  - Tokyo Office
  - Legal Affairs Office
- Finance and Contracts Department
  - Finance and Accounting Division
  - Accounting Division
  - Contracts Division I
  - Contracts Division II
- Safety and Environment Management Office
- Audit Office

== Equipment ==
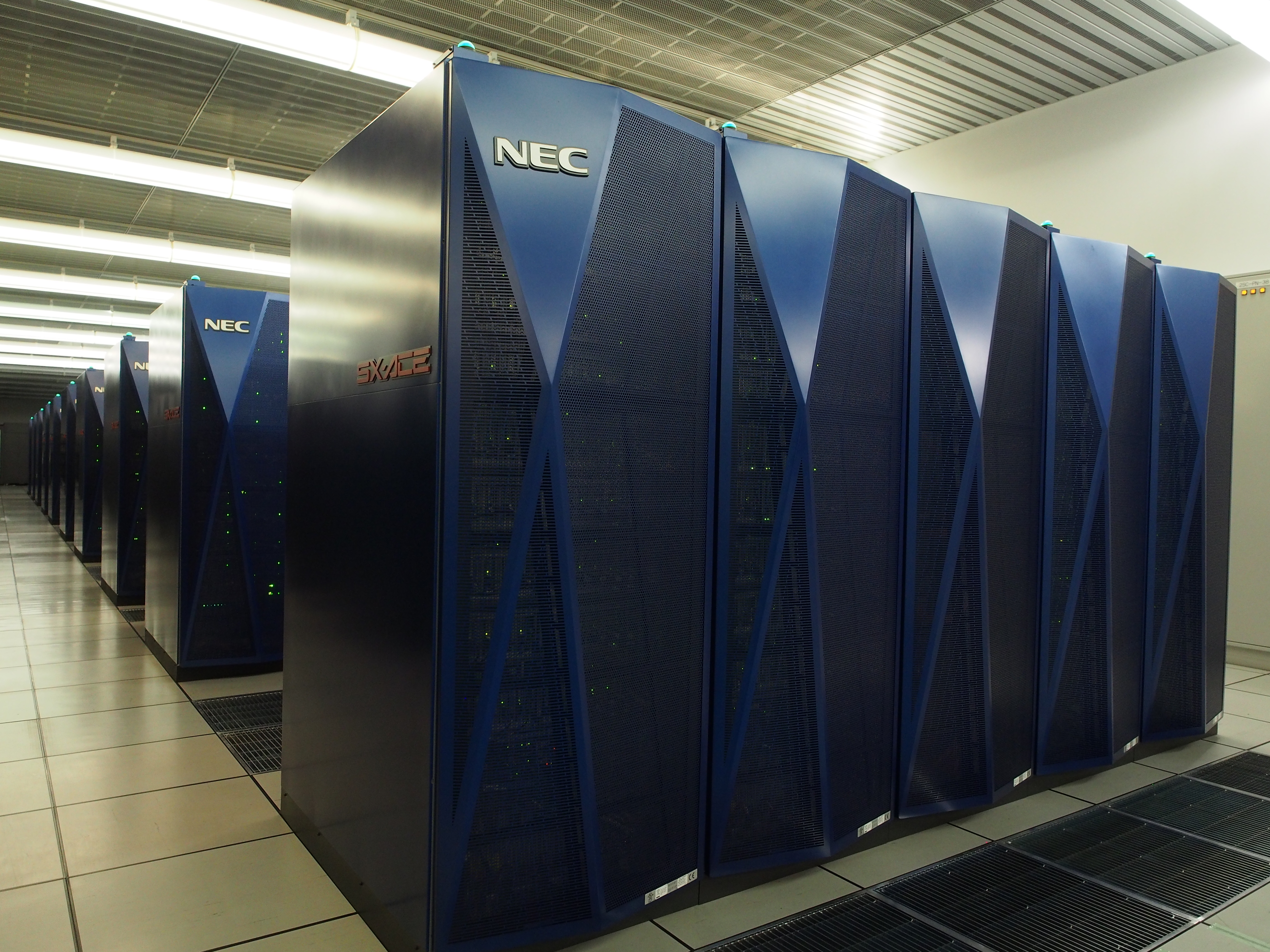
Earth Simulator 3

JAMSTEC currently owns the following vessels and vehicles for marine research:

- Research Vessels: RV Hakuhō Maru, RV Shinsei Maru, and RV Kaimei
- Support Vessel: RV Yokosuka
- Manned Deep Submergence Vehicle: DSV Shinkai 6500
- Deep Sea Scientific Drilling Vessel: Chikyū
- Deep Sea Cruising Autonomous Underwater Vehicles: AUV Urashima 8000, AUV Yumeiruka, AUV Jinbei, and AUV Otohime
- Remotely Operated Vehicles: Kaikō 7000 & 7000 II, Kaikō Mk-IV, Hyper-Dolphin, MR-X1, PICASSO, MROV, and REMUS 6000
- Deep Ocean Floor Survey System: Deep Tow
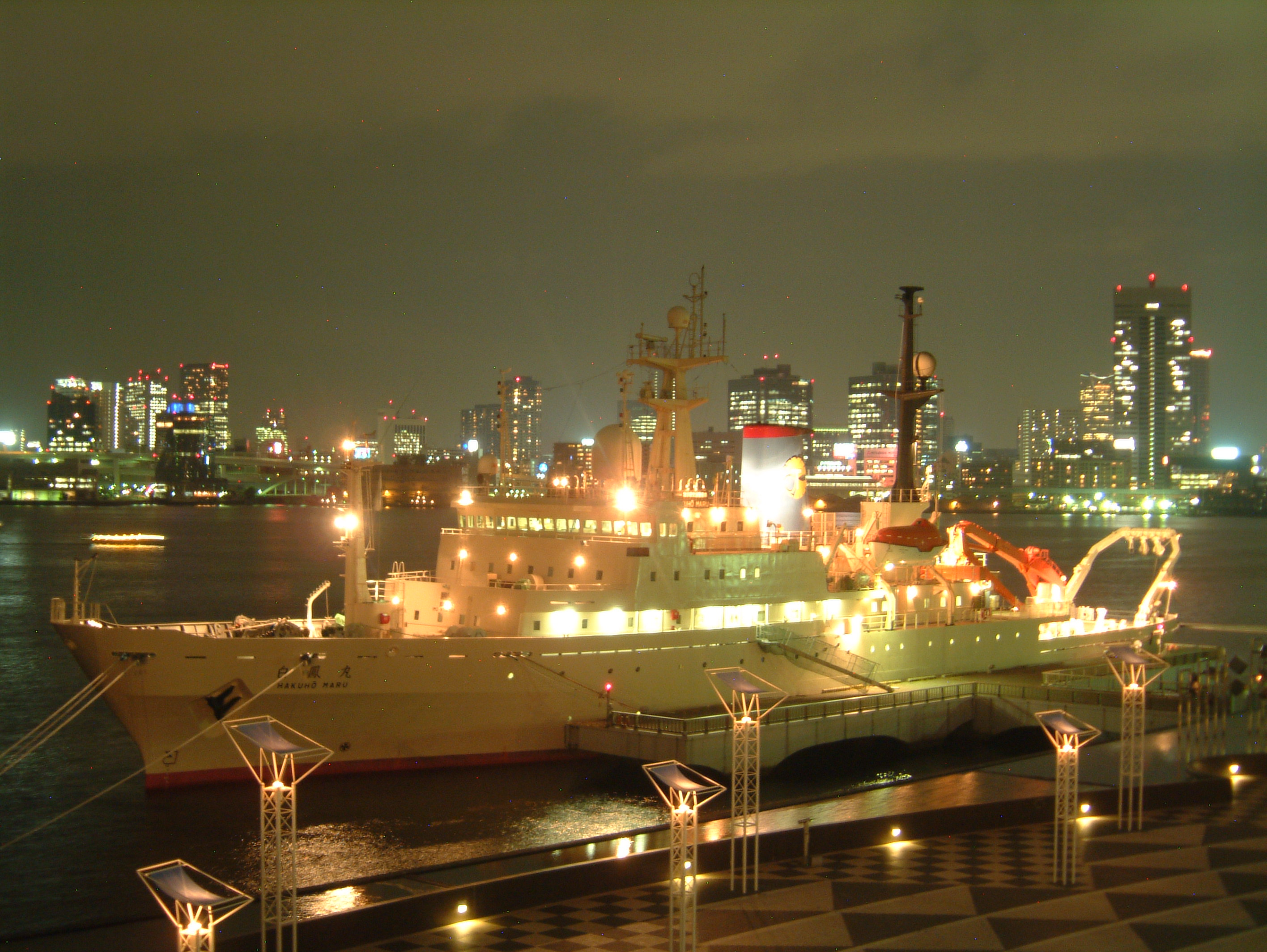
RV Hakuho Maru

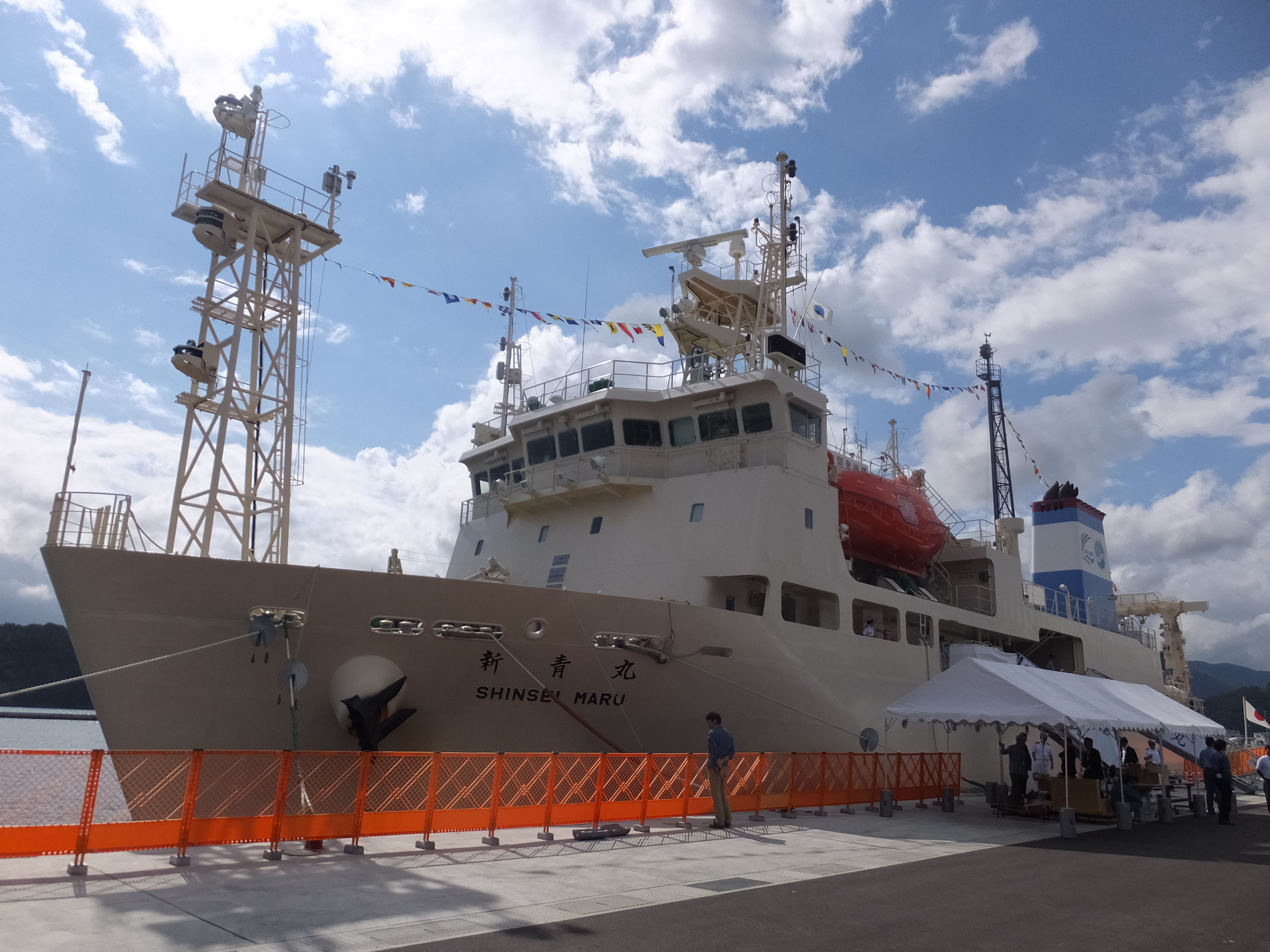
RV Shinsei Maru

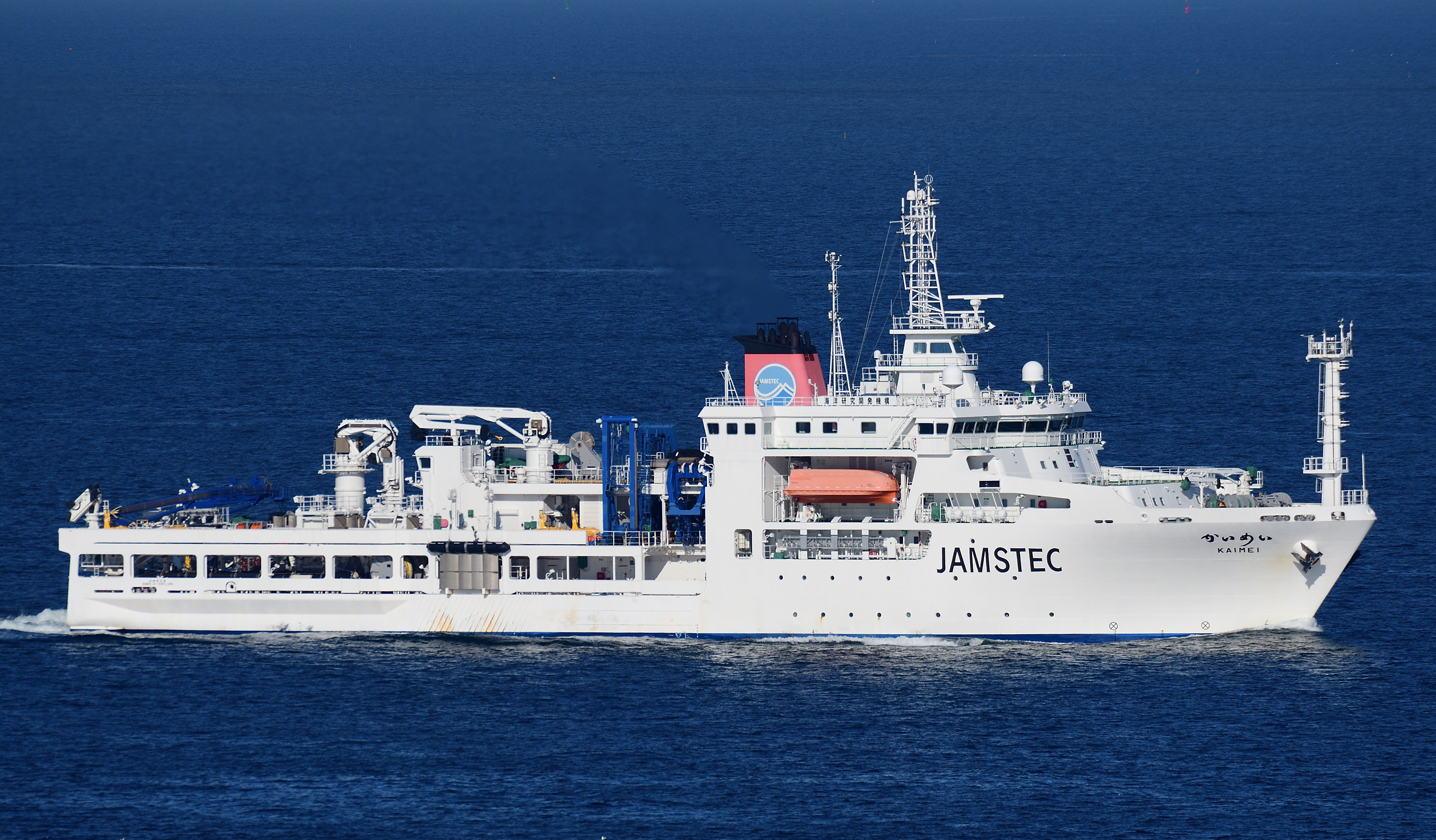
RV Kaimei

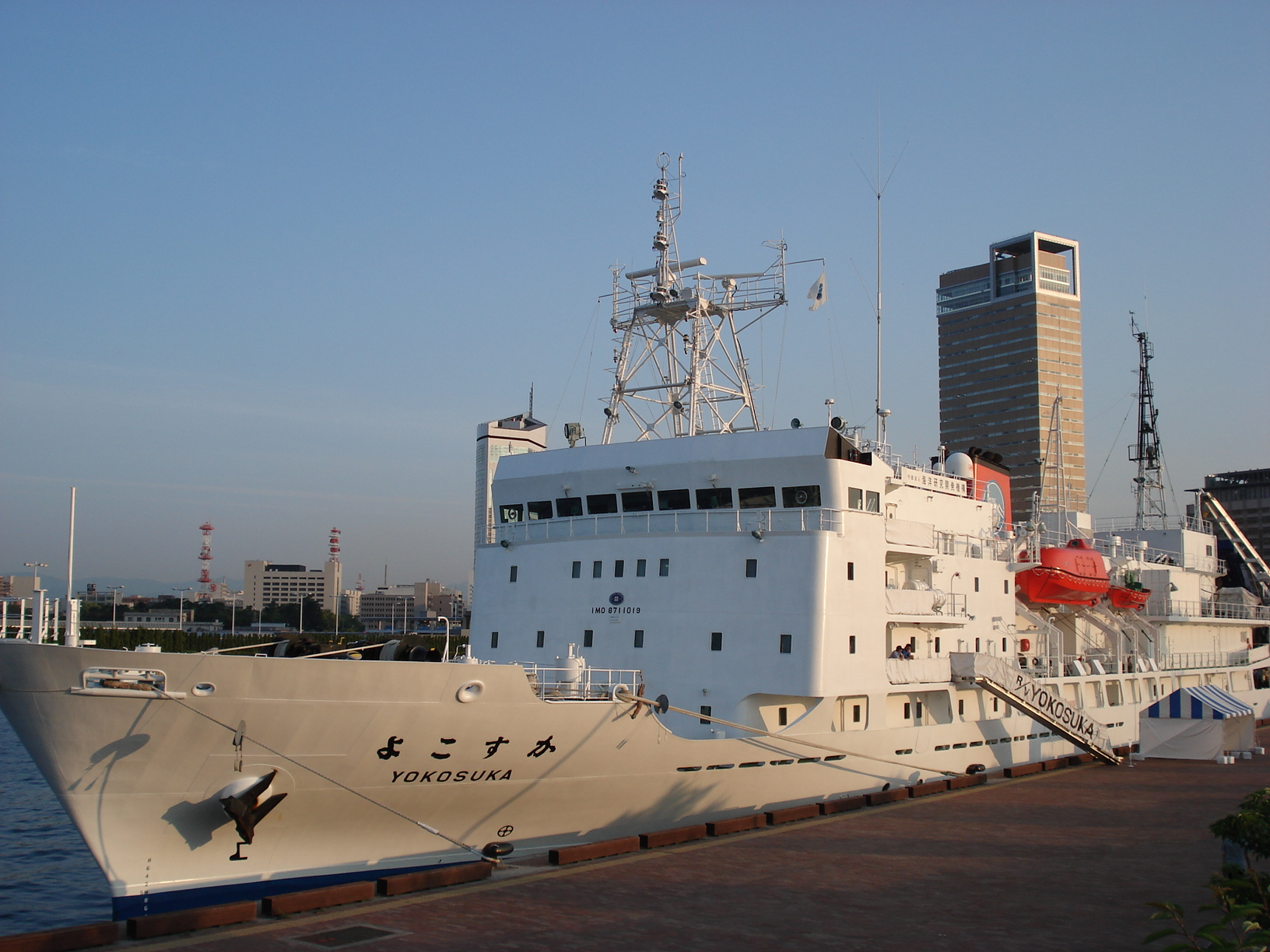
RV Yokosuka

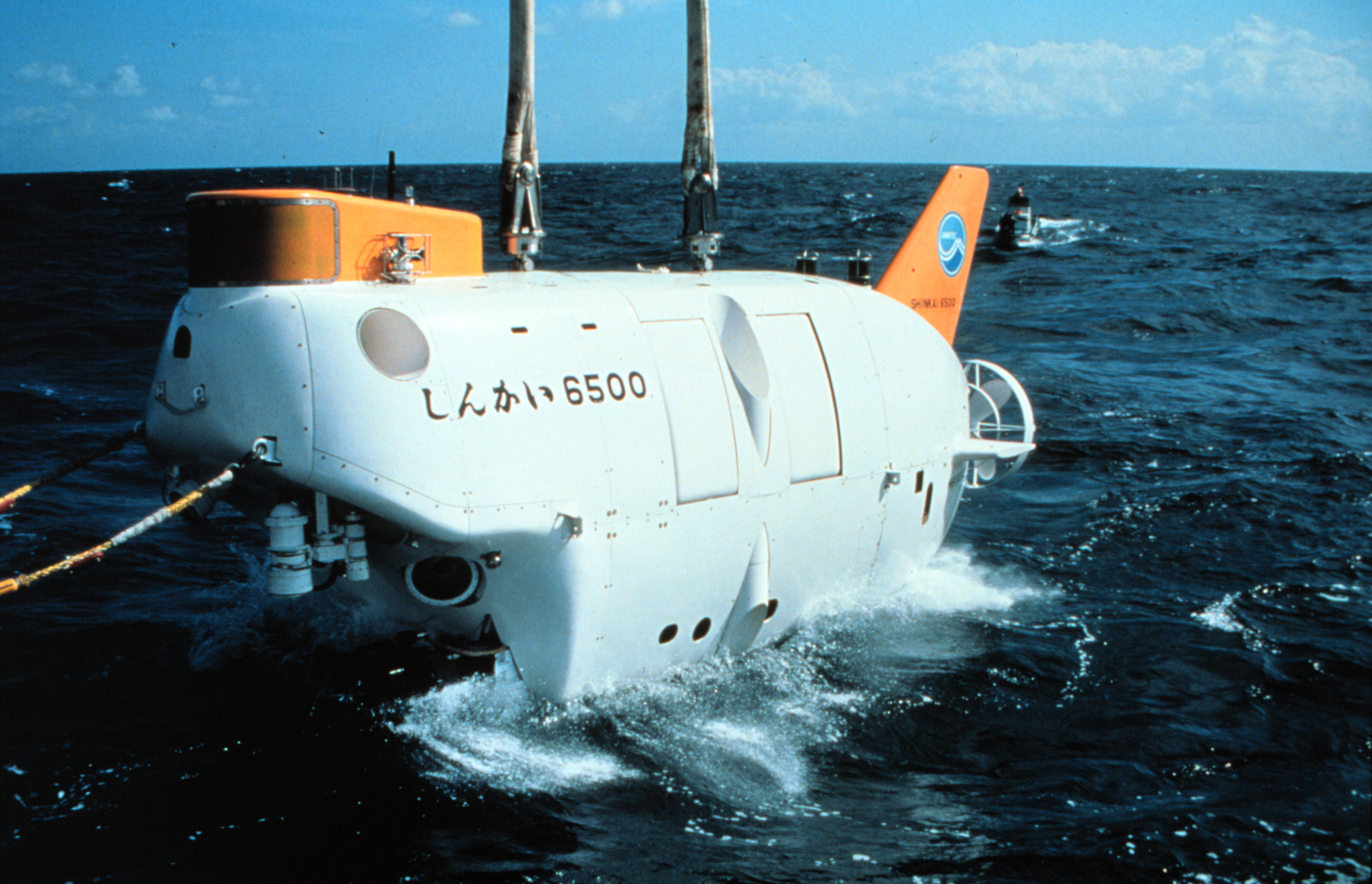
DSV Shinkai 6500

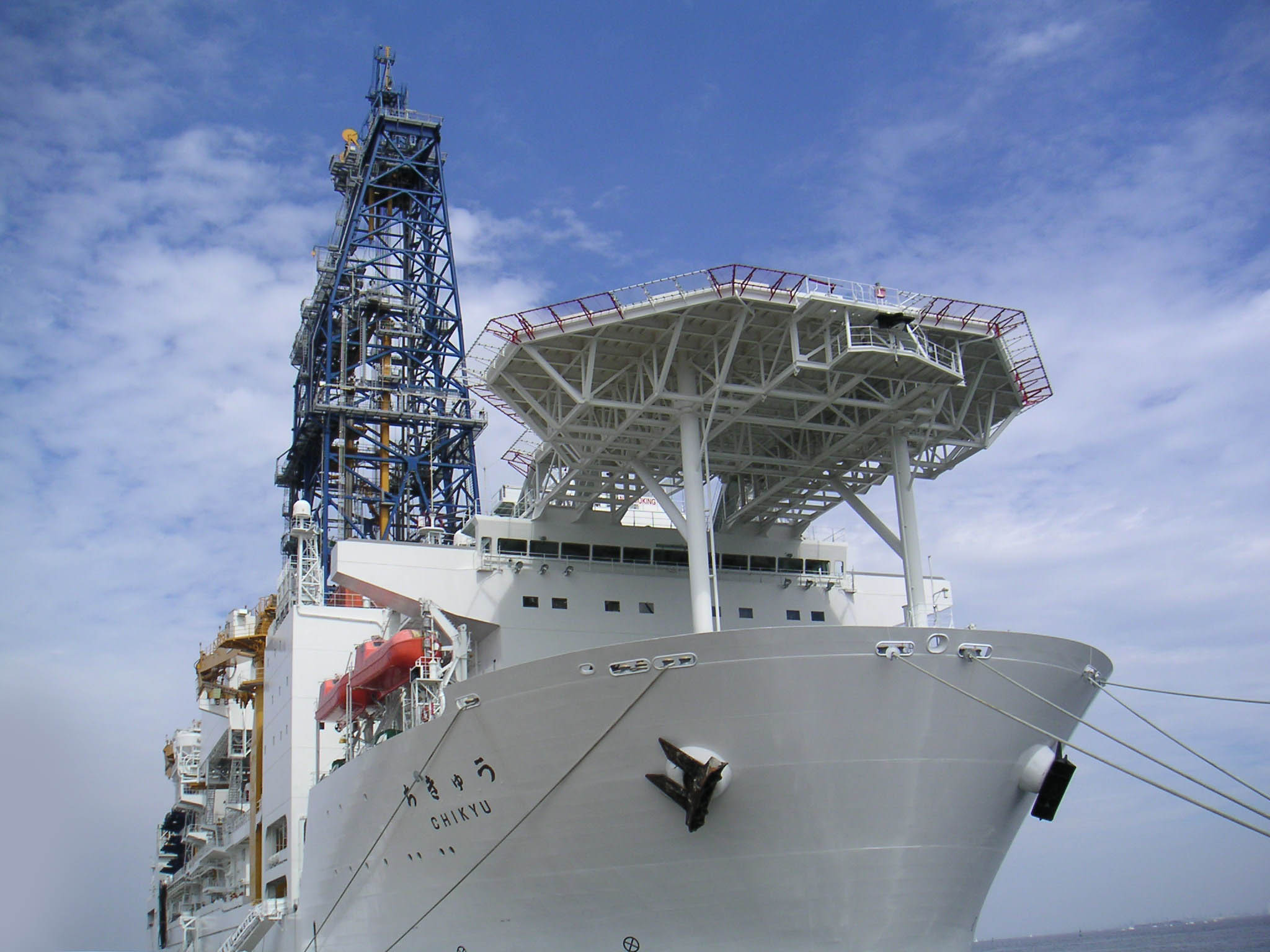
Chikyū

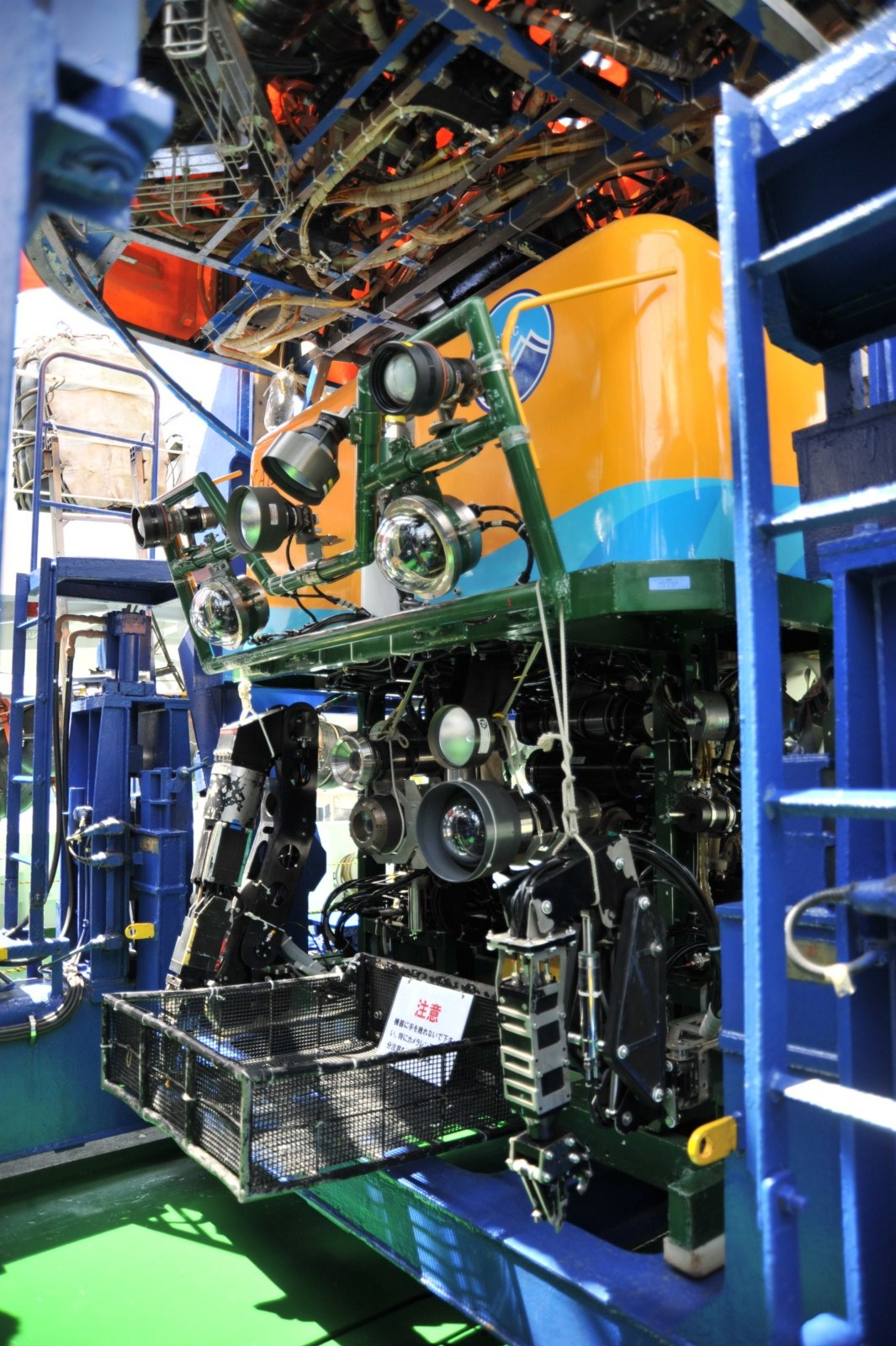
ROV Kaiko 7000Ⅱ

ROV Kaiko Mk-IV

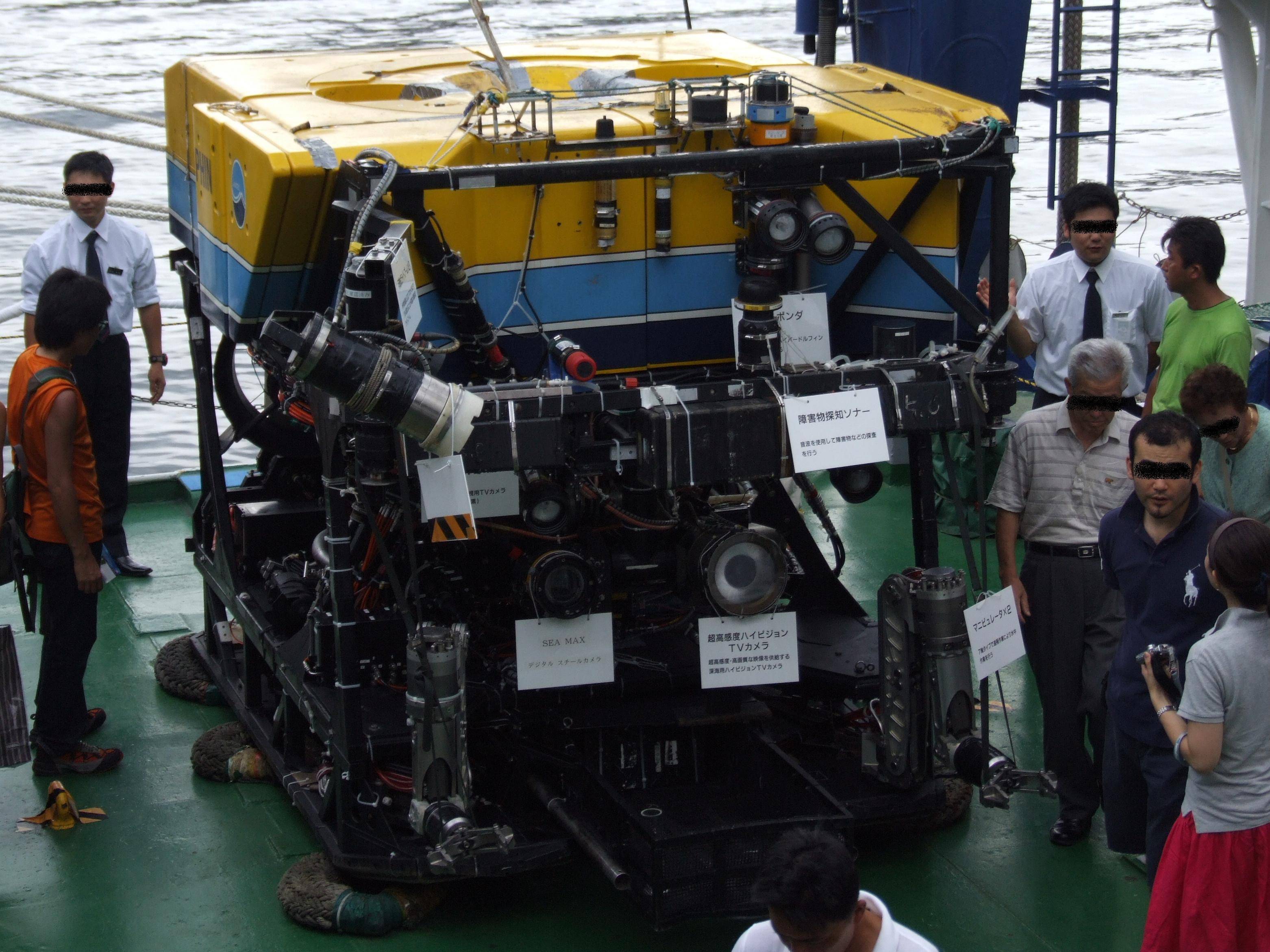
ROV Hyper-Dolphin

=== Retired vessels and vehicles ===
The following vessels and vehicles have retired from service.

- Research Vessels: RV Natsushima, RV Kaiyo, and RV Tansei Maru
- Deep Sea Research Vessel: RV Kairei
- Oceanographic Research Vessel: RV Mirai
- Manned Research Deep Submergence Vehicles: DSV Shinkai 2000
- Remotely Operated Vehicles: Dolphin-3K, Kaikō, and ABISMO
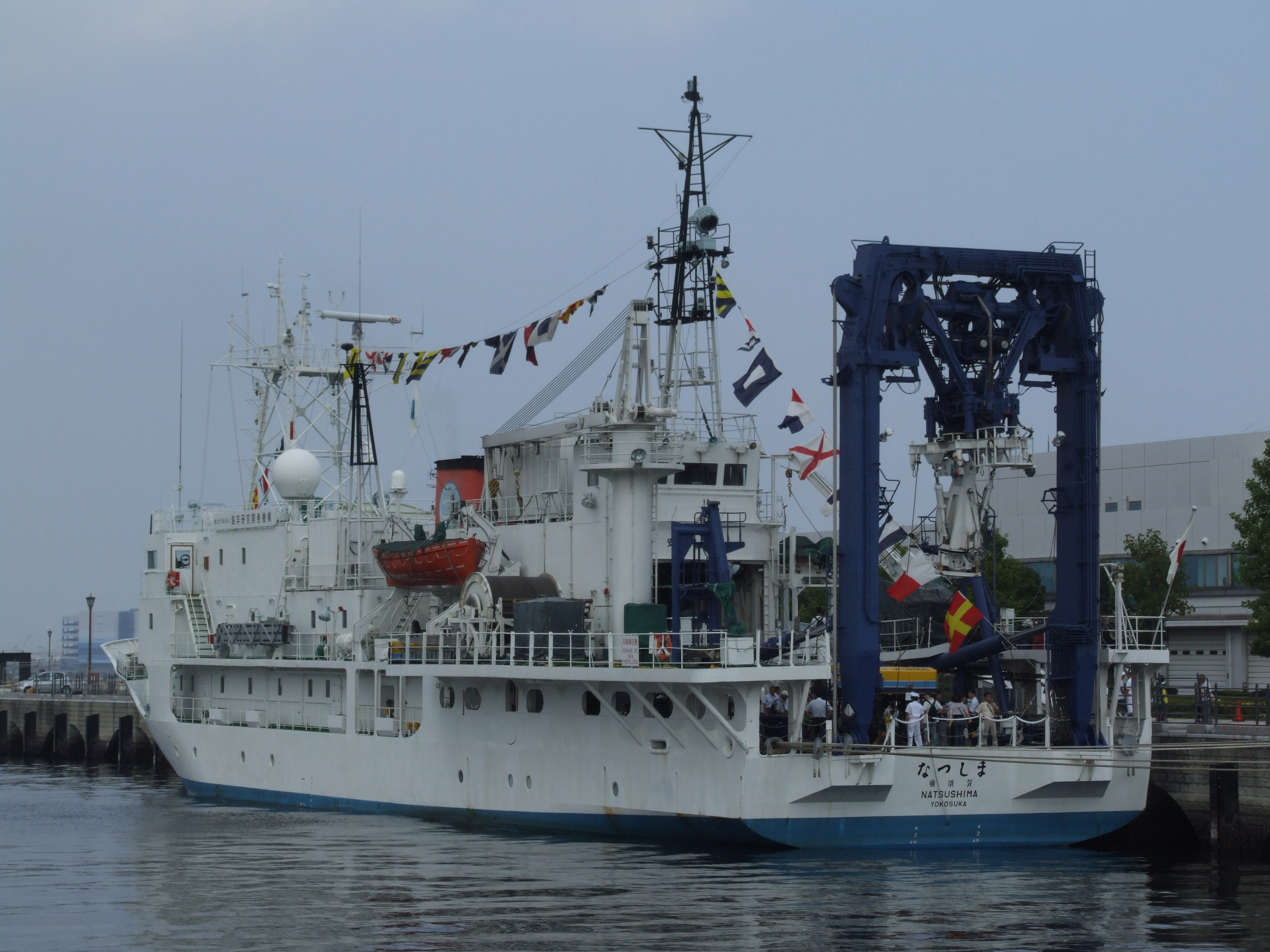
RV Natsushima

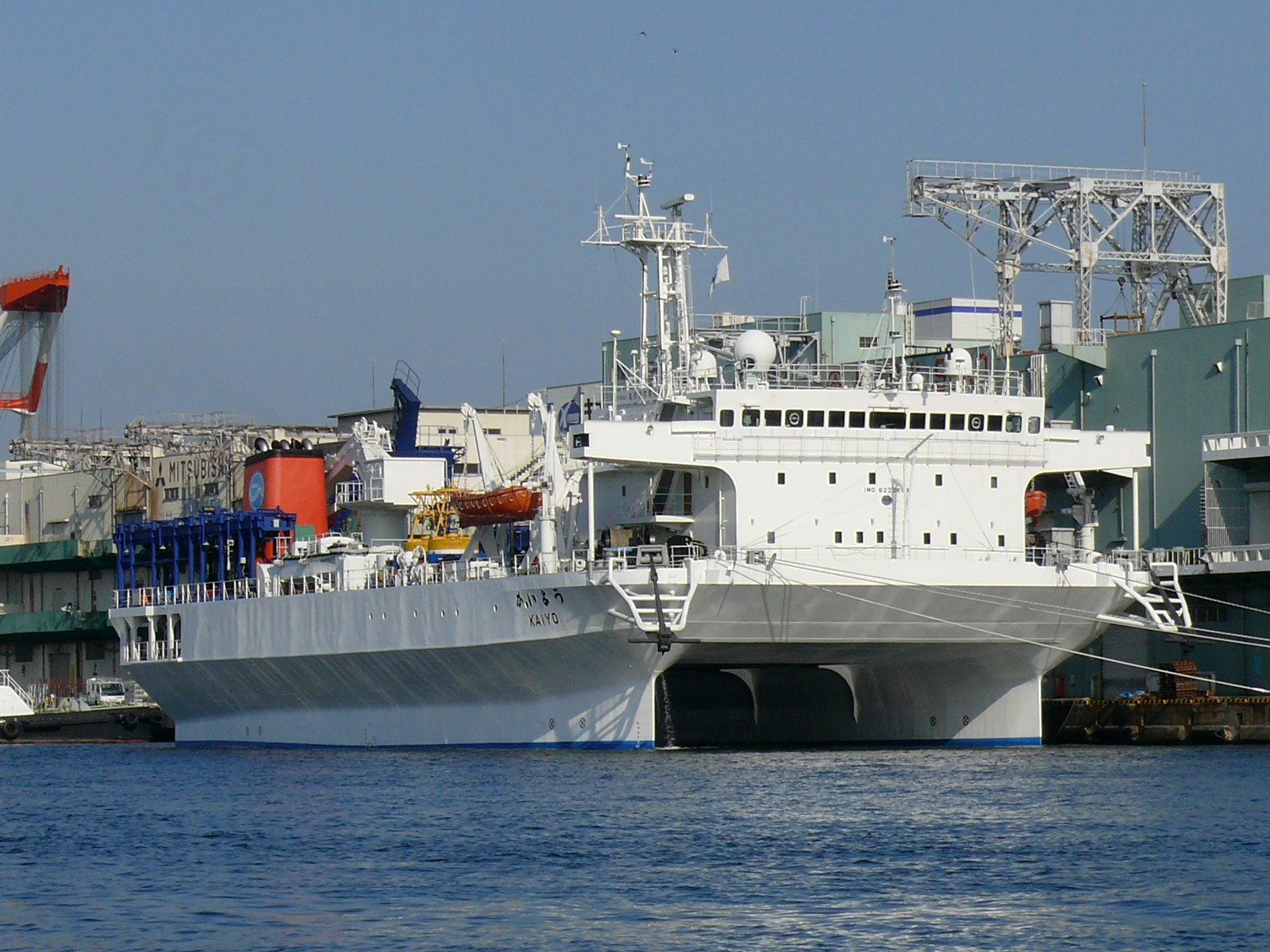
RV Kaiyo

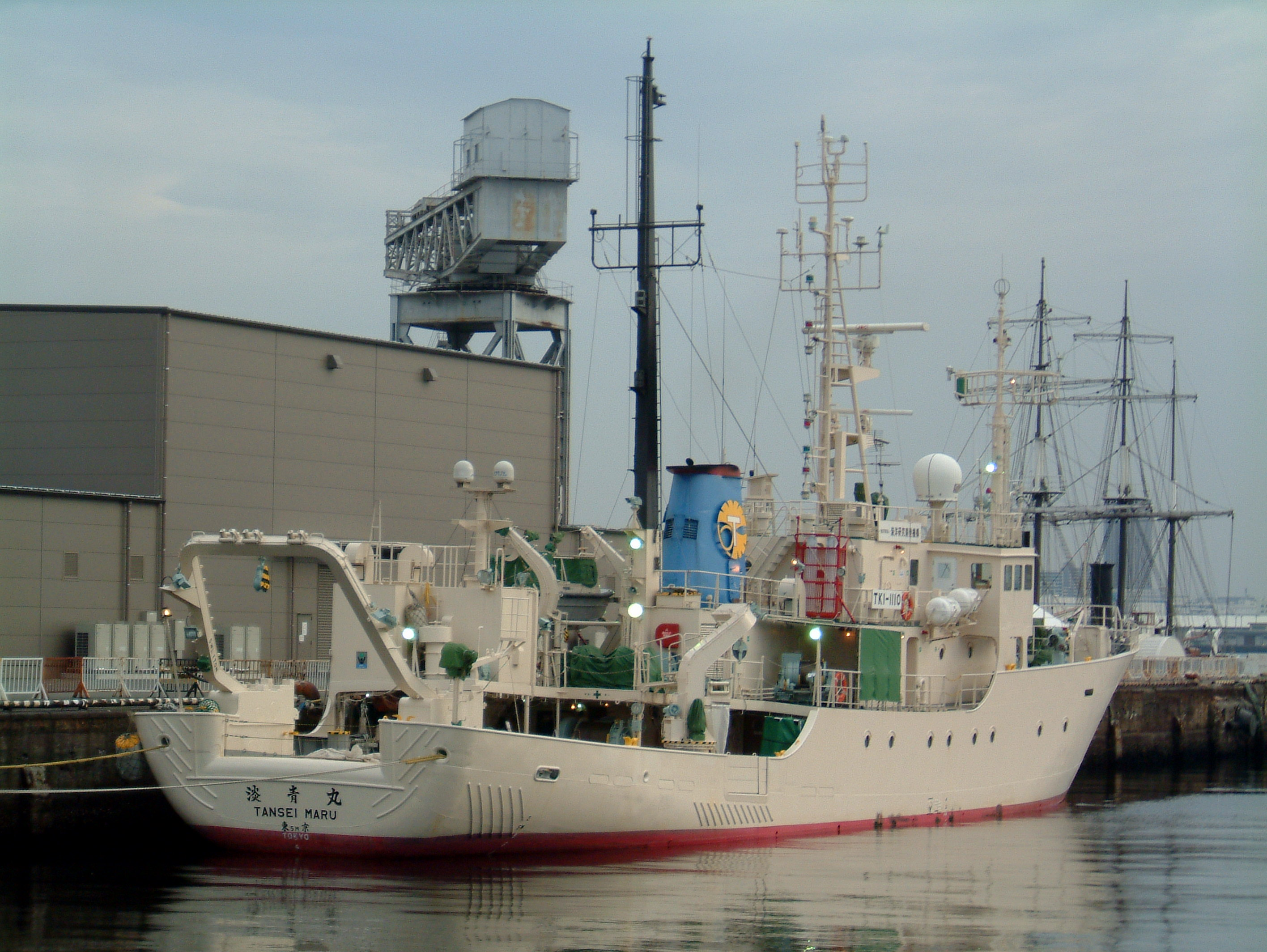
RV Tansei Maru

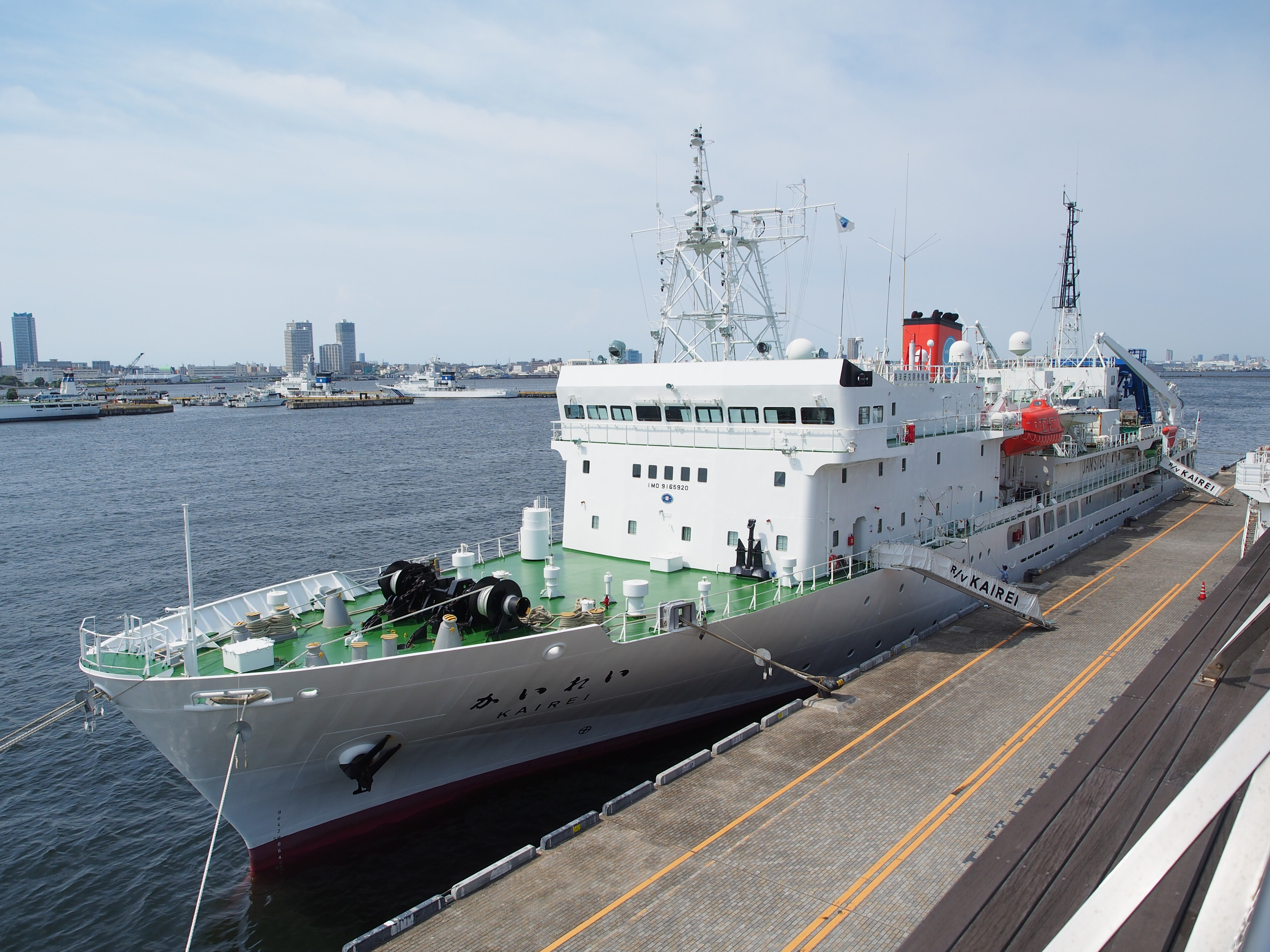
RV Kairei

RV Mirai

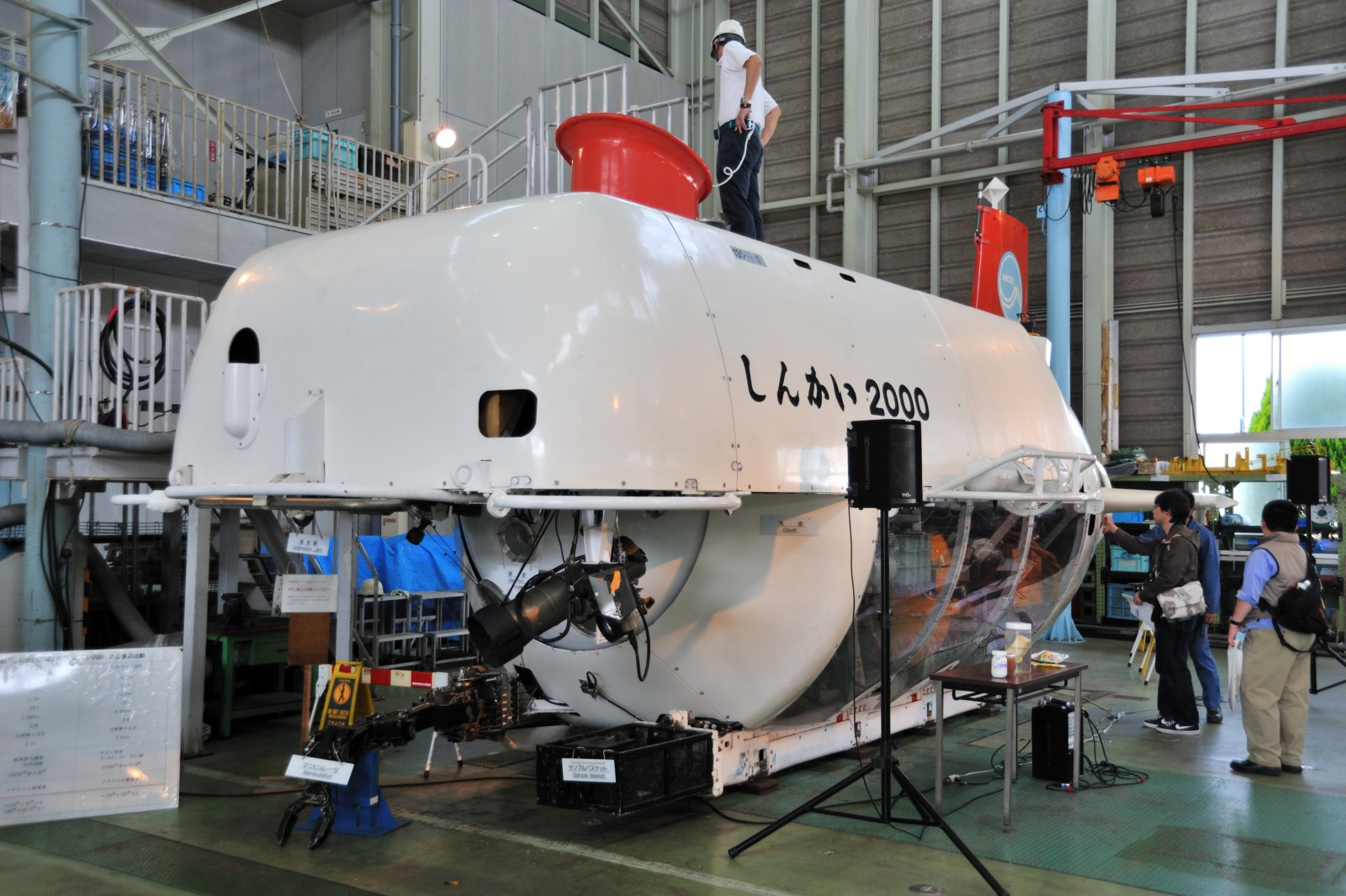
DSV Shinkai 2000

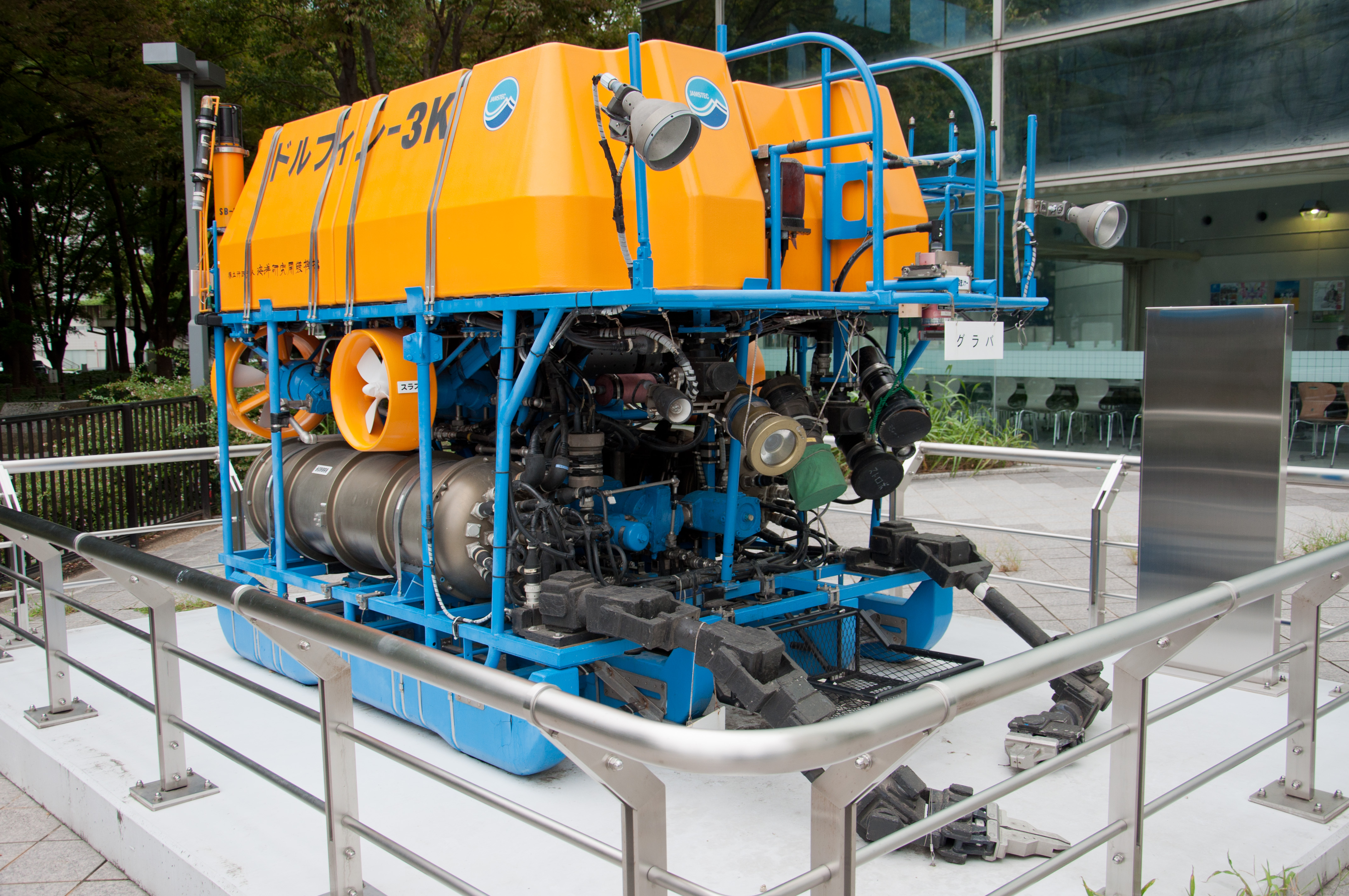
Dolphin-3K

=== Vessels under development ===
ARV Mirai II at Japan Marin United Isogo Shipyard in Yokohama (26 July 2025)

- Arctic Research Vessel: ARV Mirai II
- Manned Deep Submergence Vehicle: DSV Shinkai 12000

== Facilities ==
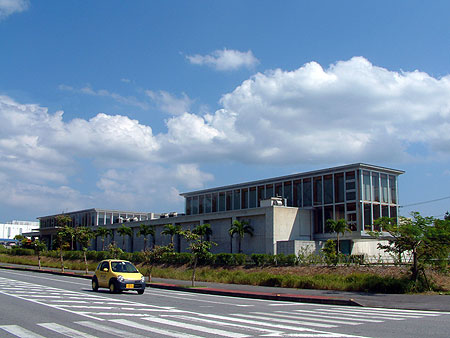
JAMSTEC Global Oceanographic Data Center (GODAC)

JAMSTEC is headquartered in Yokosuka and based in five other locations:

- Yokohama Institute for Earth Sciences (YES) in Yokohama.
- Mutsu Institute for Oceanography (MIO) in Mutsu, Aomori.
- Kochi Institute for Core Sample Research (KOCHI) in Kōchi.
- Global Oceanographic Data Center (GODAC) in Nago, Okinawa.
- Tokyo Office.

== See also ==
- Intergovernmental Oceanographic Commission (UNESCO)
- Taiwan Ocean Research Institute
