= Johnson Cann =

British geologist

- Born: 18 October 1937 (age 88)
- Education: University of Cambridge
- Scientific career
- Workplaces: University of Leeds; Newcastle University; University of East Anglia
- Thesis: The petrology of the S. Airde Beinn Plug, Northern Mull (1963)
- Doctoral students: Julian Pearce

Johnson Robin ('Joe') Cann FRS (born 18 October 1937) is a British geologist.

== Early life and education ==
Cann was educated at St Albans School, Hertfordshire and at St John's College, Cambridge, where he gained a first class BA in 1959 and an MA in 1961. He received a PhD at the Department of Earth Sciences at Cambridge in 1962, where he studied with Cecil Edgar Tilley. He subsequently remained at St John's College as a postdoctoral Research Fellow, but also had periods of study in the United States Office of Naval Research and as a Senior Scientific Officer in the Department of Mineralogy at the Natural History Museum, London.

== Academic career ==
Cann was appointed lecturer in the School of Environmental Science at the University of East Anglia (UEA) in 1965. He was promoted to Reader in 1973 but left shortly afterwards to become J B Simpson Professor of Geology at the University of Newcastle upon Tyne.

Following a reorganisation of Earth Sciences in British universities resulting from the 1987 University Grants Committee's report Strengthening University Earth Sciences, Cann moved to the University of Leeds where he was Chairman of the School of Earth Sciences from 1989 to 1995. Whilst Professor at Leeds he also held a visiting position as an Adjunct Scientist at the Woods Hole Oceanographic Institution in the United States. In 1987 he instigated, and subsequently led, the Natural Environment Research Council's British Mid-Ocean Ridge Initiative (BRIDGE), a major UK investigation of the creation of the Earth's crust in the deep oceans.

== Honours ==
For his contributions to research Cann was awarded the degree of ScD in 1984, the Murchison Medal of the Geological Society of London in 1990 and was elected Fellow of the Royal Society (FRS) in 1995.
