= ABISMO =

Japanese remotely operated underwater vehicle for deep sea exploration

History

Japan
- Name: ABISMO
- Owner: The Japan Agency for Marine-Earth Science and Technology (JAMSTEC)
- Operator: JAMSTEC
- Builder: JAMSTEC
- Maiden voyage: 2007
- In service: 2007
- Home port: Yokosuka, Japan

General characteristics
- Type: remotely operated underwater vehicle
- Tonnage: 300kg in the air
- Displacement: 100kg in the water
- Length: 1.3 m (4 ft 3 in)
- Height: 1.1 m (3 ft 7 in)
- Installed power: electrical (Lithium-ion batteries)
- Propulsion: Thrusters (Longitudinal direction: 400W×4 sets, Transverse direction: 400W×2 sets), Crawler (Longitudinal direction 400W×2sets)
- Test depth: 11,000 meters
- Complement: Uncrewed
- Sensors & processing systems: side-scan sonar, NTSC type color TV×1channel & search lights

ABISMO (Automatic Bottom Inspection and Sampling Mobile) is a remotely operated underwater vehicle (ROV) built by the Japan Agency for Marine-Earth Science and Technology (JAMSTEC) for exploration of the deep sea. It is the only remaining ROV rated to 11,000-meters (after Nereus, built and operated by the Woods Hole Oceanographic Institution was lost at sea in 2014), ABISMO is intended to be the permanent replacement for Kaikō, a ROV that was lost at sea in 2003.

== Kaikō ==
Between 1995 and 2003, Kaikō conducted more than 250 dives, collecting 350 biological species (including 180 different bacteria), some of which could prove to be useful in medical and industrial applications. Kaikō reached a maximum depth of 10,911.4 meters at the Challenger Deep on 24 March 1995, during its initial sea trials. Kaikō returned to Challenger Deep in February 1996, this time reaching a maximum depth of 10,898 meters. Kaikō made its last visit to Challenger Deep in May 1998. On 29 May 2003, Kaikō was lost at sea off the coast of Shikoku Island during Typhoon Chan-Hom, when a steel secondary cable connecting it to its launcher at the ocean surface broke. In May 2004, JAMSTEC resumed its research operations, using a converted ROV as its vehicle. This ROV, formerly known as UROV 7K, was rechristened Kaikō 7000 II. The 7000 designation indicates that this vessel is rated for diving to a maximum depth of 7,000 meters.

== RV Kairei ==
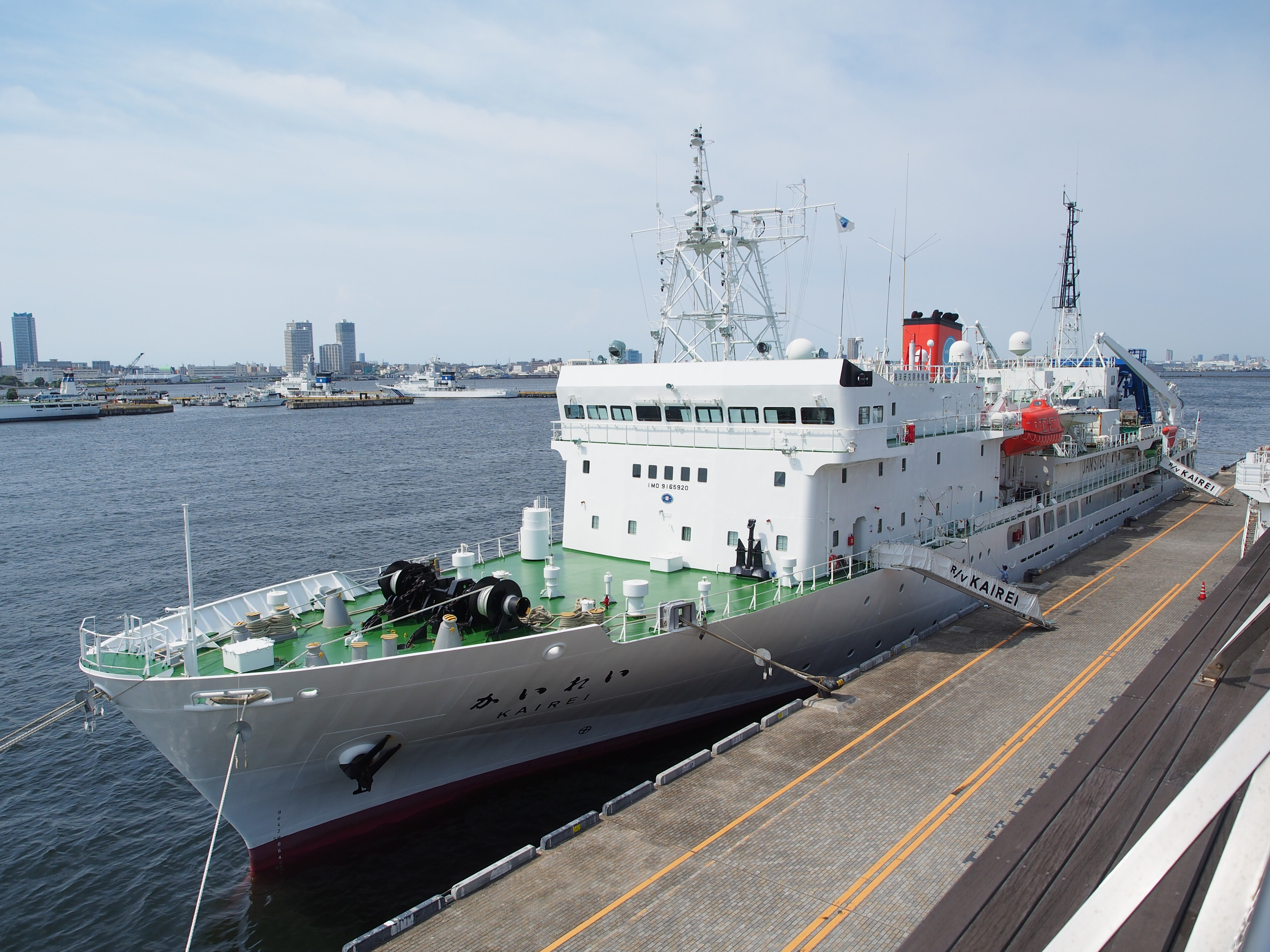
RV Kairei

RV Kairei is a deep sea research vessel that served as the support ship for Kaikō, and for its replacement ROV, Kaikō 7000 II. It now serves as the support ship for ABISMO. Kairei uses ABISMO to conduct surveys and observations of oceanic plateaus, abyssal plains, oceanic basins, submarine volcanoes, hydrothermal vents, oceanic trenches and other underwater terrain features to a maximum depth of 11,000 meters. Kairei also conducts surveys of the structure of deep sub-bottoms with complicated geographical shapes in subduction zones using its on-board multi-channel reflection survey system.

== Development of ABISMO ==
While the temporary replacement ROV (Kaikō 7000 II) has a remarkable performance record, it is only rated to 7,000 meters and cannot reach the deepest oceanic trenches. For this reason, JAMSTEC engineers began work on a new 11,000-meter class ROV in April 2005. The project is called ABISMO (Automatic Bottom Inspection and Sampling Mobile), which translates to abyss in Spanish and Portuguese.

Like Kaikō, ABISMO consists of 4 major parts:

1. electronic instruments aboard RV Kairei, the support ship
2. Launcher (a sampling station)
3. Vehicle (a sediment probe)
4. Samplers (a gravity corer or Smith Macintyre type sampler)

Except for the sampler and the smaller size of the ROV itself, the system configuration is the same as for Kaikō. The launcher launches and recovers the ROV along with its sampler. Click here to see a photograph of ABISMO and its launcher, as well as RV Kairei, the support ship.

The lower part of the launcher is constructed of a stainless steel framework, within which the vehicle is stored. Pressure hulls for electronic devices, a winch, a secondary cable drum and two electric transformers are located in the upper part of the launcher. The samplers include a gravity core sampler and a bottom grab sampler. There is also a docking system and an acoustic positioning system in the lower part of the launcher. The vehicle is hung in the launcher by the docking system. When the system detaches it and the cable drum feeds the secondary cable, the vehicle can dive down, and its position is measured by the acoustic positioning system. The position of the launcher is measured by RV Kairei, the support ship. The launcher also has a high-definition television (HDTV) camera with pan and tilt functions.

Initial sea trials of ABISMO were conducted in 2007. The craft successfully reached a planned depth of 9,760-meters, the deepest part of Izu–Ogasawara Trench, where it collected core samples of sediment from the seabed. Plans are underway for a mission to the Challenger Deep.

In June 2008, the Japan Agency for Marine-Earth Science and Technology (JAMSTEC) deployed the 4,517-ton Deep Sea Research Vessel Kairei to the area of Guam for cruise KR08-05 Leg 1 and Leg 2. On 1–3 June 2008, during Leg 1, the Japanese robotic deep-sea probe ABISMO (Automatic Bottom Inspection and Sampling Mobile) on dives 11-13 almost reached the bottom about 150 km (93 mi) east of the Challenger Deep: "Unfortunately, we were unable to dive to the sea floor because the legacy primary cable of the Kaiko system was a little bit short. The 2-m long gravity core sampler was dropped in free fall, and sediment samples of 1.6m length were obtained. Twelve bottles of water samples were also obtained at various depths..." ABISMO's dive #14 was into the TOTO caldera (12°42.7777 N, 143°32.4055 E), about 60 nmi northeast of the deepest waters of the central basin of the Challenger Deep, where they obtained videos of the hydrothermal plume. Upon successful testing to 10,000 m (32,808 ft), JAMSTEC' ROV ABISMO became, briefly, the only full-ocean-depth rated ROV in existence. On 31 May 2009, the ABISMO was joined by the Woods Hole Oceanographic Institution's HROV Nereus as the only two operational full ocean depth capable remotely operated vehicles in existence. During the ROV ABISMO's deepest sea trails dive its manometer measured a depth of 10,257 m (33,652 ft) ±3 m (10 ft) in "Area 1" (vicinity of 12°43' N, 143°33' E). Leg 2, under chief scientist Takashi Murashima, operated at the Challenger Deep June 8–9, 2008, testing JAMSTEC's new full ocean depth "Free Fall Mooring System", i.e. a lander. The lander was successfully tested twice to 10,895 m (35,745 ft) depth, taking video images and sediment samplings at 11°22.14′N 142°25.76′E, in the central basin of the Challenger Deep.

== See also ==
- Autonomous underwater vehicle – Uncrewed underwater vehicle with autonomous guidance system
- Bathymetry – Study of underwater depth of lake or ocean floors
- Deep sea – Lowest layer in the ocean
- Deep-submergence vehicle – Self-propelled deep-diving crewed submersible
- Diving chamber – Hyperbaric pressure vessel for human occupancy used in diving operations
- Explorer AUV – Autonomous underwater vehicle from People's Republic of China
- Kaikō ROV – Japanese remotely operated underwater vehicle for deep sea exploration
- DSV Limiting Factor – Crewed full ocean depth rated submersible
- Sea Pole-class bathyscaphe – Chinese bathyscaphe class
- DSV Shinkai – Crewed research submersible
- Timeline of diving technology – Chronological list of notable events in the history of underwater diving equipment
