= Roger Clive Searle =

British geophysicist

Roger Clive Searle (born 24 October 1944 in St Ives, Huntingdonshire, died 26 November 2024, Northumberland) was an English geophysicist, known for using sonar imaging in research on the geology and geophysics of the ocean floor. In particular, he has made important contributions to understanding the oceanic spreading system and the mid-ocean spreading centres.

== Biography ==
Searle graduated from the University of Cambridge with a B.A. (with a major in physics) in 1966 and an M.A. in 1970. He received a PhD in geophysics from the University of Newcastle upon Tyne in 1969. From 1970 to 1973 he was an assistant professor at Haile Selassie University in Addis Ababa. At the Institute of Oceanographic Sciences in Wormsley Park, Searle was a senior science officer from 1973 to 1978; a principal science officer, civil service grade 7, from 1978 to 1988; and a senior principal science officer, civil service grade 6 (Individual Merit), from 1988 to 1989. At the University of Durham, he was a professor of geophysics from 1989 until his retirement in 2011 as professor emeritus. During his professorship he supervised eleven doctoral students. He served as department head from 1990 to 1993 and from 1998 to 2002. He was from 1982 to 1983 a visiting scientist at the Scripps Institute of Oceanography and in 2003 a guest investigator at Woods Hole Oceanographic Institution.

Searle was a marine geophysicist with an international reputation. He was the author or co-author of more than 130 peer-reviewed scientific articles. He gave invited keynote talks in 2002 in Italy, in 2002 in France and China, from 2003 to 2011 in the US and the UK, in 2008 in India, and in 2012 in China and the USA. He participated in 37 research cruises, including 18 as principal or co-principal scientist (i.e. leader or co-leader of the science team aboard the cruise). He was the principal scientist for the 1979 cruise of the RRS Discovery in the Gulf of Aden and the Red Sea and for the 2007 inaugural research cruise of the RRS James Cook.

Searle was known as a leading pioneer in the processing and use of the GLORIA sidescan sonar system, developed in the UK. In the 1970s and the 1980s he used sidescan sonar and topographic analysis to define plate boundaries at subkilometre resolution and did research on propagating rifts and oceanic microplates (such as the Azores Microplate). Later in his career, he studied the effects of mantle hot spots on plate accretion and, with co-workers, found some of the first evidence that extreme asymmetry can occur in short-term plate accretion. He did important research on seamount morphology and origin, the geodynamics of oceanic core complexes, and ultra-slow rates in seafloor spreading.

He served from 1984 to 1987 as geophysical editor for the Journal of the Geological Society of London and from 1986 to 1992 as joint editor for the journal Marine Geophysical Researches. He became a member of the British Mid-Ocean Ridge Initiative (The BRIDGE programme), funded by the Natural Environment Research Council (NERC). One of the triumphs of the BRIDGE programme was mapping the bathymetry of the Reykjanes Ridge. From 1992 to 1994 he was a member of the steering committee of BRIDGE. From 1994 to 1996 he chaired InterRidge.

Searle had the support in 2003 of a Leverhulme Study Abroad Fellowship and from 2010 to 2012 a Leverhulme Emeritus Fellowship. He was awarded in 2011 the Price Medal of the Royal Astronomical Society. He was elected in 2012 a Fellow of the American Geophysical Union.

In September 1969 in Durham, he married Margery Joan McGuckin. They have three sons.

== Selected publications ==
=== Articles ===
- Searle, R. C. (1970). "Evidence from Gravity Anomalies for Thinning of the Lithosphere beneath the Rift Valley in Kenya". Geophysical Journal International. 21 (1): 13–31. Bibcode:1970GeoJ...21...13S. doi:10.1111/j.1365-246X.1970.tb01764.x.
- Searle, Roger; Gouin, Pierre (1972). "A gravity survey of the central part of the Ethiopian Rift valley". Tectonophysics. 15 (1–2): 41–52. Bibcode:1972Tectp..15...41S. doi:10.1016/0040-1951(72)90048-0.
- Searle, R. C. (1976). "Lithospheric Structure of the Azores Plateau from Rayleigh-Wave Dispersion". Geophysical Journal International. 44 (3): 537–546. Bibcode:1976GeoJ...44..537S. doi:10.1111/j.1365-246X.1976.tb00291.x. S2CID 130983733.
- Searle, R. C.; Whitmarsh, R. B. (1978). "The structure of King's Trough, Northeast Atlantic, from bathymetric, seismic and gravity studies". Geophysical Journal International. 53 (2): 259–287. Bibcode:1978GeoJ...53..259S. doi:10.1111/j.1365-246X.1978.tb03742.x. S2CID 140616409.
- Whitmarsh, R. B.; Ginzburg, A.; Searle, R. C. (1982). "The structure and origin of the Azores--Biscay Rise, North-east Atlantic Ocean". Geophysical Journal International. 70 (1): 79–107. Bibcode:1982GeoJ...70...79W. doi:10.1111/j.1365-246X.1982.tb06393.x.
- Searle, R.C. (1983). "Submarine central volcanoes on the Nazca Plate — High-resolution sonar observations". Marine Geology. 53 (1–2): 77–102. Bibcode:1983MGeol..53...77S. doi:10.1016/0025-3227(83)90035-X.
- Kleinrock, Martin C.; Searle, Roger C.; Hey, R. N. (1989). "Tectonics of the failing spreading system associated with the 95.5°W Galapagos propagator". Journal of Geophysical Research: Solid Earth. 94 (B10): 13839–13857. Bibcode:1989JGR....9413839K. doi:10.1029/JB094iB10p13839.
- Holcomb, Robin T.; Searle, Roger C. (1991). "Large landslides from oceanic volcanoes". Marine Geotechnology. 10 (1–2): 19–32. doi:10.1080/10641199109379880.
- Searle, R.C.; Francheteau, J.; Cornaglia, B. (1995). "New observations on mid-plate volcanism and the tectonic history of the Pacific plate, Tahiti to Easter microplate". Earth and Planetary Science Letters. 131 (3–4): 395–421. Bibcode:1995E&PSL.131..395S. doi:10.1016/0012-821X(95)00018-8.
- Searle, R.C; Keeton, J.A; Owens, R.B; White, R.S; Mecklenburgh, R.; Parsons, B.; Lee, S.M (1998). "The Reykjanes Ridge: Structure and tectonics of a hot-spot-influenced, slow-spreading ridge, from multibeam bathymetry, gravity and magnetic investigations". Earth and Planetary Science Letters. 160 (3–4): 463–478. Bibcode:1998E&PSL.160..463S. doi:10.1016/S0012-821X(98)00104-6.
- Bird, Robert T.; Naar, David F.; Larson, Roger L.; Searle, Roger C.; Scotese, Christopher R. (1998). "Plate tectonic reconstructions of the Juan Fernandez microplate: Transformation from internal shear to rigid rotation". Journal of Geophysical Research: Solid Earth. 103 (B4): 7049–7067. Bibcode:1998JGR...103.7049B. doi:10.1029/97JB02133.
- Escartín, J.; Cowie, P. A.; Searle, R. C.; Allerton, S.; Mitchell, N. C.; MacLeod, C. J.; Slootweg, A. P. (1999). "Quantifying tectonic strain and magmatic accretion at a slow spreading ridge segment, Mid-Atlantic Ridge, 29°N". Journal of Geophysical Research: Solid Earth. 104 (B5): 10421–10437. Bibcode:1999JGR...10410421E. doi:10.1029/1998JB900097.
- Searle, R. C.; Cannat, M.; Fujioka, K.; Mével, C.; Fujimoto, H.; Bralee, A.; Parson, L. (2003). "FUJI Dome: A large detachment fault near 64°E on the very slow-spreading southwest Indian Ridge" (PDF). Geochemistry, Geophysics, Geosystems. 4 (8): 9105. Bibcode:2003GGG.....4.9105S. doi:10.1029/2003GC000519. S2CID 54028434.
- Allen, Mark B.; Anderson, Lester; Searle, Roger C.; Buslov, Misha (2006). "Oblique rift geometry of the West Siberian Basin: Tectonic setting for the Siberian flood basalts" (PDF). Journal of the Geological Society. 163 (6): 901–904. Bibcode:2006JGSoc.163..901A. doi:10.1144/0016-76492006-096. S2CID 130213654.
- MacLeod, C.J.; Searle, R.C.; Murton, B.J.; Casey, J.F.; Mallows, C.; Unsworth, S.C.; Achenbach, K.L.; Harris, M. (2009). "Life cycle of oceanic core complexes". Earth and Planetary Science Letters. 287 (3–4): 333–344. Bibcode:2009E&PSL.287..333M. doi:10.1016/j.epsl.2009.08.016.
- Morris, A.; Gee, J.S.; Pressling, N.; John, B.E.; MacLeod, C.J.; Grimes, C.B.; Searle, R.C. (2009). "Footwall rotation in an oceanic core complex quantified using reoriented Integrated Ocean Drilling Program core samples". Earth and Planetary Science Letters. 287 (1–2): 217–228. Bibcode:2009E&PSL.287..217M. doi:10.1016/j.epsl.2009.08.007.
- Searle, R.C.; Murton, B.J.; Achenbach, K.; Lebas, T.; Tivey, M.; Yeo, I.; Cormier, M.H.; Carlut, J.; Ferreira, P.; Mallows, C.; Morris, K.; Schroth, N.; Van Calsteren, P.; Waters, C. (2010). "Structure and development of an axial volcanic ridge: Mid-Atlantic Ridge, 45°N". Earth and Planetary Science Letters. 299 (1–2): 228–241. Bibcode:2010E&PSL.299..228S. doi:10.1016/j.epsl.2010.09.003.
- Yeo, I.; Searle, R. C.; Achenbach, K. L.; Le Bas, T. P.; Murton, B. J. (2012). "Eruptive hummocks: Building blocks of the upper ocean crust". Geology. 40 (1): 91–94. Bibcode:2012Geo....40...91Y. doi:10.1130/G31892.1.
- Searle, R. C.; Escartín, J. (2013). "The Rheology and Morphology of Oceanic Lithosphere and Mid-Ocean Ridges". Mid-Ocean Ridges (PDF). Geophysical Monograph Series. pp. 63–93. doi:10.1029/148GM03. ISBN 9781118665879. S2CID 128921767.
- Parnell-Turner, R.; Sohn, R.A.; Peirce, C.; Reston, T.J.; MacLeod, C.J.; Searle, R.C.; Simão, N.M. (2017). "Oceanic detachment faults generate compression in extension". Geology. 45 (10): 923–926. Bibcode:2017Geo....45..923P. doi:10.1130/G39232.1. hdl:1912/9231. S2CID 30990659.

=== Books ===
- Searle, R. C. (2013). Mid-Ocean Ridges. Cambridge University Press. ISBN 9781107434011. LCCN 2013017281.
