= Uristidae =

Scientific classification
- Domain: Eukaryota
- Kingdom: Animalia
- Phylum: Arthropoda
- Class: Malacostraca
- Order: Amphipoda
- Superfamily: Lysianassoidea
- Family: Uristidae

Family of crustaceans

Uristidae is a family of crustaceans belonging to the order Amphipoda.

== Genera ==
Genera:

- Abyssorchomene De Broyer, 1984
- Anonyx Krøyer, 1838
- Caeconyx Barnard & Karaman, 1991
