= Julian Pearce (geochemist) =

British geochemist

- Education: Selwyn College, Cambridge; University of East Anglia
- Awards: Bigsby Medal (1993); Murchison Medal (2014)
- Scientific career
- Fields: Geochemistry
- Workplaces: Cardiff University; Open University; Newcastle University; Durham University
- Thesis: Some relationships between the geochemistry and tectonic setting of basic volcanic rocks (1973)
- Doctoral advisor: Johnson Cann

Julian Anthony Pearce is a geochemist who is currently professor emeritus at Cardiff University.

He graduated with a first-class degree in natural sciences from Selwyn College, Cambridge, in 1970 and completed his PhD at the University of East Anglia in 1973. He best known for his work on ophiolites, island arcs and the geochemical fingerprinting of rocks and minerals.

He was awarded the Bigsby Medal of the Geological Society of London in 1993 and the Murchison Medal in 2014. He has an h-index of 79 according to Google Scholar.
