= Helen McGaffey Searles =

American professor and suffragist (1856–1936)

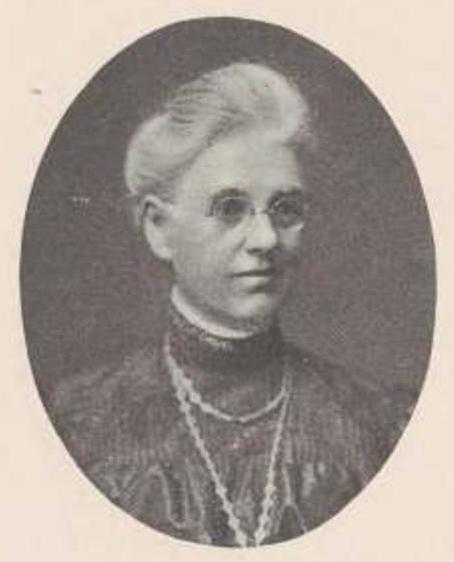
- Searles in 1910
- Born: Helen McGaffey; February 10, 1856; Barre, Canada
- Died: April 15, 1936 (aged 80); South Hadley, Massachusetts
- Education: Lake Forest College; University of Chicago
- Occupations: Classicist and suffragette
- Employer: Mount Holyoke College

Helen McGaffey Searles (1856 – 1936) was a Canadian-born, American professor, classicist, and women's suffragist. She received her doctorate from the University of Chicago in 1898, and taught Latin at Mount Holyoke College from 1899 until her retirement in 1922.

== Life and education ==
Helen McGaffey Searles was born on February 10, 1856, to Henry Rogers and Delia A. McGaffey in Barre, Canada. She received a Master of Arts from Lake Forest College in Illinois in 1894, then received a doctorate in comparative philology from the University of Chicago in 1898.

== Career ==
After graduating in 1898, Searles taught for less than one year at the Pennsylvania College for Women (now Chatham University) in Pittsburgh before she accepted a position teaching Latin at Mount Holyoke College in Massachusetts in 1899. She also taught at the Ferry Hall School in Lake Forest, Illinois between 1899 and 1904.

During her career as a professor, Searles was active in the women's suffrage movement. She represented Mount Holyoke College at the March 23, 1907 meeting of the Boston Equal Suffrage Association, which focused on women's secondary education and featured female representatives from other Boston-area colleges and universities, including other Seven Sisters colleges.

Searles retired from Mount Holyoke College in 1922. She remained associated with the college and held the title of Professor Emeritus until her death.

== Death and legacy ==
Helen McGaffey Searles died on April 15, 1936, at the age of 80, in South Hadley, Massachusetts.

The Helen Searles Mount Holyoke College Personnel File is held in the Archives and Special Collections at Mt. Holyoke College, South Hadley, Massachusetts.

== Selected works ==
- Searles, Helen M (1898) A lexicographical study of the Greek inscriptions. Studies on Classical Philology: University of Chicago Press
