= Catherine Searle =

American mathematician

Catherine Searle is an American mathematician specializing in differential geometry and in particular on the curvature and symmetry of manifolds and Alexandrov spaces. She is a professor of mathematics at Wichita State University.

== Education and career ==
Searle majored in mathematics and physics at Bryn Mawr College, graduating in 1984. She went to the University of Maryland, College Park for graduate study in mathematics, completing her Ph.D. in 1992. Her dissertation, Manifolds of Positive Curvature with Large Symmetry Groups, was supervised by Karsten Grove.

For approximately the next 20 years she worked as a researcher in Mexico, initially at CINVESTAV from 1992 to 1998, and then at the Cuernavaca unit of the Institute of Mathematics of the National Autonomous University of Mexico from 1996 to 2011. She was also affiliated with the National System of Researchers beginning in 1993.

In 2012 she returned to the US as a visiting professor at Oregon State University. She became an assistant professor at Wichita State University in 2014, earned tenure there as an associate professor in 2017, and was promoted to full professor in 2019.

== Recognition ==
Searle was elected to the Mexican Academy of Sciences in 2010.
