= Justice Searle =

Justice Searle may refer to:

- Elhanan J. Searle (1835–1906), associate justice of the Arkansas Supreme Court
- Nathaniel Searle (1703–1781), associate justice of the Rhode Island Supreme Court
