= InterRidge =

Non-profit organisation that promotes ocean research

InterRidge is a non-profit organisation that promotes interdisciplinary, international studies in the research of oceanic spreading centres, including mid-ocean ridge and back-arc basin systems. It does so by creating a global research community, planning and coordinating new science programs that no single nation can achieve alone, exchanging scientific information, and sharing new technologies and facilities. InterRidge is dedicated to reaching out to the public, scientists and governments, and to providing a unified voice for ocean ridge researchers worldwide.

It was launched in 1992, and in 2011 InterRidge has 6 principal, 3 associate, and 21 corresponding member nations and regions. InterRidge has more than 2500 individual member scientists in disciplines ranging from marine geology to chemistry, biology, and ocean engineering.

The InterRidge Office rotates every 3 years. During 2013-2015, InterRidge is being hosted by the Institute of Theoretical and Applied Geophysics, Peking University, Beijing, China. InterRidge is governed by a steering committee consisting of delegates from the principal and associate member nations and regions.

== Main functions ==
InterRidge has four main functions, which may be summarised as:

1. Building a community of ridge scientists
2. Identifying important scientific questions through working groups and workshops
3. Acting as a voice for ridge scientists
4. Education and outreach.

InterRidge serves as a "clearinghouse" for information on mid-ocean ridge research across the globe. InterRidge publishes an annual newsletter with preliminary results from field work, national and regional reports, and working group updates. InterRidge maintains 3 databases:

- member database
- research cruise database (past and upcoming cruises to the ridge crest)
- database of active hydrothermal vent fields, established in 2000 (InterRidge Japan office)

== Development ==
=== First decade (1992 - 2003) ===
InterRidge began at a meeting in France in 1990 that gathered ridge scientists from 10 nations and regions with reports submitted by Canada, France, Iceland, Japan, Portugal, USSR, UK, and USA. The rationale for this meeting developed from a recommendation at a previous U.S. RIDGE initiative workshop that an international initiative be pursued. Following the first InterRidge meeting, an "Interim Steering Group" was formed and the first programme plan was produced in 1992.

As stated on the InterRidge website, the first decade (1992-2003) of the organisation "produced a coordinated, international ridge community of member countries that had previously been working alone, and left a string of success stories in its wake. Two examples are the first-ever mapping and sampling of one of the slowest spreading and remote centres known to date, the Gakkel Ridge in the Arctic Ocean, and the exploration and study of the Southwest Indian Ridge."

The InterRidge Vents Database version 1.0 was brought online in 2000 by InterRidge Japan. It was modelled off of a compilation of massive sulfide deposits produced by Mark Hannington for the Geological Survey of Canada.

=== Second decade (2004 - 2013) ===
Two functions of InterRidge were developed more fully in the second decade (2004-2013) of the organisation:

1. The scientific working groups
2. Education and outreach

Scientific working groups are a key metric for success as to how InterRidge is delivering on its mission. These working groups are proposed by an international group of scientists, usually following a call for proposals issued by the InterRidge Office. Working groups in 2011 are Hydrothermal Energy and Ocean Carbon Cycles, Long-Range Exploration, Mantle Imaging, Seafloor Mineralisation, and Vent Ecology.

In 2008, InterRidge began offering fellowships for student research projects, and in 2009 InterRidge began a partnership with the International Seabed Authority Endowment Fund to expand the programme into the InterRidge Student and Postdoctoral Fellowship Programme.

In 2010, v2.0 of the InterRidge Vents Database was released, intended to be "comprehensive for active and inferred active (unconfirmed) submarine hydrothermal vent fields discovered through the end of 2009". Version 3.0 was released in December 2012, hosted on servers of the Woods Hole Oceanographic Institution prior to transfer to InterRidge China.

In 2011, InterRidge began a "Cruise Travel Bursary" scheme to enable early-career scientists to participate in research cruises.

=== Third decade (2014 - 2023) ===
The InterRidge Third Decadal Plan was released in Volume 21 of InterRidge news in 2012. Therein are defined 6 report sections intended to guide research questions and development between 2014 and 2023:

1. Mid-Ocean Ridge Tectonic and Magmatic Processes
2. Seafloor and Sub-Seafloor Resources
3. Mantle Control
4. Ridge-Ocean Interactions and Fluxes
5. Off-Axis Processes and Consequences of Ridge Processes for the Evolution of the Lithosphere
6. Past, Present, and Future of Vent Ecosystems

== Associated research ==
In 2009, scientists from USA, Japan and the UK laid the foundations for finding the deepest-ever hydrothermal vents, in a research cruise to the Mid-Cayman Rise, in April 2010. Ridge-crest scientists are also exploring the East Scotia Ridge in the Southern Ocean, part of a 3-year programme, as well as the Russian branch of InterRidge which has studied hydrothermal clusters along part of the Mid-Atlantic Ridge. As economic growth puts pressure on resources, new sources of minerals and materials are needed, and licences are being sought for the exploration of seafloor massive sulphides. InterRidge coordinates neutral scientific input to these discussions.

== Interactions with international organisations ==
InterRidge is an affiliated program to SCOR (Scientific Committee on Oceanic Research), has a liaison to IODP (Integrated Ocean Drilling Program), and is in close communication with other organizations such as ChEss (Chemosynthetic Ecosystem science), a field project of the Census of Marine Life programme (CoML).

== Code of conduct ==
Starting in 2000 with a workshop on "Management and Conservation of Hydrothermal Vent Ecosystems," the InterRidge Biology Working Group developed a set of six guidelines which was published in 2006 as "Responsible Science at Hydrothermal Vents". By 2011, 180 people had signed to support this statement.
