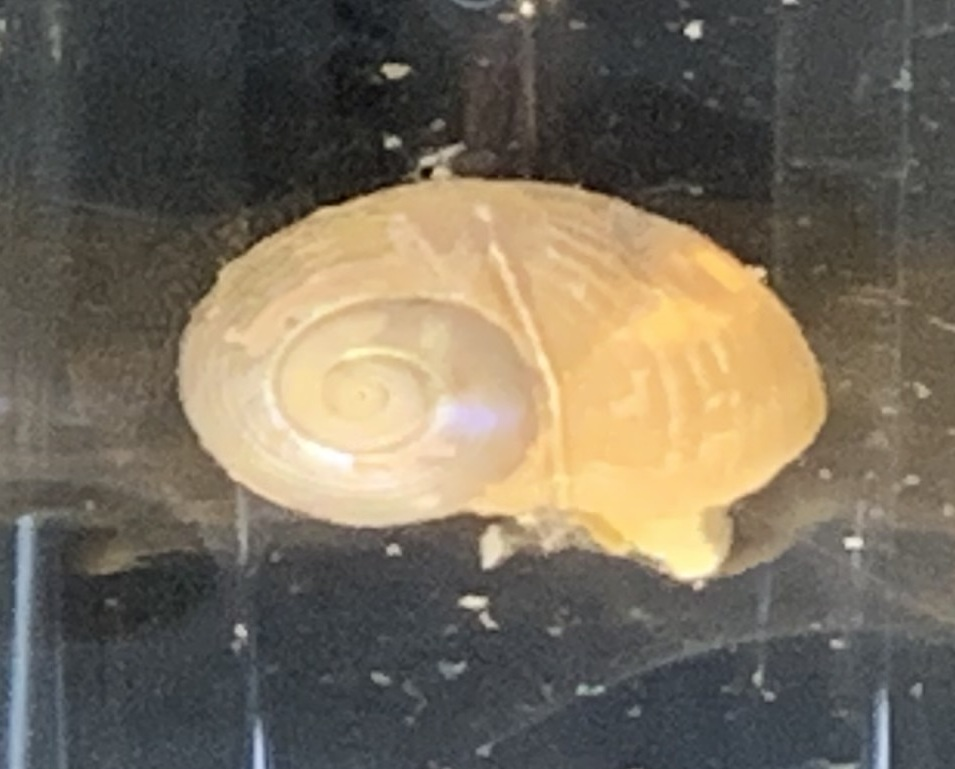

Scientific classification
- Kingdom: Animalia
- Phylum: Mollusca
- Class: Gastropoda
- Subclass: Vetigastropoda
- Order: Trochida
- Family: Margaritidae
- Genus: Margarites
- Species: M. shinkai

Binomial name
- Margarites shinkai Okutani, Tsuchida & Fujikura, 1992

= Margarites shinkai =

Species of gastropod

Margarites shinkai is a species of sea snail, a marine gastropod mollusk in the family Margaritidae. The species is named after the deep diving submersible DSV Shinkai 2000.

== Distribution ==
This marine species occurs near cold seeps off the Sagami Bay, Japan.
