= DSV Shinkai 2000 =

Japanese crewed research submersible

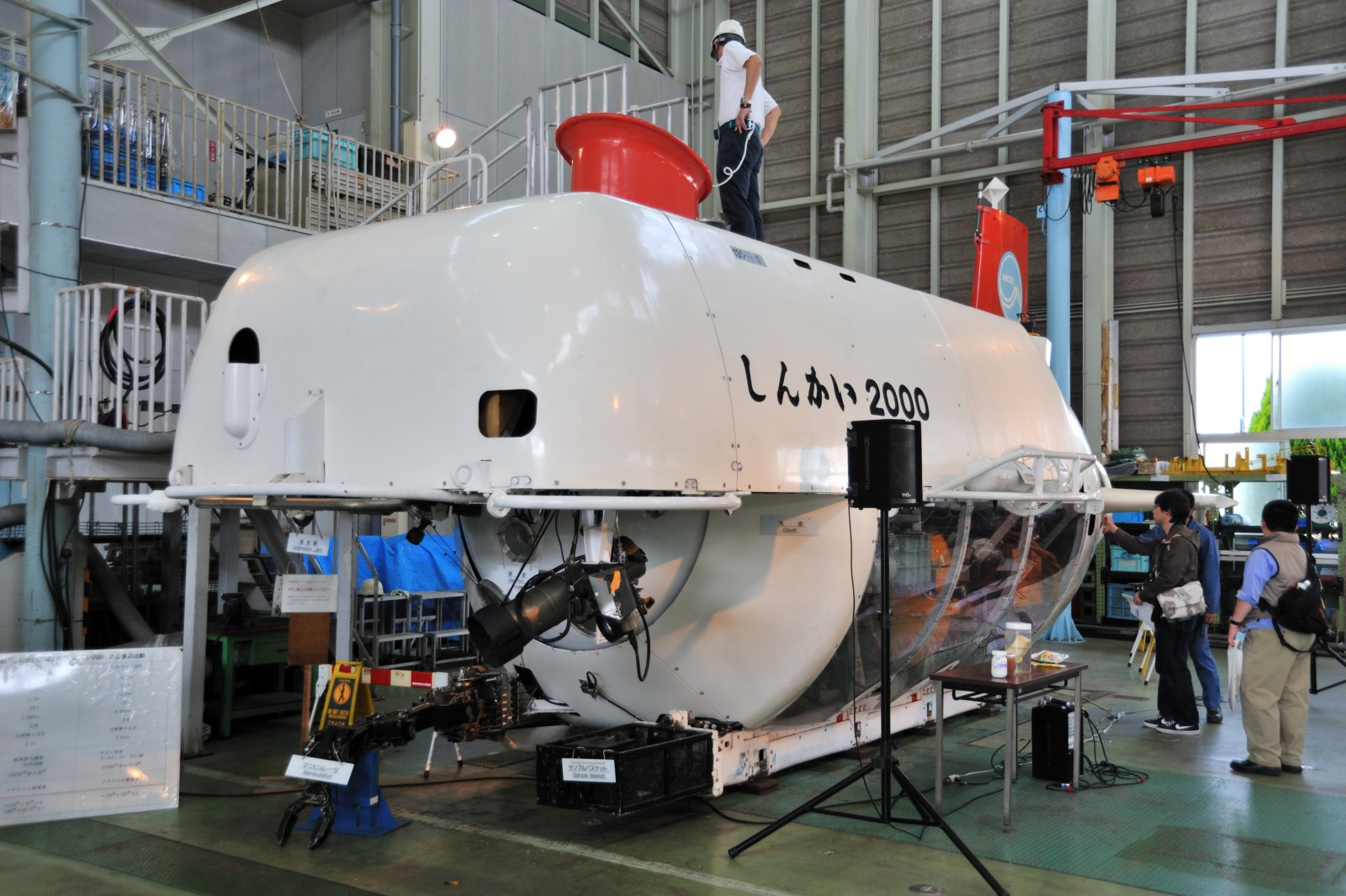
- Shinnkai 2000

History

JapanJapan
- Name: Shinkai 2000
- Builder: Mitsubishi Heavy Industries Kobe Shipyard
- Cost: 3.7billion (Japanese yen)
- Laid down: 1978
- Launched: 1981
- Sponsored by: JAMSTEC
- Completed: 1981
- Acquired: 1981
- Commissioned: 1981
- Decommissioned: 2004
- Maiden voyage: 1983
- In service: 1983
- Out of service: 2002
- Homeport: Yokosuka
- Status: Preserved at Shin Enoshima aquarium

General characteristics
- Type: Deep-submergence vehicle
- Length: 9.3 m (31 ft)
- Beam: 2.9 m (9.5 ft)
- Draft: 3.0 m (9.8 ft)
- Installed power: electric motor
- Speed: 3.0 knots (5.6 km/h; 3.5 mph)
- Endurance: 80h
- Test depth: 2,000 m (6,600 ft)
- Complement: 3

The Shinkai 2000 (しんかい) was a crewed research submersible that could dive up to a depth of 2,000 meters. It was completed in 1981 and until 1991 it had the greatest depth range of any crewed research vehicle in Japan. The Shinkai 2000 was owned and run by the Japan Agency for Marine-Earth Science and Technology (JAMSTEC) and it was launched from the support vessel Natsushima.

Two pilots and one researcher operated within a 30 mm thick High-strength low-alloy steel pressure hull with an internal diameter of 2.2 meters. Buoyancy was provided by syntactic foam.

Three methacrylate resin view ports were arranged at the front and on each side of the vehicle. The deep diving submersible Shinkai 2000 is eponymous for the genus Shinkai- polychaete worms of the family Chrysopetalidae. Bivalves hosting those parasitic polychaetes were collected during Dives 315 and 381 in the Hatsushima cold-seep site in Sagami Bay. The submersible is also eponymous for the species Margarites shinkai.

Preserved at Enoshima Aquarium, Enoshima Island, Fujisawa, Kanagawa

== See also ==
- DSV Shinkai 6500 – Japanese crewed research submersible
