= Enoshima Aquarium =

- 新江ノ島水族館

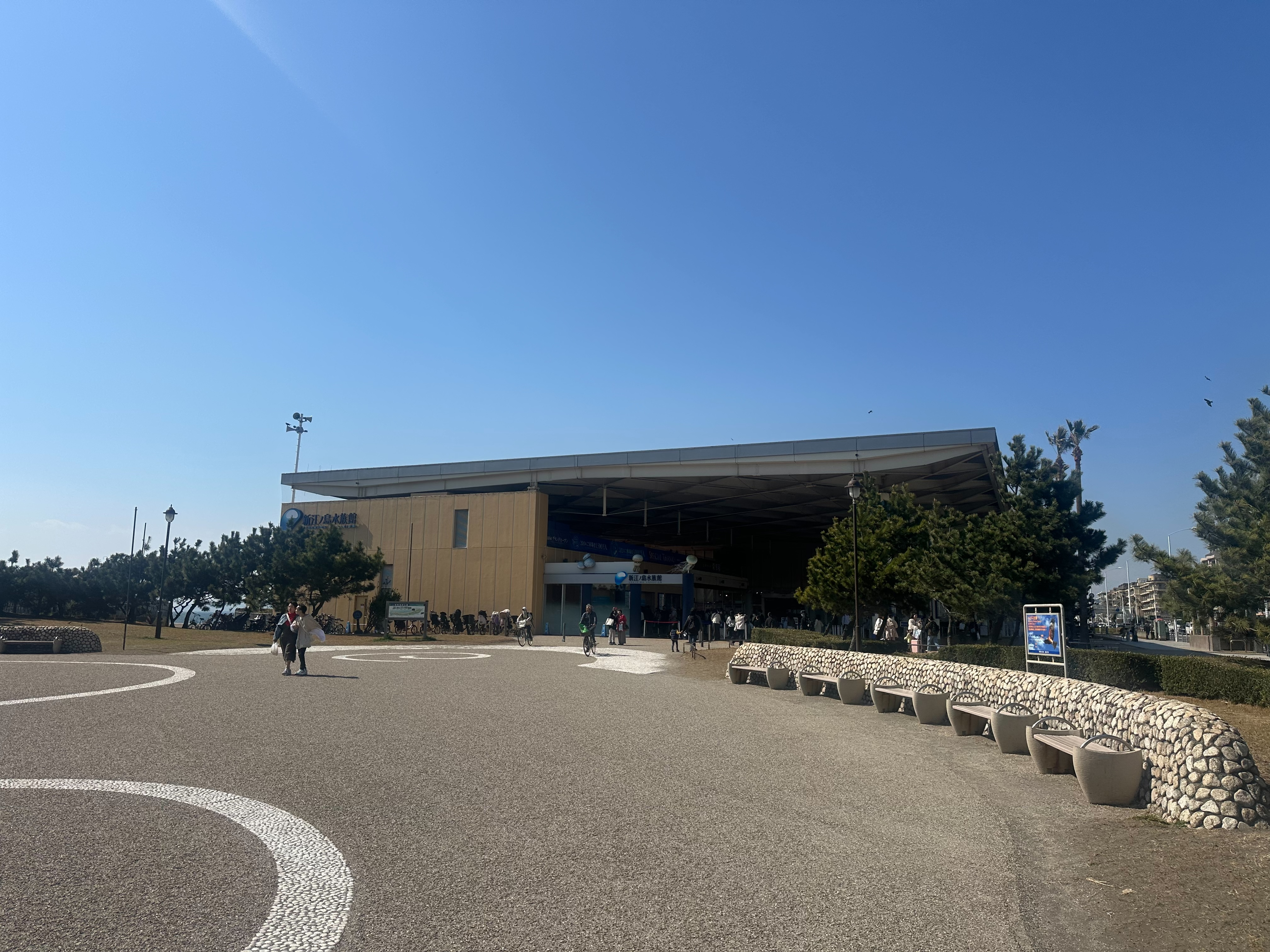
- Exterior of Enoshima Aquarium
- Interactive map of Enoshima Aquarium
- 36.7985°N 137.3881°E
- Date opened: 2004
- Location: Fujisawa, Kanagawa, Japan
- Land area: 14,000 m^{2} (150,000 sq ft)
- No. of animals: 26,000
- No. of species: 540
- Volume of largest tank: 1,000,000 litres (264,000 US gal)
- Total volume of tanks: 3,000,000 litres (793,000 US gal)
- Management: Enoshima Marine Corporation
- Website: https://www.enosui.com/

Enoshima Aquarium or New Enoshima Aquarium (新江ノ島水族館, Shin Enoshima Suizokukan) is a public aquarium located on Katase Beach in Fujisawa City, Kanagawa Prefecture, Japan. Its nickname is "Enosui," an abbreviation of the Japanese name. The aquarium is accredited as a Museum-equivalent facilities by the Museum Act from Ministry of Education, Culture, Sports, Science and Technology.

== History ==
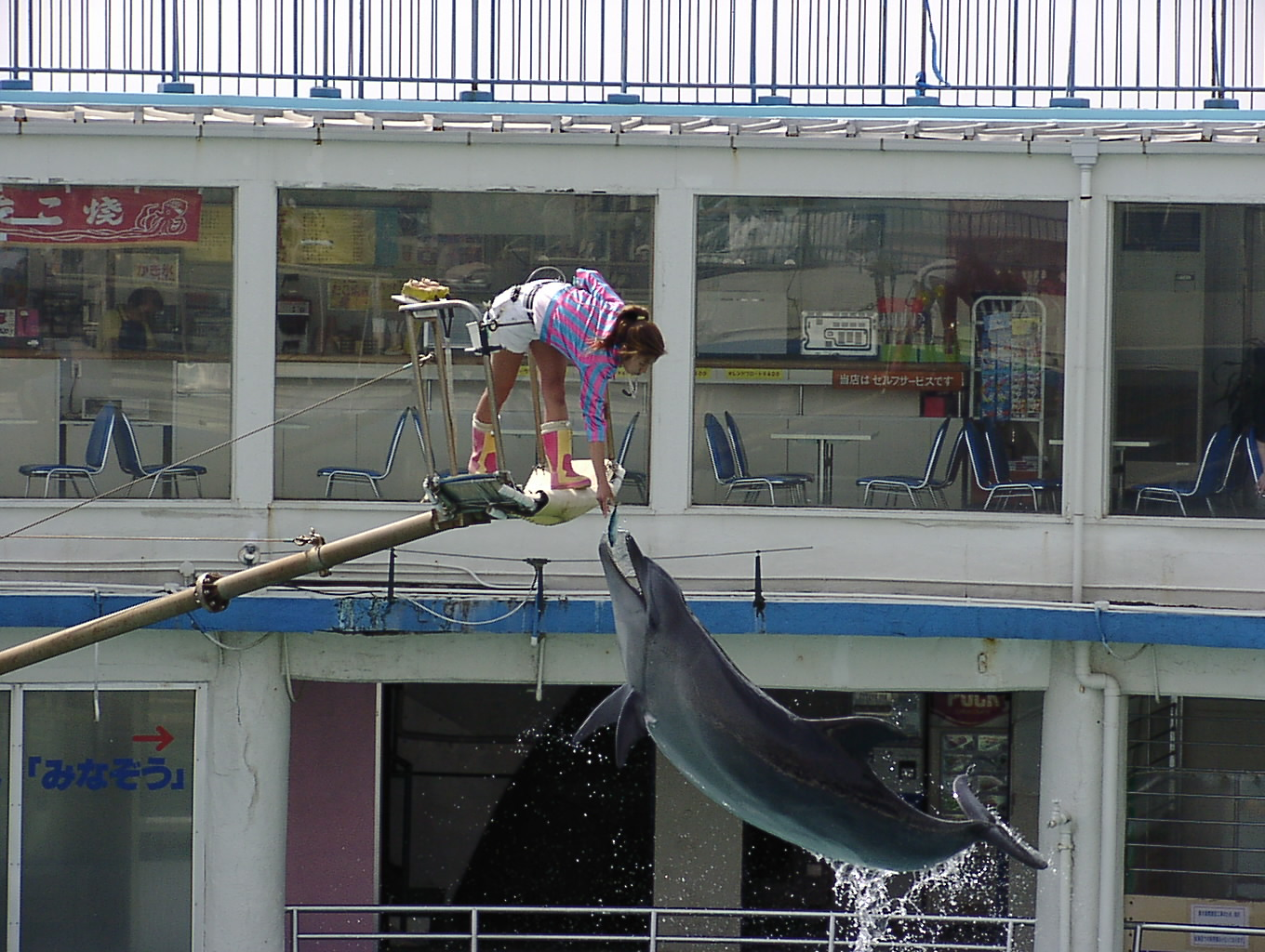
Marineland in former enoshima aquarium

Ltd. was established in 1952 by Hisasaku Hori, then president of Nikkatsu, and the former Enoshima Aquarium was opened on July 1, 1954.

In 1955, the aquarium was equipped with a circulatory filtration system and a water temperature controller, enabling it to exhibit a wide variety of tropical fish and other organisms year-round, and was designated as a Museum-equivalent facilities.

In 1956, Emperor Hirohito visited the aquarium. Hirohito has visited the aquarium 9 times since then.

Southern elephant seal, Daikichi, was kept for 13 years and 8 months from 1964, setting a record as the longest kept male Southern elephant seal. He also grew to 4.61 m in length, 5.41 m in total length, and 3 t in weight, making him the largest individual in captivity in the world.

Later in 1967, the former aquarium was expanded and "Enoshima Aquarium Marineland" opened.

It had the largest dolphin pool in Asia at the time, with a surface area of 1,000 square meters, a water volume of 5,000,000 litres (1,321,000 US gal), and a depth of 6 metres (20 ft). The dolphin pool at Marineland uses an open sand filtration system and raw water is seawater taken from the sea in front of the aquarium. It was originally built to house minke whales and was tentatively named the "Great Whale Release Pond" during construction, but it was not possible to secure minke whales by the time of its opening at the time, and it was decided to house Pacific white-sided dolphin, bottlenose dolphin and Risso's dolphin.

There used to be a show in which a Risso's dolphin would go through a fire ring and push a vinyl boat with a dog on board, but this ceased to take place in the 1980s.

In 1985, "Sea Otter's House," a breeding and exhibition room exclusively for sea otters, was built, and in 1987, "finless Porpoise Crystal Pool" was added to Marineland.

In 1988, a Japan-China joint research agreement on Baiji breeding (artificial breeding) was signed with the Institute of Aquatic Biology, Chinese Academy of Sciences.

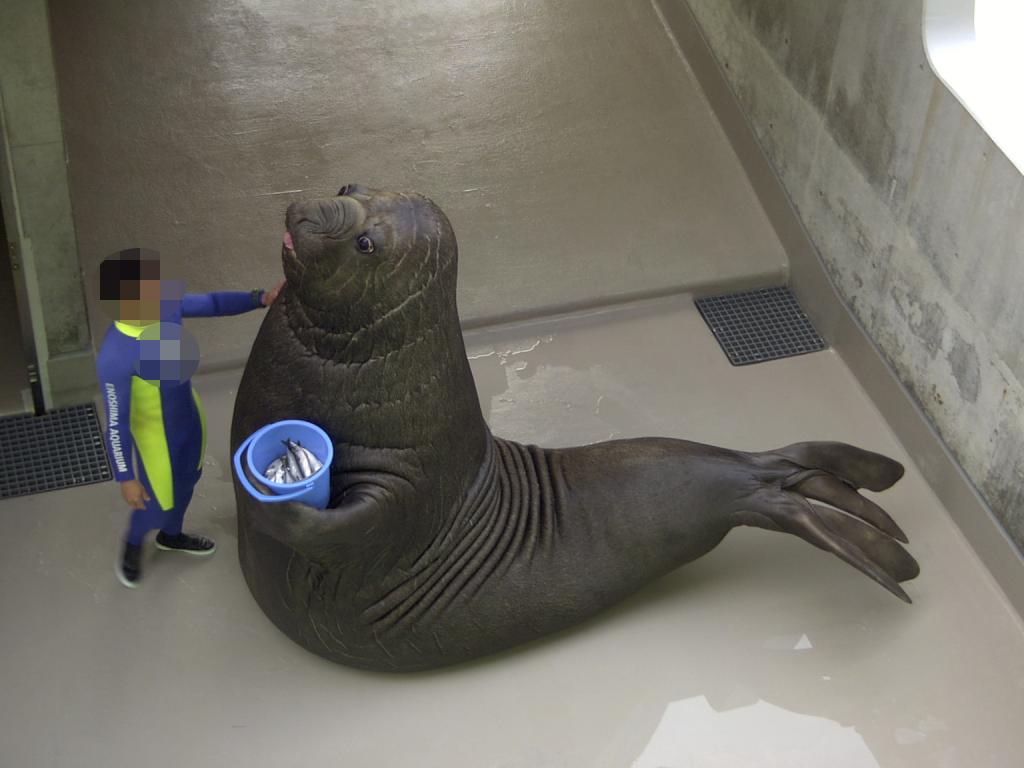
As of 1995, Minazo was 2 metres (6.6 ft) long and weighed approximately 176 kg (388 lb), but eventually grew to 4.5 metres (15 ft) in length and 2,000 kg (4,400 lb) in weight.

In 1995, a new Southern elephant seal was brought in from Uruguay and named Minazo by 1,500 public votes. Minazo was kept for 10 years and 6 months, but died of respiratory failure due to emphysema on October 4, 2005. Minazo's death was marked by a farewell party with flowers, paper cranes, and letters from local children.

For a long time, the aquarium was one of the tourist attractions in the Enoshima area. In 2001, plans were initiated to build a new Enoshima Aquarium, and on September 16, 2002, Marineland and Sea Zoo were closed and construction of the new Enoshima Aquarium began. The aquarium continued to operate, but the former Enoshima Aquarium was completely closed on December 31, 2003, and the New Enoshima Aquarium opened on April 16, 2004. In its first year of operation, 1.8 million people visited the aquarium.

Although the new Enoshima Aquarium does not have a large-capacity pool as it once did, the current dolphin pool has a sealed rapid sand filtration device that performs filtration 12 times a day. use permeated seawater taken from the ocean in front of the aquarium as raw water, and sodium hypochlorite is injected into the pool as a disinfectant for the breeding water. This is due to the outbreak of Erysipeloid infection at the former Enoshima Aquarium, in which many dolphins died. To prevent recurrence, the aquarium also conducts vaccinations, periodic antibody measurements, and uses neutral electrolyzed water.

On the site of the former Enoshima Aquarium, which operated until the end of the project, Enoshima Marine Corporation completed and operated a small shopping mall "Shonan Kazok" in 2005, but most of the stores closed in September 2009, and the building has already been demolished and is now used as an apartment building.

== Exhibits ==
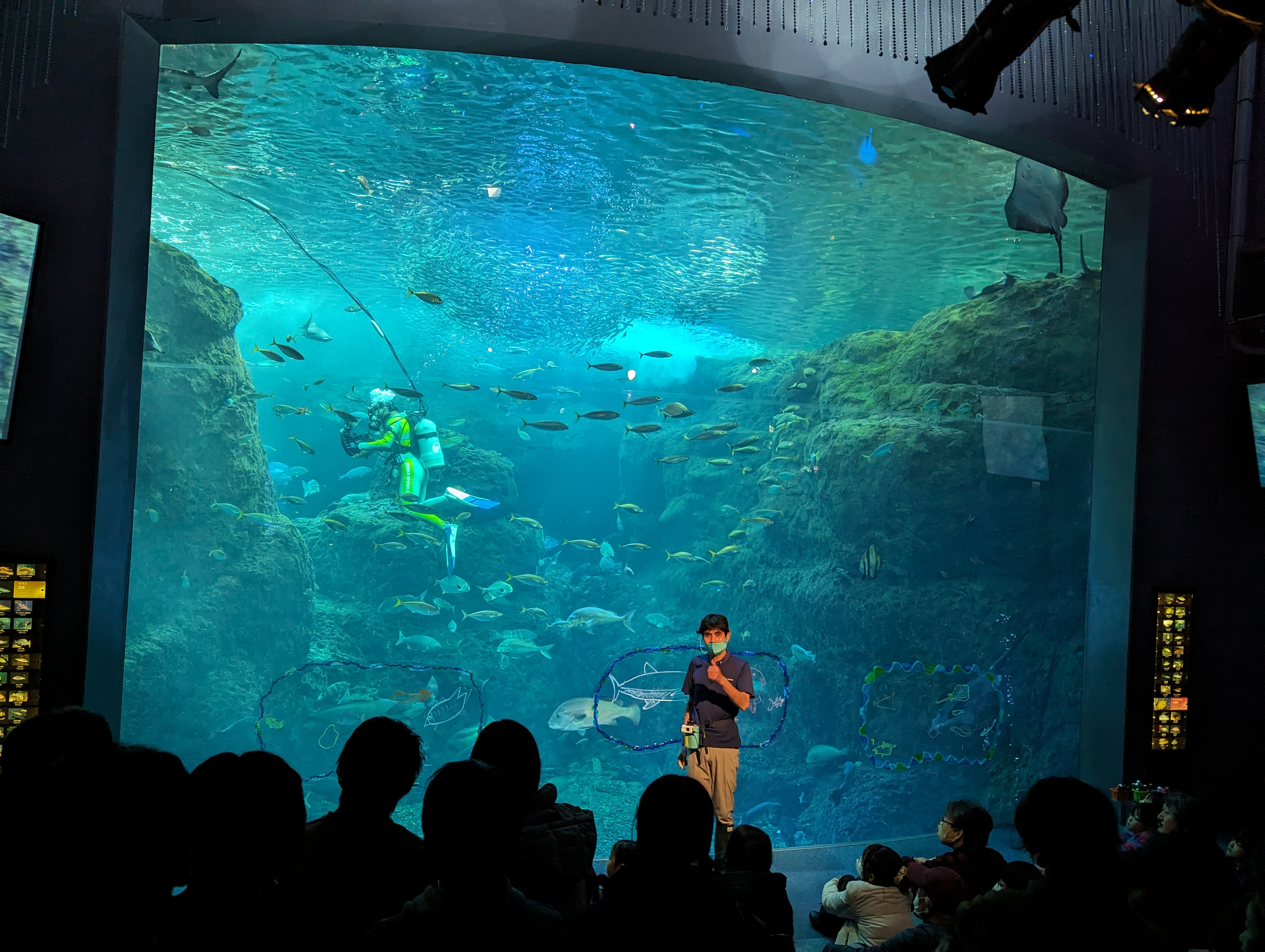
Sagami Bay Tank

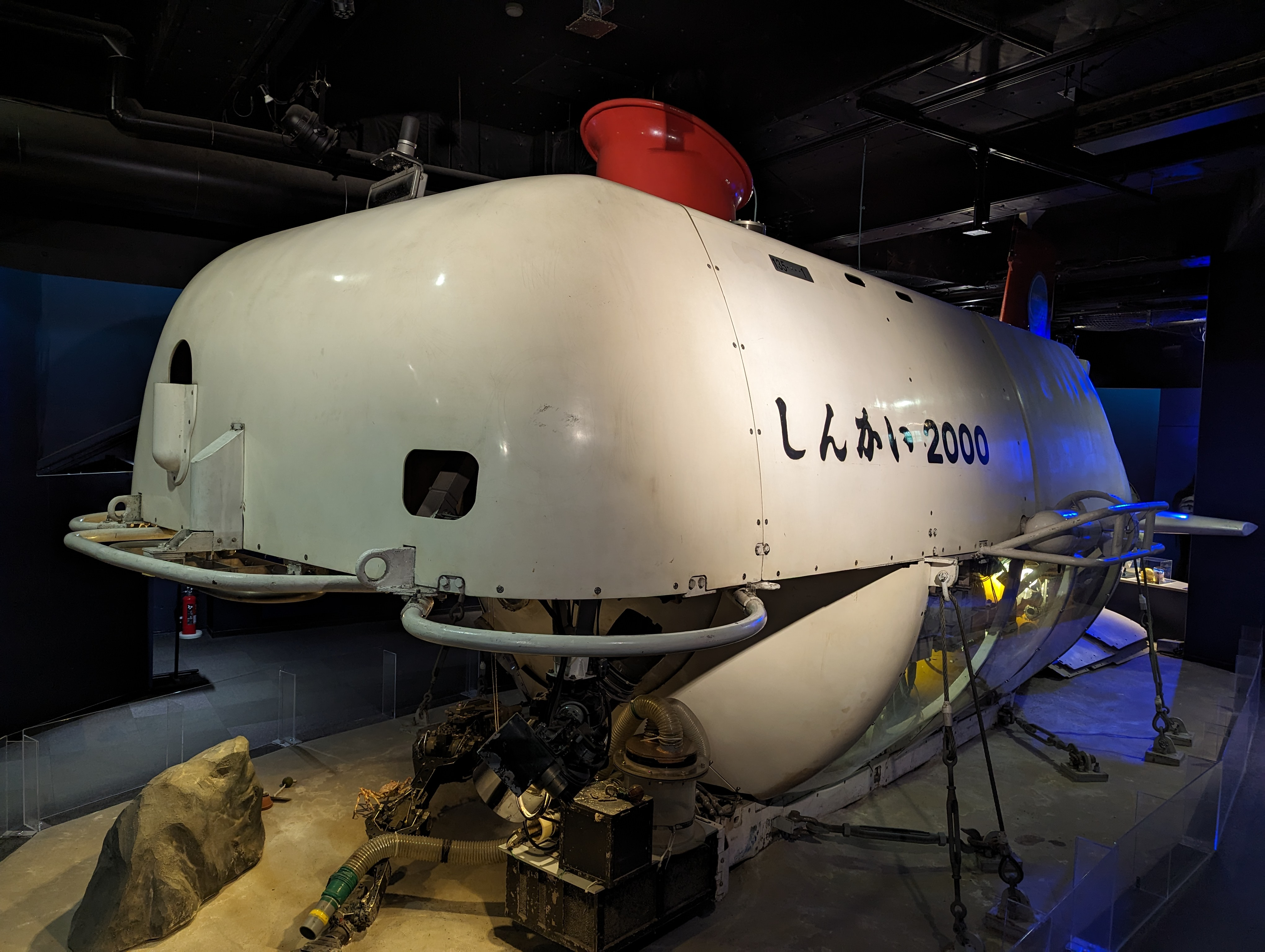
Shinkai 2000

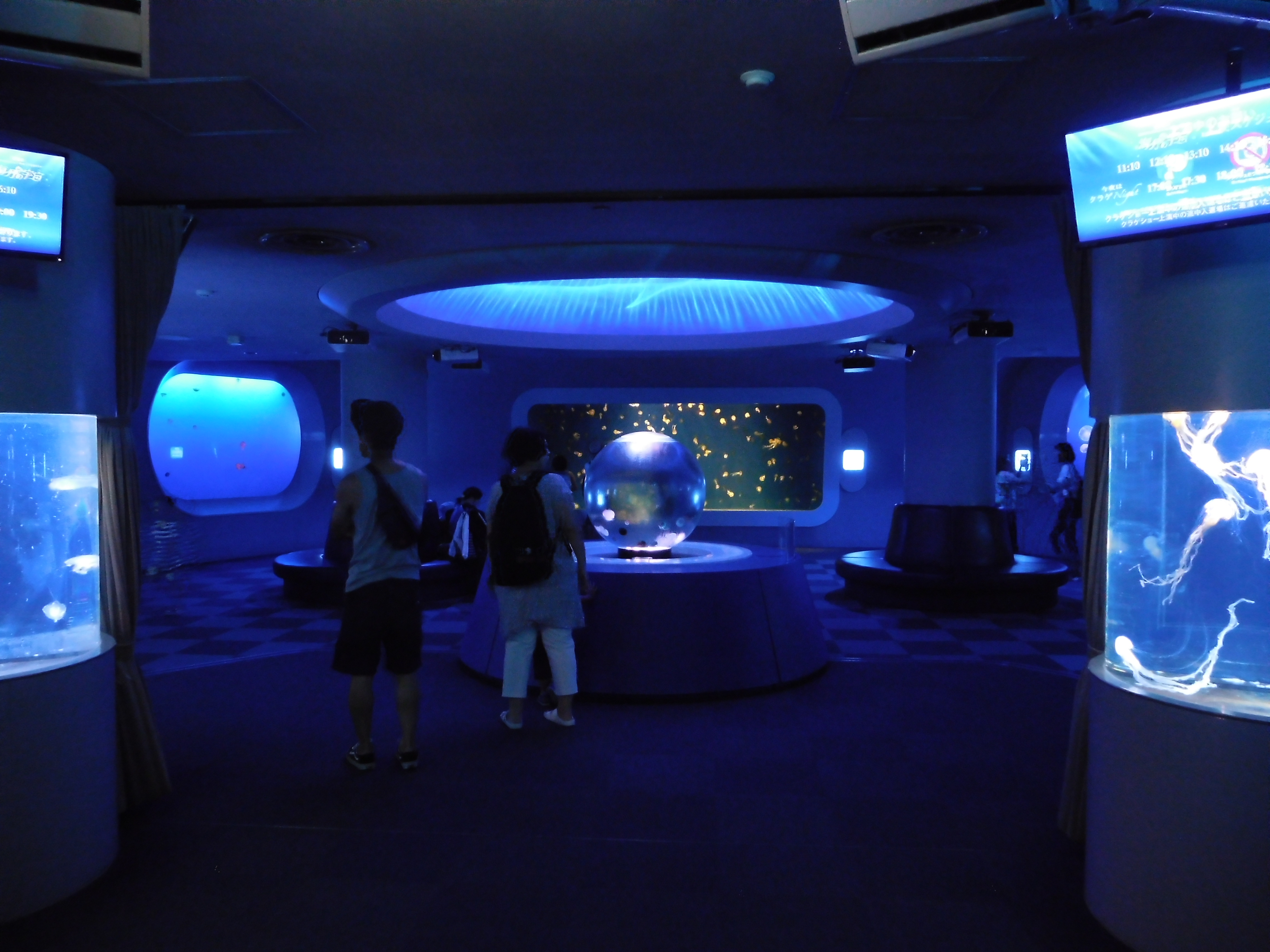
Jellyfish Fantasy Hall

The aquarium is centered around the Sagami Bay Tank, which reproduces the undersea environment of Sagami Bay, with tanks lined up for display at different depths, from shallow water to deep sea.

In the Shirasu Science section, the world's first permanent exhibit of Japanese anchovy fry is on display.

In the deep-sea corner, in addition to exhibits of deep-sea fish, there are exhibits of tubeworms that reproduce the chemosynthetic ecosystem of the deep-sea floor and an ecological exhibit of whalebone communities. In addition, due to joint research with the Japan Agency for Marine-Earth Science and Technology (JAMSTEC), there is a permanent display of the crewed deep-sea exploration vessel DSV Shinkai 2000 and other deep-sea exploration vessels from around the world.

Multiple jellyfish exhibit areas that took over from the former Enoshima Aquarium, which is a continuation of the former Enoshima Aquarium, as well as an exhibit section on the marine life research of Emperor Hirohito, Emperor Akihito, and Prince Fumihito, who were active as researchers.

=== Nagisa Learning Center ===
In the center of the long, east–west facility is a learning facility called the Nagisa Experience Learning Center, which was established by Kanagawa Prefecture.

Open to the public free of charge and operated by BTO, the first floor has a learning experiment classroom and an Internet-based learning corner, while the second floor has an aquarium where visitors can actually touch animals and other experimental facilities related to natural phenomena on the beach. On Saturdays and Sundays, learning programs are organized mainly for children, and the facilities are also available for rent.

== Research and conservation ==
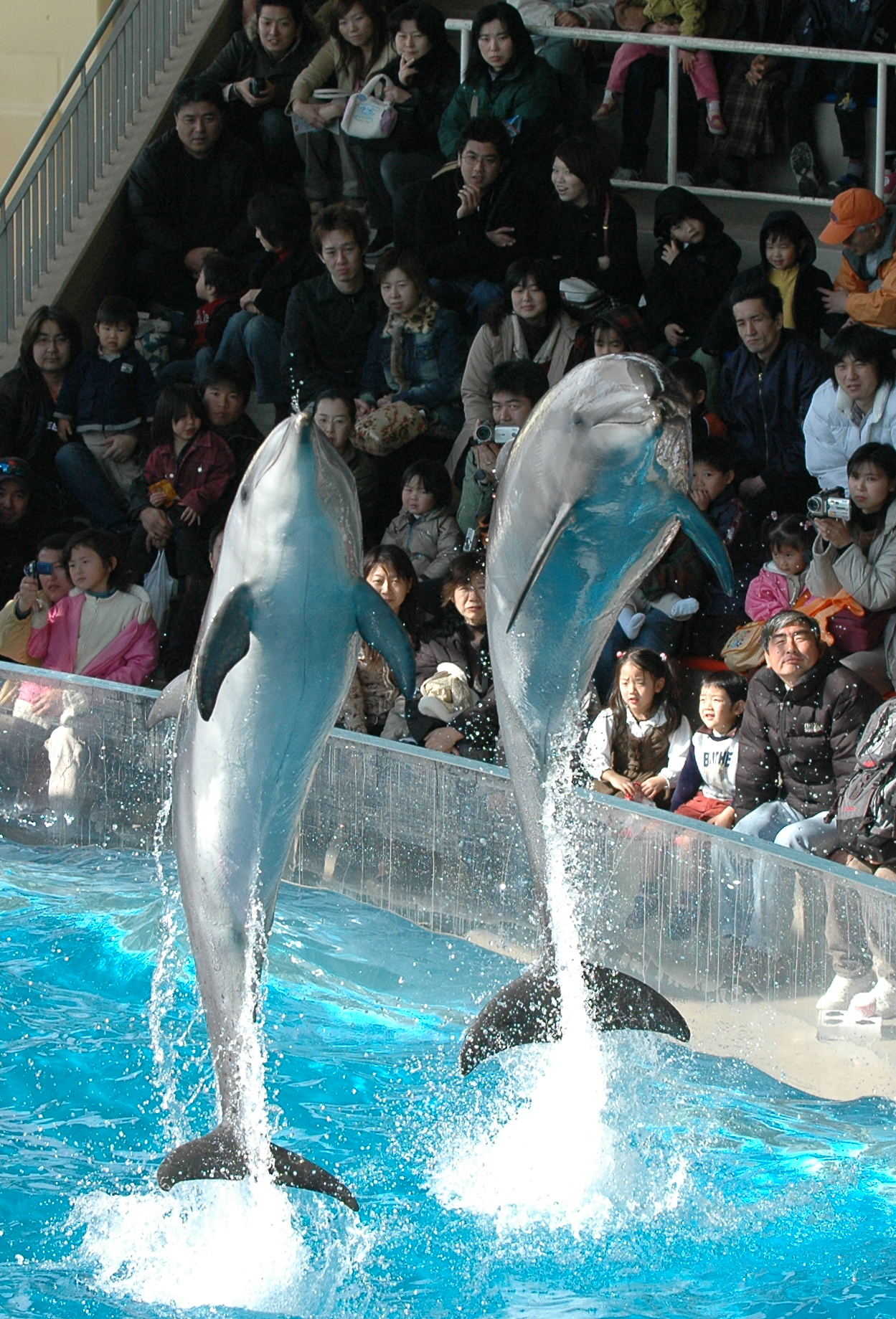
bottlenose dolphins

Since the time of its predecessor, the former Enoshima Aquarium, the aquarium had been actively engaged in the breeding of bottlenose dolphins, winning a breeding award in 1960, and Japan's first captive-bred third-generation "Palu" was born on August 3, 1988, followed by the world's first captive-bred fourth-generation "Millennie" on June 7, 2000.

On July 1, 2012, the world's first captive-bred 5th generation "Sawa" was born at the Enoshima Aquarium.

On April 21, 2020, the Enoshima Aquarium's first artificially inseminated breeding stock was born.

The aquarium places emphasis on the study of deep-sea organisms, and deep-sea organisms collected through research by JAMSTEC (Japan Agency for Marine-Earth Science and Technology) are described as new species and exhibited at the aquarium. In the past, Asymmetron inferum was described as a new species, and Shinkaia, Phronima sedentaria, and Bentheogennema borealis were exhibited for the first time in the world.

In 2005, the captive breeding of Nomura's jellyfish was successfully completed for the first time in the world.

Tima nigroannulata and Tiaricodon orientalis in 2021 and Octorhopalona saltatrix in 2022 are described as new species in collaboration with Kamo Aquarium, Aqua World and Kuroshio Biological Research Center.

== Gallery ==
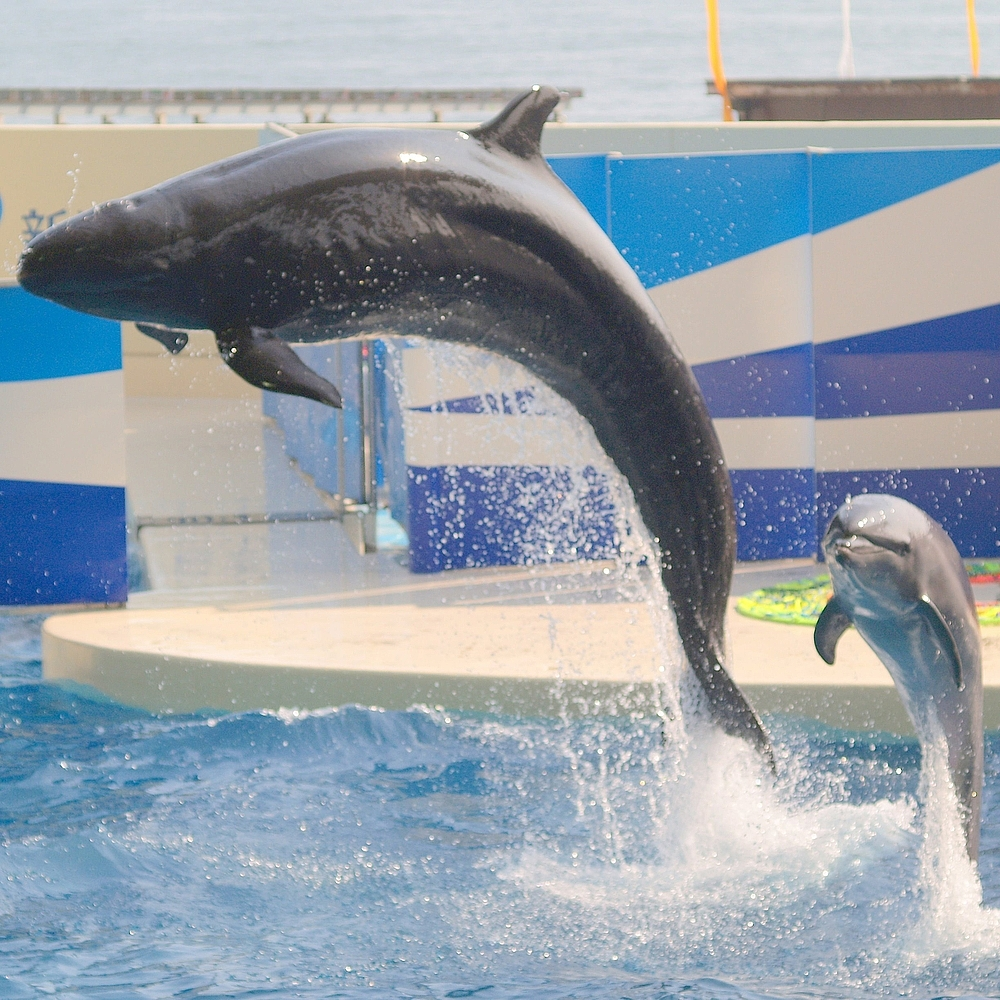

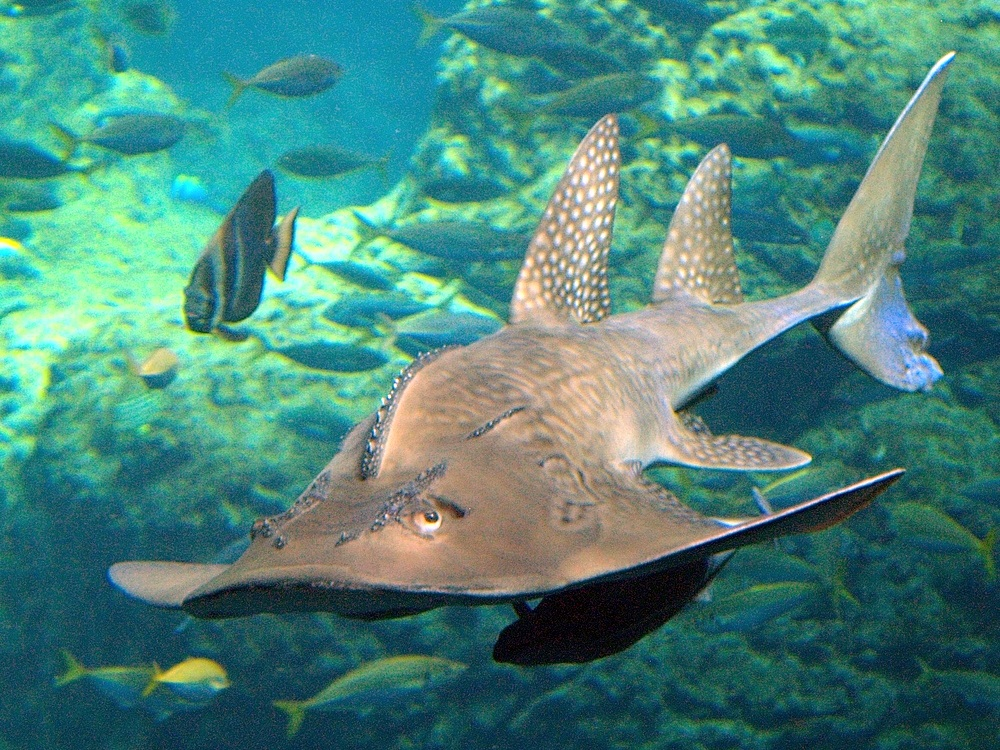

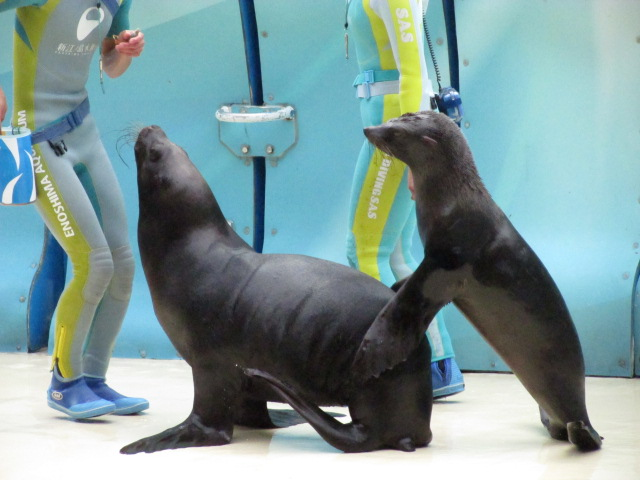

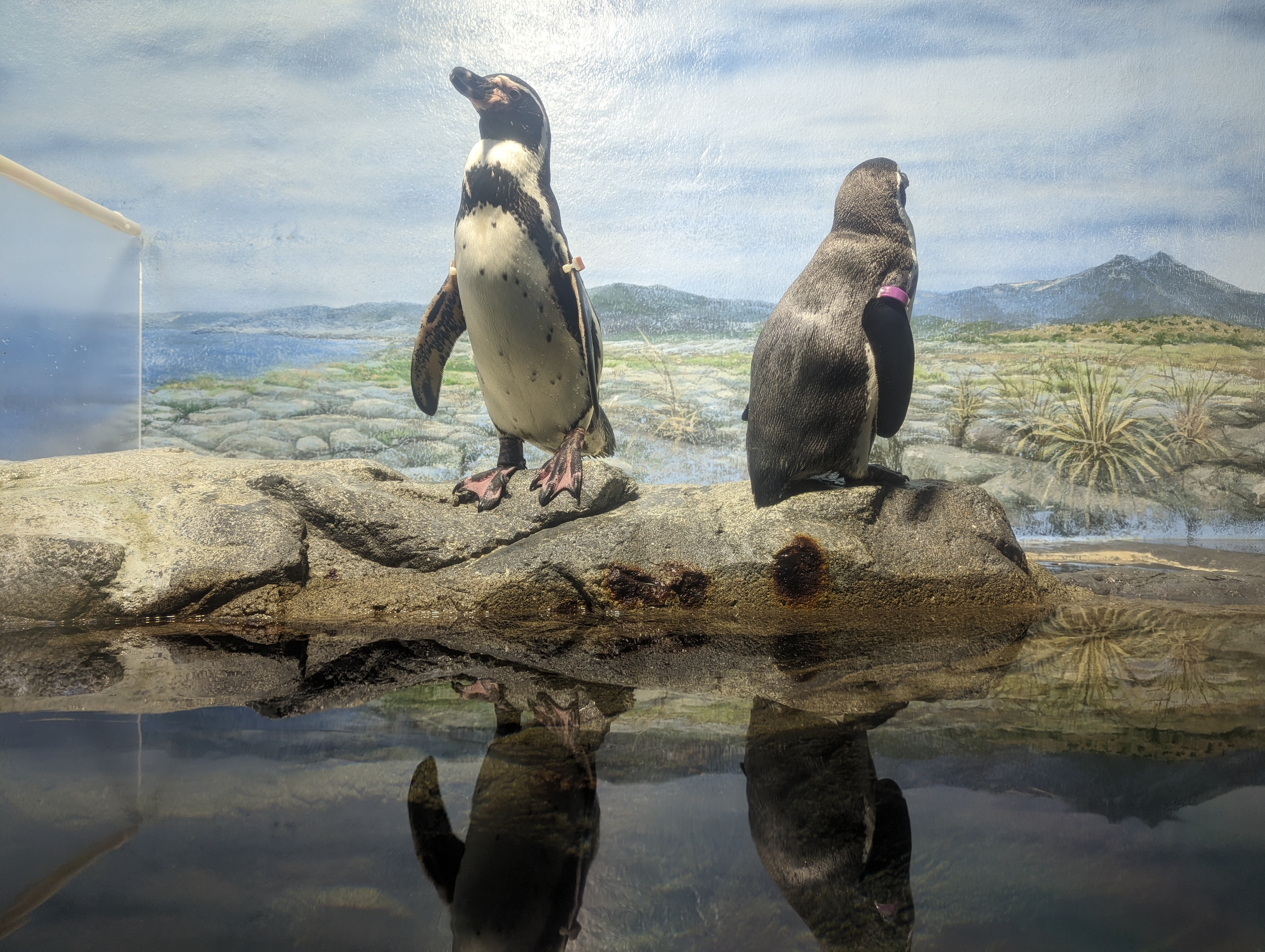

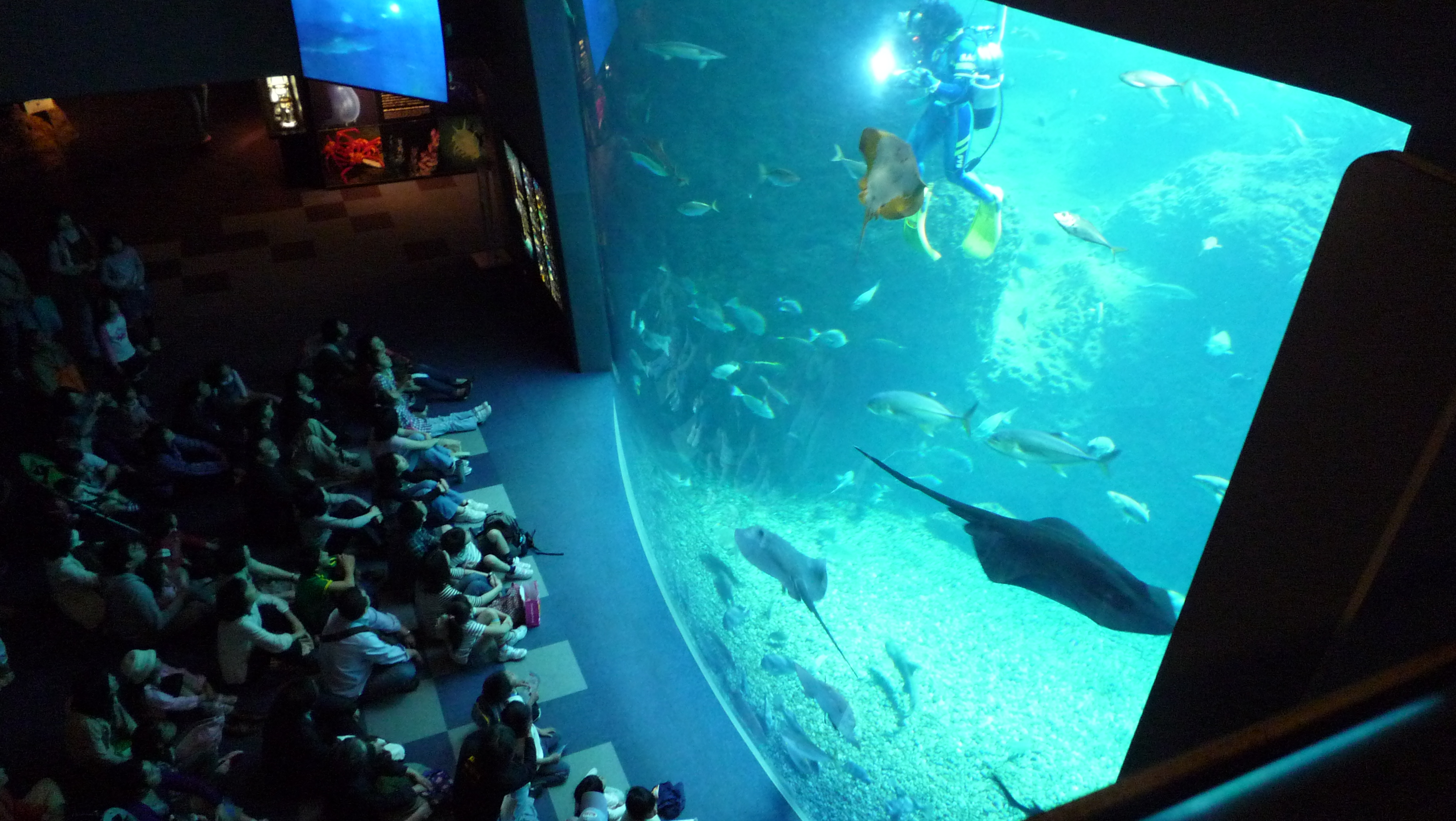

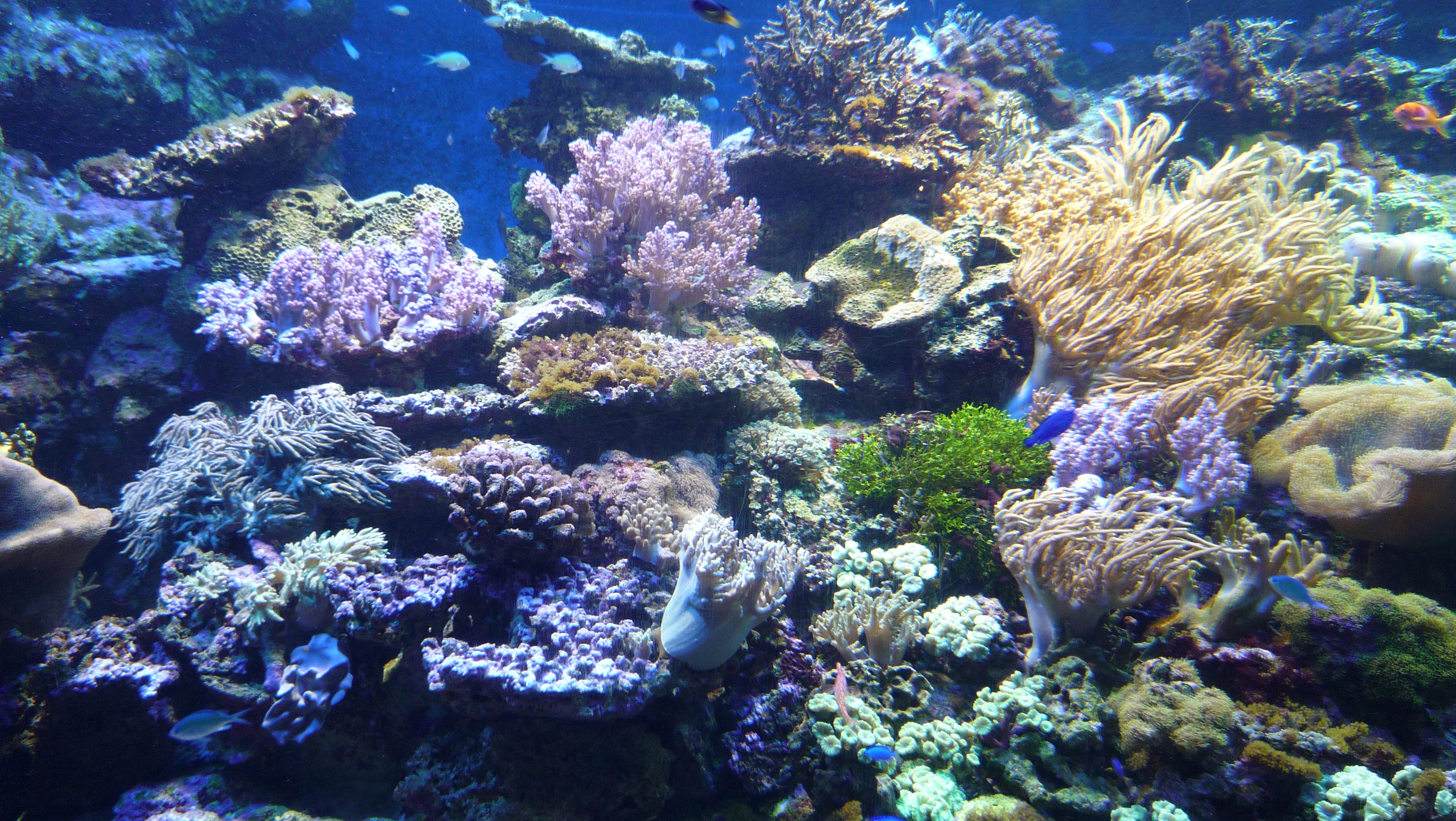

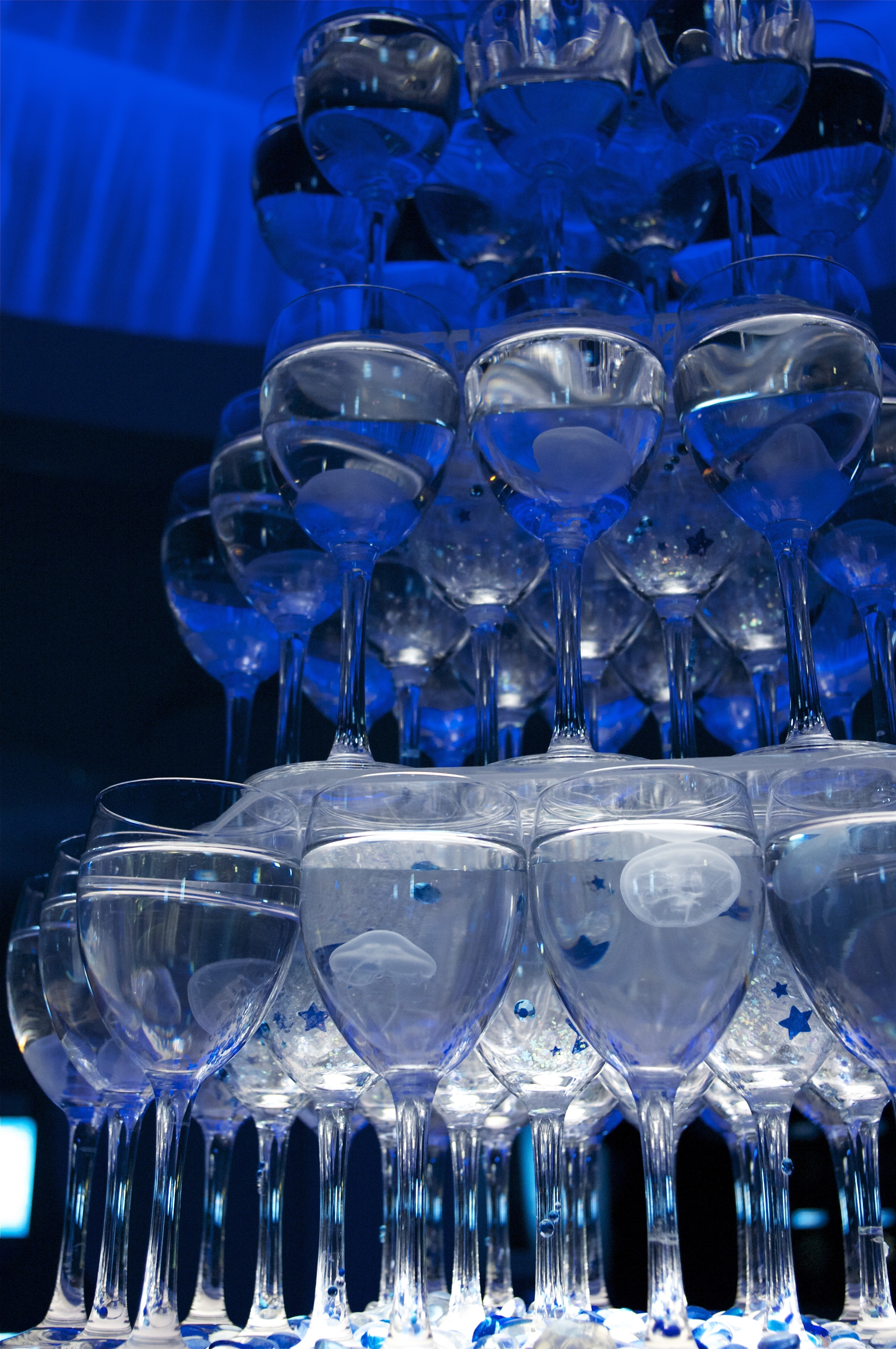

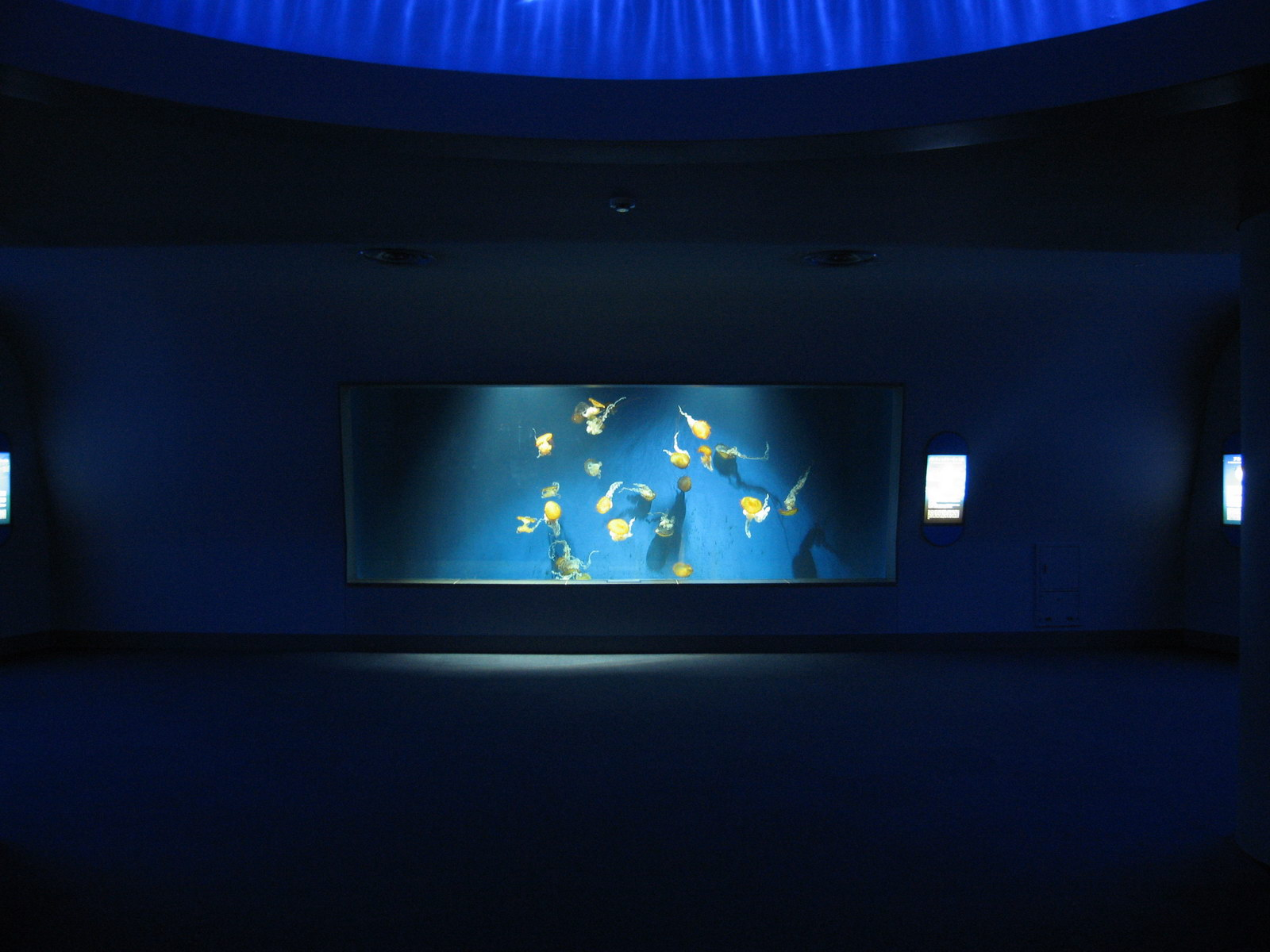

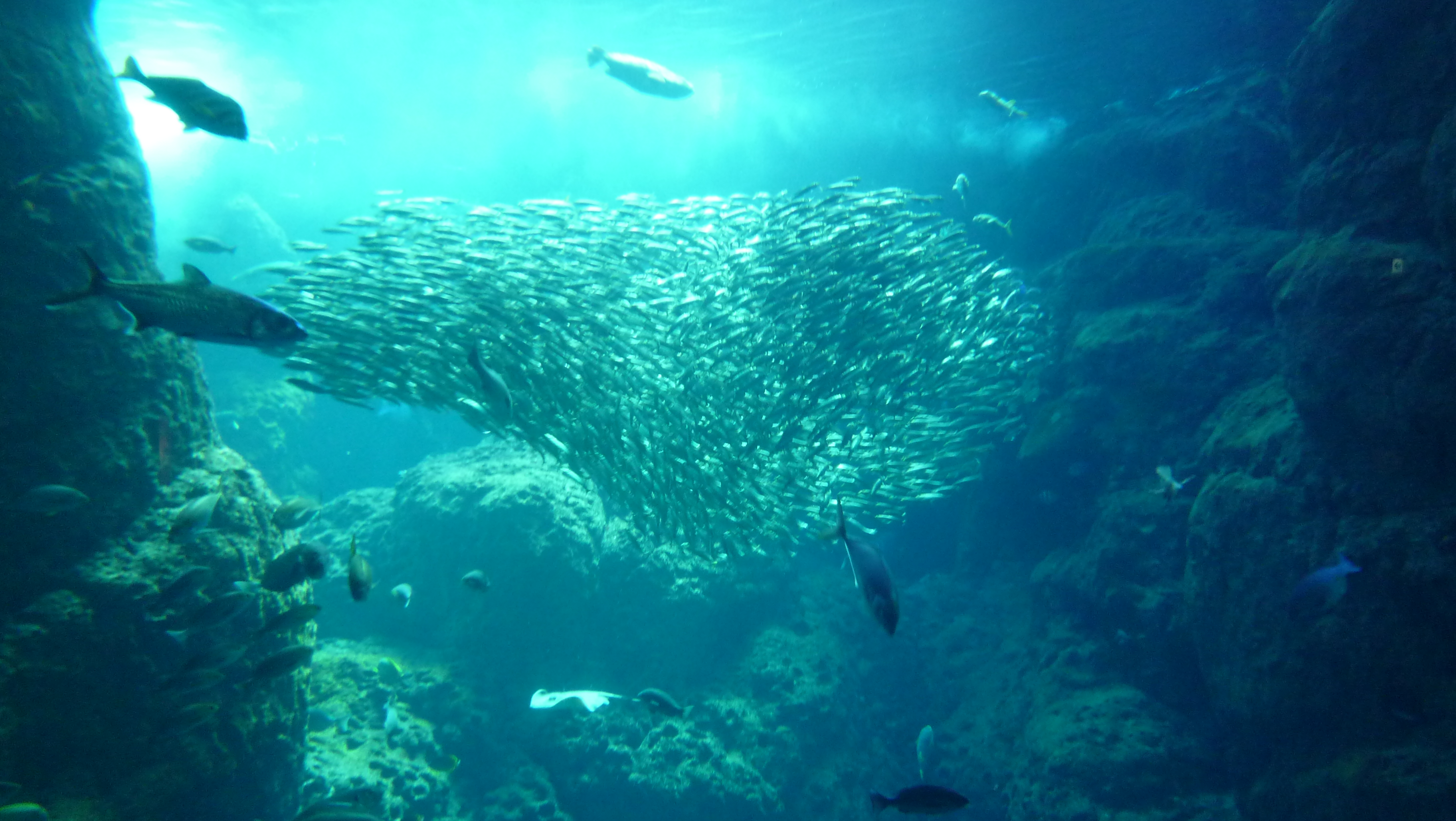

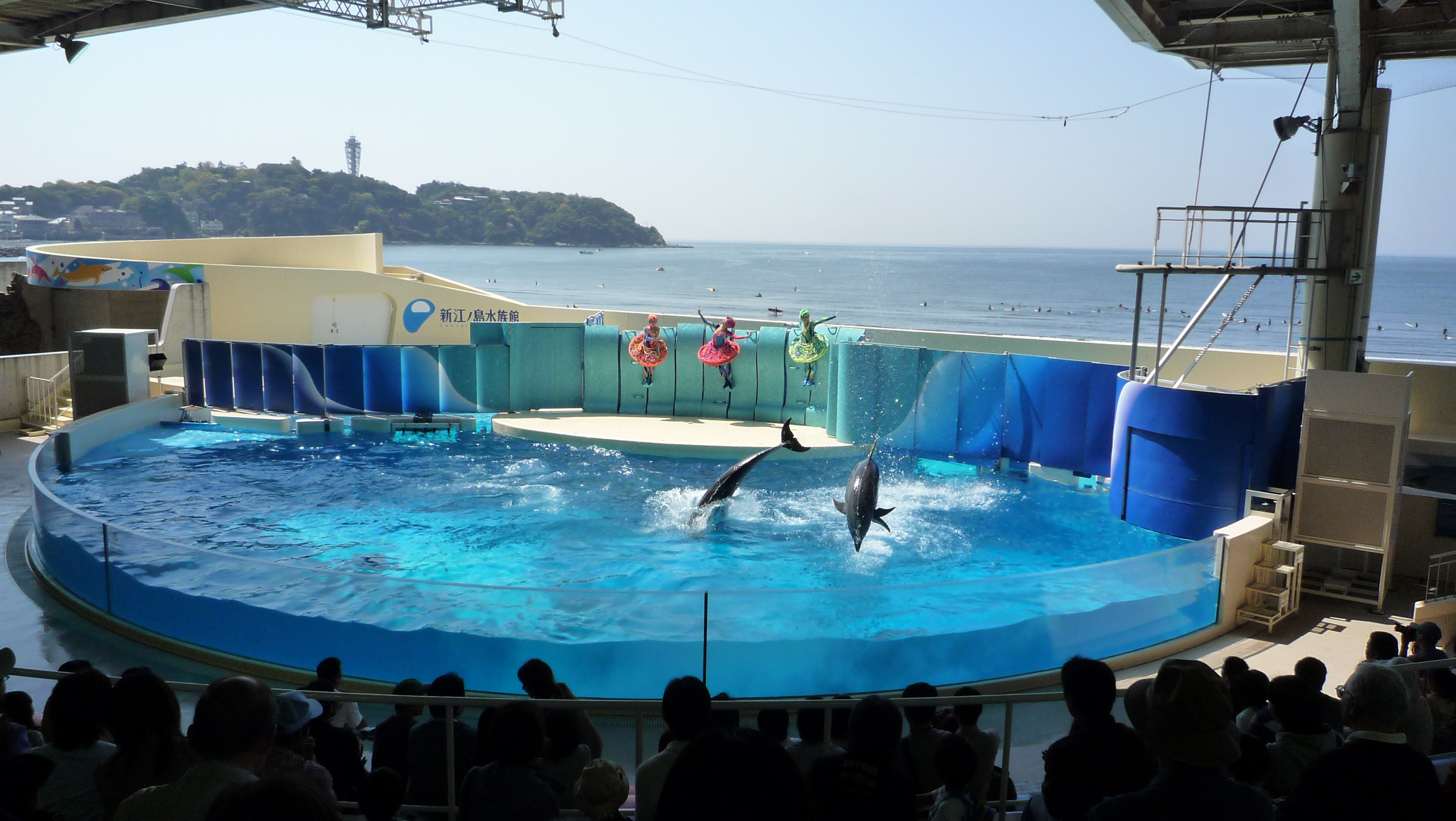

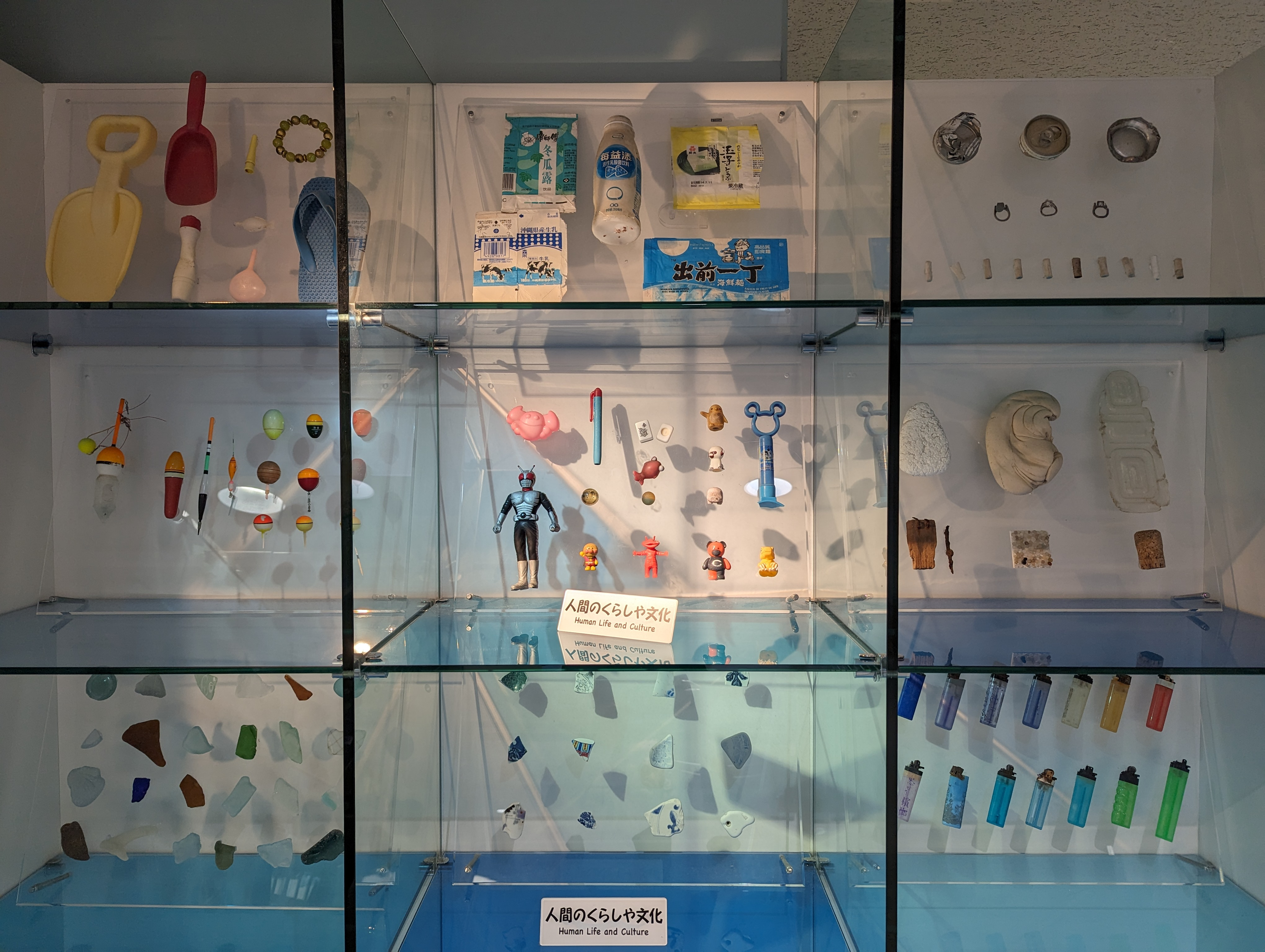

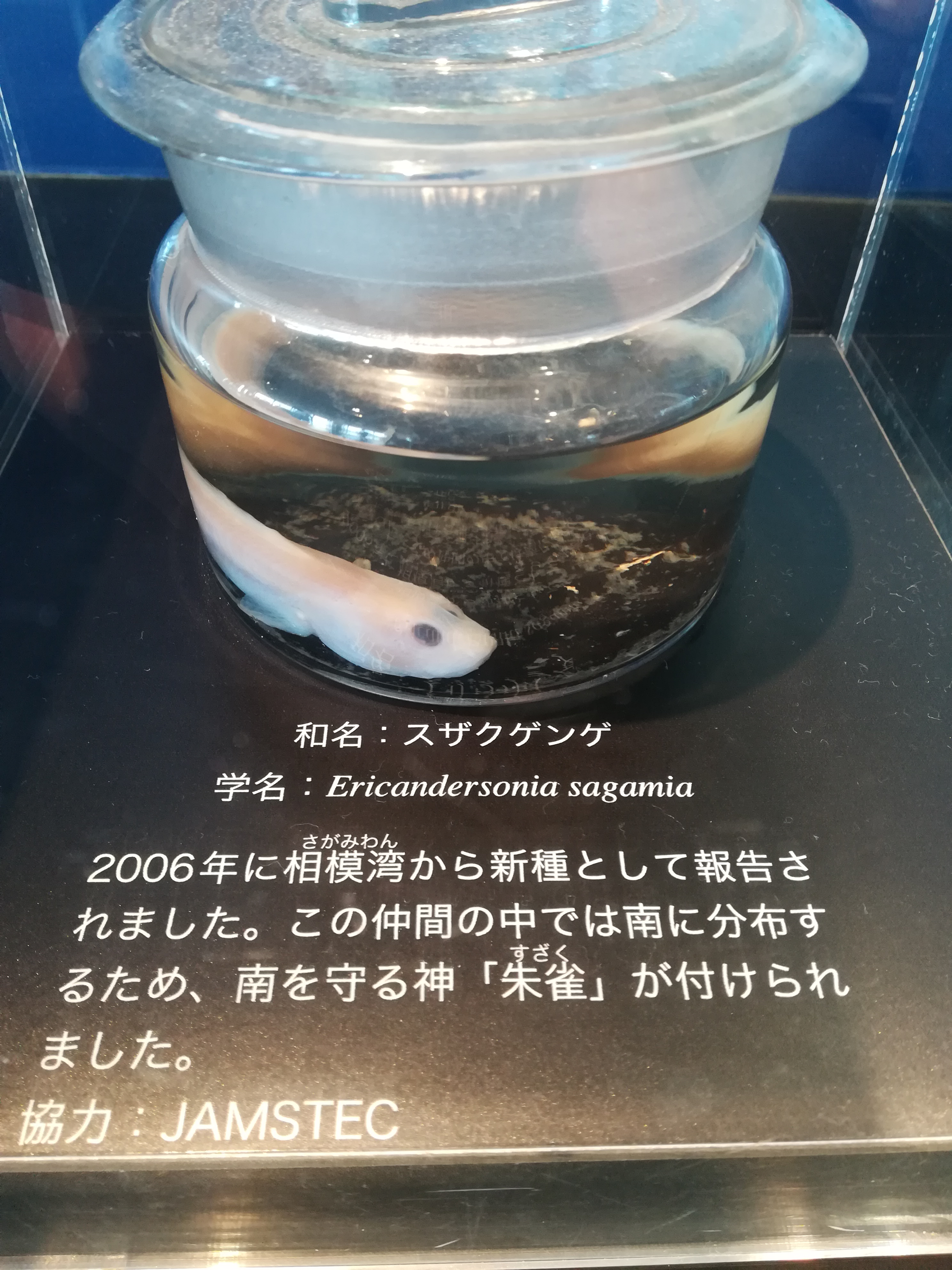
